= Das Supertalent =

German talent show

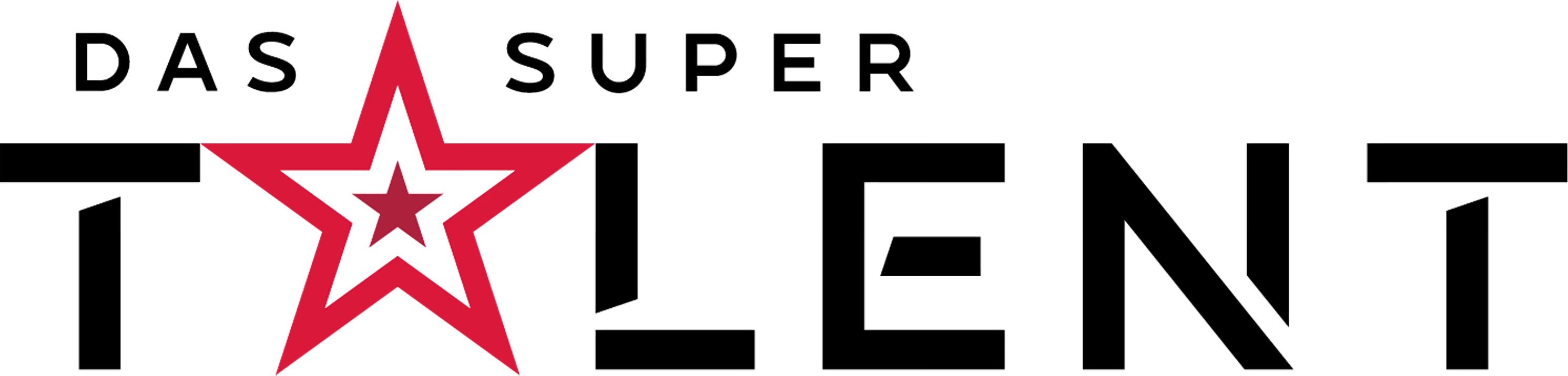
- Genre: Talent show
- Created by: Simon Cowell; Ken Warwick
- Presented by: Marco Schreyl; Daniel Hartwich; Victoria Swarovski; Lola Weippert; Chris Tall; Knossi
- Judges: Dieter Bohlen; Ruth Moschner; André Sarrasani; Sylvie Meis; Bruce Darnell; Motsi Mabuse; Michelle Hunziker; Thomas Gottschalk; Lena Gercke; Guido Maria Kretschmer; Inka Bause; Victoria Swarovski; Nazan Eckes; Sarah Engels; Evelyn Burdecki; Chris Tall; Michael Michalsky; Lukas Podolski; Chantal Janzen; Ehrlich Brothers; Riccardo Simonetti; Andrea Kiewel; Yvonne Catterfeld; Kaya Yanar; Sophia Thomalla; Ekaterina Leonova; Anna Ermakova; Tony Bauer
- Country of origin: Germany
- Original language: German
- No. of seasons: 17
- No. of episodes: 190

Production
- Running time: 60 to 180 minutes
- Production company: GRUNDY Light Entertainment GmbH

Original release
- Network: RTL
- Release: 20 October 2007 – 11 December 2021
- Release: 27 January 2024 – 26 April 2025

Related
- Got Talent

Das Supertalent (Germany's Got Talent, Got Talent Germany) is a German talent show, part of the internationally successful Got Talent franchise, presented by Victoria Swarovski and Knossi. Just like in all other versions of the franchise, auditions take place and the judges review their talent and then later the home audience votes in an election to deem who wins. The prize money is €50,000.

== Seasons ==
=== Season 1 (2007) ===
Season one was presented by Marco Schreyl (also the host of Deutschland sucht den Superstar – the German version of Pop Idol). The first episode premiered on 20 October 2007 on RTL and ended on 3 November 2007. The auditions took place in Cologne, Hamburg, Oldenburg, and Munich and around 5000 people applied for the three-part show. The auditions took place in the first two programs on 20 and 27 October 2007, in the Schiller Theater in Berlin. The judges were Dieter Bohlen (musician and also a judge on Deutschland sucht den Superstar), Ruth Moschner (TV presenter), and André Sarrasani (circus director). The show reached up to 6.72 million in audience figures. On 3 November, 19-year-old opera singer Ricardo Marinello won €100,000 in the final.

- Winner: Ricardo Marinello (Opera singer)
- Runner-up: Tilly Horn (Singer)
- 3rd: Robert Wolf (Beatboxer)
- 4th: Gino Badagliacca (Opera singer)
- 5th: Tobias Krieger (Trumpet player)
- 6th: Philipp Fedan (Dancer)
- 7th: Daniel Carr (Singer)
- 8th: Udo Uhse-Thews (Singer)
- 9th: Die Rabiniak-Schwestern (Singing trio)
- 10th: Renate Recknagel & Roswitha Wahl (Acrobat duo)

=== Season 2 (2008) ===
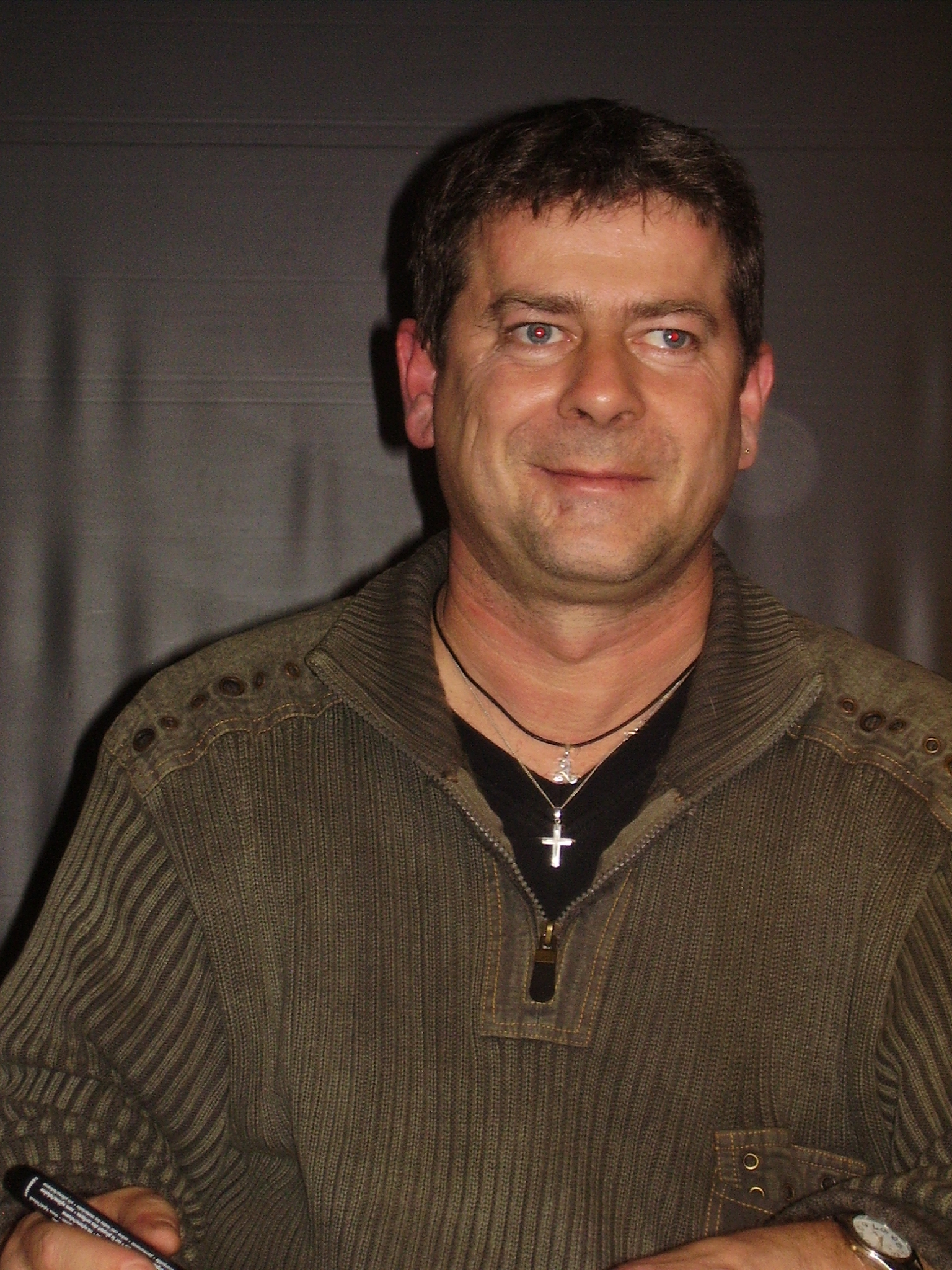
Michael Hirte, winner of season 2

On 18 October 2008, the second season premiered on RTL and ended on 29 November 2008. Due to good ratings, the number of episodes was increased to seven; four audition shows, each an hour long and three live shows, each two hours long. Dieter Bohlen remained as a judge, but the two others were replaced by Bruce Darnell (an American model and choreographer who also judges Germany's Next Topmodel) and Sylvie Meis (a Dutch TV presenter and former wife of footballer Rafael van der Vaart) and the TV presenter Daniel Hartwich joined Marco Schreyl as the new host. The last episodes were on 15 and 22 November; 44-year-old harmonica player Michael Hirte won the second season and €100.000 with 72.62% of all votes.

On 5 December, Michael Hirte released an album called Der Mann mit der Mundharmonika (The Man with the Harmonica) which placed number one on the German charts and did the same somewhat later in Austria and Switzerland.

- Winner: Michael Hirte (Harmonica player)
- Runner-up: Kelvin Kalvus (Contact juggler)
- 3rd: Marcel Pietruch (Hip-Hop dancer)
- 4th: Vanessa Krasniqi (Singer)
- 5th: Yosefin Buohler (Singer)
- 6th: Christoph Haese (Trapeze act)
- 7th: Shinouda Ayad (Derwish dancer)
- 8th: Lucas Wecker (Violinist)
- 9th: Carlos Fassanelli (Singer)
- 10th: Duri Krasniqi (Singer)

=== Season 3 (2009) ===
The third season premiered on 16 October 2009 on RTL and ended on 19 December 2009. The judge line-up remained the same from season two. Due to the high viewing figures in the second season, RTL Television increased the number of the audition episodes from four to seven and the number of the semifinalists from 24 to 30. Yvo Antoni won this season and €100.000 for an act with his dog, which received a controversial response.

- Winner: Yvo Antoni & PrimaDonna (Dog act)
- Runner-up: Vanessa Calcagno (Opera singer)
- 3rd: Petruța Küpper (Panpipe player)
- 4th: Davy Kaufmann (Singer)
- 5th: Richard Istel (Singer)
- 6th: Fabienne Bender (Blind singer and keyboard player)
- 7th: Oliver Roemer (Singer)
- 8th: Karin Andreev (Opera singer)
- 9th: Hannes Schwarz (Fire act)
- 10th: Tamina Geuting (Singer)
- 11th: Carlotta Truman (Singer)
- 12th: Sven Mattiß & Sebastian Wöhrl (Trapeze and taiko duo)

=== Season 4 (2010) ===
Season four began on 16 May 2010 in Frankfurt am Main. The first episode was screened on 24 September 2010 on RTL and the last on 18 December 2010. The judges and the hosts returned for this season. The first episode had some of the best audiences of all the seasons: 7.47 million viewers. The second episode the following day topped that with 7.74 million viewers. The top-40 semifinals began on 27 November. Opera singer Freddy Sahin-Scholl, who has two different voices during the singing, won this season and €100,000.

- Winner: Freddy Sahin-Scholl (Opera singer)
- Runner-up: Michael Holderbusch (Singer)
- 3rd: Tobias Kramer (Deaf dancer)
- 4th: Andrea Renzullo (Singer)
- 5th: Ramona Fottner (Singer)
- 6th: Natalya Netselya (Sand artist)
- 7th: Stevie Starr (Professional regurgitator)
- 8th: Darko Kordic (Singer)
- 9th: Thomas Lohse (Pianist)
- 10th: Bubble Beatz (Percussion on trash act)
- 11th: Daniele Domizio (Michael Jackson impersonator)
- 12th: Ruddy Estevez (Opera singer)

=== Season 5 (2011) ===
The fifth season premiered on 16 September 2011 on RTL and ended on 17 December 2011, while the castings started on 1 May in Hamburg. The judge line-up was changed, as Bruce Darnell decided to leave the show to be replaced by professional dancer Motsi Mabuse. The first episode attracted 7.34 million viewers. On 24 November 2011, the show aired with a "special episode" on Thursday to compete with the new talent show The Voice of Germany from rival networks ProSieben/Sat.1. The episode hit a season low with only 5.83 million viewers and lost against The Voice of Germany in the target group 14–49. Panpipe player Leo Rojas won this season and €100,000.

- Winner: Leo Rojas (Panpipe player)
- Runner-up: Sven Müller (Singer)
- 3rd: Ricky Kam (Pianist)
- 4th: Jörg Perreten (Pianist)
- 5th: Julian Pecher (Singer and guitarist)
- 6th: Mark Ashley (Singer)
- 7th: Miroslav Zilka (Popping act)
- 8th: Desire Capaldo (Opera singer)
- 9th: Dergin Tokmak (Dancer on crutches)
- 10th: Oleksandr Yenivatov (Contortionist)

=== Season 6 (2012) ===
The sixth season premiered on 15 September 2012 on RTL and ended on 15 December 2012. Significant changes were made to the show. Daniel Hartwich hosted the show without Marco Schrey], and Dieter Bohlen was the only judge to remain on the panel. On 22 June 2012, former host of the popular German show Wetten, dass..?, Thomas Gottschalk, was confirmed as a new judge., while Michelle Hunziker, who previously worked with Gottschalk on (Wetten, dass..?) and Bohlen on the local version of singing franchise Pop Idol (Deutschland sucht den Superstar). Auditions only took place in the Tempodrom in Berlin. About 44,000 people auditioned for season six of Das Supertalent. This season, a "golden buzzer" was introduced. If one of the judges pushes the buzzer, the candidate comes to the next round, no matter what the other judges think. At the last day of taping the auditions, performer Rene Richter asked jury member Michelle Hunziker to get involved in the performance, where she was being held by a lead with Rene holding it with his teeth. While holding Hunziker, the lead snapped, which resulted in Hunziker getting a brain concussion and bruises.

This season has featured a number of failed auditioners from international Got Talent shows, such as Dan Sperry and Brad Byers of America's Got Talent, Area 51, and Lucky Franco from Britain's Got Talent. Sperry was one of the few auditioners who automatically made it through to the semifinals due to the golden-buzzer rule.

Former DSDS runner-up Juliette Schoppmann appeared on the show 10 years after she was last seen on RTL. Schoppmann, who originally had success following her second place, had eventually been dropped by her label and failed to make a comeback. Schoppmann felt that this was a way to make it back into music. After successfully auditioning in front of the judges, she had to compete in a sing-off, in which she won a spot in the semifinals. Singer and pianist Jean-Michel Aweh won this season and €100,000.

- Winner: Jean-Michel Aweh (Singer and pianist)
- Runner-up: Christian Bakotessa (Singer)
- 3rd: Dan Sperry (Magician)
- 4th: Jacko (Singing parrot)
- 5th: Laura Pinski (Singer)
- 6th. Juliette Schoppmann (Singer)
- 7th: Emil Kusmirek (Dancer)
- 8th: TaBeA (Gymnastic dance group)
- 9th: Hammou Bensalah (Bubble act)
- 10th: Deidra Jones (Singer)

=== Season 7 (2013) ===
The seventh season premiered on 28 September 2013 on RTL and ended on 14 December 2013. It was the first season with four judges. Model Lena Gercke and fashion designer Guido Maria Kretschmer joined Dieter Bohlen and Bruce Darnell as judges and host Daniel Hartwich returned for this season. Lukas Pratschker and his dog Falco won this season. It was the first time that the winner won a performance in Las Vegas in addition to the €100,000. It was the same for the next three seasons.

- Winner: Lukas Pratschker & Falco (Dog act)
- Runner-up Torsten Ritter (Devil stick juggler)
- 3rd: Viviana Grisafi (Singer)
- 4th: Sophie Schwerthöffer (Opera singer)
- 5th: La Vision (Acrobat duo)
- 6th: Christian Jährig (Schlager singer)
- 7th: Fortunato Lacovara (Opera singer)
- 8th: Heidi Schimczek (Schlager singer)
- 9th: Fantastic 5 (Interaction project dance group)
- 10th: Patrick Feldmann (Breakdancer)

=== Season 8 (2014) ===
The eighth season premiered on 27 September 2014 on RTL and ended on 20 December 2014. All four judges and the host returned for this season. Drag singer Marcel Kaupp won this season. It was the first season, since 2007, without semifinals.

- Winner: Marcel Kaupp (Drag singer)
- Runner-up: Andreas Hruska (Singer)
- 3rd: Die Filieri-Brüder (Singing duo)
- 4th: Tumar KR (Popping group)
- 5th: You and Me (Acrobat duo)
- 6th: Light Balance (Light dance group)
- 7th: Show-Projekt (Gymnastic group)
- 8th: Emin Abdullaev (Contortionist)
- 9th: Patrick Müller-Klug (Singer)
- 10th: Laurent Kramer (Comic singer and guitarist)
- 11th: Stay KingPin (Band)
- 12th: Christian Farla (Magician)

=== Season 9 (2015) ===
After two seasons, only three judges would be used again. The judges were Dieter Bohlen, Inka Bause, and Bruce Darnell. Daniel Hartwich returned as host. The ninth season premiered on 19 September 2015 on RTL and ended on 12 December 2015. Singer Jay Oh, who was usually an audience member during the auditions, won this season.

- Winner: Jay Oh (Singer)
- Runner-up: Erwin Frankello & his sea lions (Sea lion act)
- 3rd: Alessio Greco (Singer and guitarist)
- 4th: Frank Lorenz & Charly (Ventriloquist)
- 5th: Lavinia Meinhardt (Singer)
- 6th: D'Holmikers (Comic gymnastic group)
- 7th: Russischer-Barren-Trio (Bar trio)
- 8th: Zymbalinka (Cymbal trio)
- 9th: Paddy Jones & Nicko Espinosa (Salsa duo)
- 10th: Fabien Kachev (Mime act)
- 11th: Felix Faschingbauer (Yodeler)
- 12th: InFusion Trio (Electronic musician group)

=== Season 10 (2016) ===
The 10th season premiered on 10 September 2016 on RTL and ended on 17 December 2016. TV presenter Inka Bause was replaced by model and singer Victoria Swarovski, and Dieter Bohlen and Bruce Darnell returned as judges. Daniel Hartwich returned as host, too. The golden buzzer returned, as well, in this season. In this and the following two seasons, a golden chair was placed in the audience. This gave an audience member the opportunity to state his or her opinion after each audition, but this person had no voting rights. Singer Angel Flukes won this season.

- Winner: Angel Flukes (Singer)
- Runner-up: Thomas Stieben (Singer)
- 3rd: Gebrüder Scholl (Trampolinist group)
- 4th: Alina Ruppel (Contortionist)
- 5th: Carlos Zaspel (Acrobat)
- 6th: Annette Dytrt & Yannick Bonheur (Roller skating duo)
- 7th: Emil Kusmirek (Dancer)
- 8th: Alex Mihajlovski & Barti (Comic marionette act)
- 9th: Salvatore Scire (Singer)
- 10th: Mannheimer Schule 2.0 (Dance group)
- 11th: Patrick Ulman & Zdenek Kremlacek (Popping duo)
- 12th: Stephanie Höggerl & Dan Miethke (Fire act)

=== Season 11 (2017) ===
The 11th season premiered on 16 September 2017 on RTL and ended on 16 December 2017. TV presenter Nazan Eckes was announced to replace Victoria Swarovski. Dieter Bohlen and Bruce Darnell returned as judges, with Daniel Hartwich as host. Alexa Lauenburger won this season with her dogs. Again €100,000, were the prize to be won, but no longer a performance in Las Vegas was included. In this season, a decision show was aired before the final.

- Winner: Alexa Lauenburger & her dogs (Dog act)
- Runner-up: Allegra Tinnefeld (Singer and violinist)
- 3rd: Baba Yega (Dance group)
- 4th: Noel Lehar (Flautist)
- 5th: Jason Brügger (Aerialist)
- 6th: Stefanie Millinger (Acrobat)
- 7th: Los Manolos Bonn (Musician group)
- 8th: Lucas Fischer (Gymnast and singer)
- 9th: Seicento (Opera singing group)
- 10th: Barbara Mezzi, Irene Greco & Jannis Rasser (Light dance trio)
- 11th: Nigretai (Aerialist duo)
- 12th: Quintino Cruciano (Opera singer)
- 13th: Dúlamán (Irish dance and singing group)
- 14th: Artem Gussev (Contortionist)

=== Season 12 (2018) ===
The 12th season premiered on 15 September 2018 on RTL and ended on 22 December 2018. Dieter Bohlen returned for his 12th series, Bruce Darnell returned for his seventh series, and Sylvie Meis returned after six seasons to replace Nazan Eckes. Daniel Hartwich returned for his 11th series as a host. Regurgitator Stevie Starr won this season and €100,000.

- Winner: Stevie Starr (Professional regurgitator)
- Runner-up: Mo'Voce (Singing trio)
- 3rd: Lorenzo Sposato (Opera singer)
- 4th: Step Out (Acrobat group)
- 5th: Fair Play Crew (Comic dance group)
- 6th: Luciano Velardi, Holger Stemmer & Rosario Ribaudo (Puppet act)
- 7th: Gennady Papizh (Variety act)
- 8th: Olena UUTAi (Jaw harpist)
- 9th: Hannes Schwarz (Fire act)
- 10th: Kevin Elsnig (Opera singer)
- 11th: Andreas Maintz (Breakdancer)
- 12th: JD Anderson (Strongman)

=== Season 13 (2019) ===
The 13th series premiered on 14 September 2019 on RTL and ended on 21 December 2019. Sylvie Meis was replaced by singer Sarah Engels, while Dieter Bohlen returned for his 13th season and Bruce Darnell returned for his eighth series. Daniel Hartwich returned for his 12th series as a host. American dog act Christian Stoinev and Percy won this season and €100,000.

- Winner: Christian Stoinev & Percy (Hand balancer and dog act)
- Runner-up: Georgia Balke (Singer)
- 3rd: Jürgen Kern (Whistler)
- 4th: Dima Shine (Pole dancer)
- 5th: *Ameli Bilyk (Slackline artist)
- 6th: Nina Richel (Singer)
- 7th: De Facto Quartet (Musician group)
- 8th: The Space Cowboy (Danger act)
- 9th: Mirko Casella (Dancer)
- 10th: Angela Kim & Stuart McKenzie (Aerialist and roller skating duo)
- 11th: Yumbo Dump (Comedy duo)
- 12th: Miki Dark (Horror magician)

*Ameli Bilyk was supposed to compete in the final in 2018, but had to be replaced due to an injury.

=== Season 14 (2020) ===
The 14th season premiered on 17 October 2020 on RTL and ended on 19 December 2020. On 18 June 2020, television personality Evelyn Burdecki and comedian Chris Tall were announced as joining Dieter Bohlen and Bruce Darnell as the two new judges. Victoria Swarovski would join Daniel Hartwich as a new host. Singer and guitarist Nick Ferretti won this season and €50,000.

- Winner: Nick Ferretti (Singer and guitarist)
- Runner-up: Messoudi Brothers (Acrobat trio)
- 3rd: Vanessa Calcagno (Opera singer)

The places 4 to 11 have not been revealed, but here are the other contestants who made it to the finals, in order of appearance:

- TSG Harsewinkel (Guard dance group)
- Paul Morocco & "Olé!" (Music and comedy trio)
- Elastic & Francesca (Comedy duo)
- Immortals (Dance group)
- Rafael-Evitan Grombelka (Signing singer)
- Guy First (Hand fart act)
- Magus Utopia (Magic group)
- Rony Navas & Jesse Brandao (Acrobat duo)

=== Season 15 (2021) ===
RTL announced in March 2021 that Dieter Bohlen and Bruce Darnell would no longer be judges on the show. Three months after that, RTL announced that hosts Daniel Hartwich and Victoria Swarovski would no longer be part of the show, as well. Later, RTL confirmed that fashion designer Michael Michalsky, football player Lukas Podolski, Dutch TV presenter Chantal Janzen, and the magician duo Ehrlich Brothers would be the new judges. Due to various absences of the main judges, changing guest judges were used throughout the season. While Evelyn Burdecki did not return to the show, Chris Tall switched sides. He co-hosted the season with Lola Weippert. The season aired on RTL from 2 October 2021 to 11 December 2021. For the first time since 2013, two semifinals were held again. Opera singer Elena Turcan won this season and €50,000.

- Winner: Elena Turcan (Opera singer)
- Runner-up: Vitória Bueno (Ballet dancer)
- 3rd: Drew Colby (Hand shadow player)
- 4th: Inclusion Dance Show (Light dance group)
- 5th: Chris Cross (Dancer)
- 6th: Helena Berlinghof (Pianist)
- 7th: Keiichi Iwasaki (Comedy act)
- 8th: Light Balance Kids (Light dance group)
- 9th: Karabo Morake (Dancer)
- 10th: Na' Mouléma (Gospel choir)

=== Season 16 (2024) ===
After a break, the 16th season premiered on 27 January 2024 on RTL and ended on 17 February 2024. On 18 August 2023, Dieter Bohlen and Bruce Darnell were announced as returning to the jury. Professional dancer Ekaterina Leonova and model Anna Ermakova would join them as the two new judges. On 7 December 2023, Victoria Swarovski was to be hosting the show for the second time and Knossi would be taking part for the first time. Opera singer Alexander Doghmani won this season and €50,000.

- Winner: Alexander Doghmani (Opera singer)
- Runner-up: Black Widow (Dance group)
- 3rd: Ramadhani Brothers (Acrobat duo)

The places 4 to 10 have not been revealed, but here are the other contestants who made it to the finals, in order of appearance:

- The Blackouts (Light dance group)
- Maximilian von Lütgendorff (Opera singer)
- Bomba Trio (Comedy trio)
- Mystery (Dance group)
- Denys Zhygaltsov (Acrobat)
- Daniele Tommasi & Naimana Casanova (Ventriloquists)
- Dalton Sessumes (Light show)

=== Season 17 (2025) ===
The 17th season premiered on 5 April 2025 on RTL and ended on 26 April 2025. The judges Dieter Bohlen, Bruce Darnell and Ekaterina Leonova were joined by comedian Tony Bauer. Victoria Swarovski and Knossi returned as hosts. Singer Jayden Swingewood won this season and €50,000.

- Winner: Jayden Swingewood (Singer)
- Runner-up: Fab Fox (Magician)
- 3rd: Ashlee Rose Montague (Ballet dancer)

The places 4 to 10 have not been revealed, but here are the other contestants who made it to the finals, in order of appearance:

- Viggo Venn (Comedian)
- Lucky Kids (Singing group)
- Alexander Leshchenko (Light dance show)
- Anja Luna (Acrobat and harp player)
- Avio Focolari (Whistler)
- Max Bijak (Scooter show)
- Solange Kardinaly (Quick change act)

== Season summary ==
Season	Start	End	No. of episodes	Winner	Winner's act
1	20 October 2007	3 November 2007	3	Ricardo Marinello	Opera singer
2	18 October 2008	29 November 2008	7	Michael Hirte	Harmonica player
3	16 October 2009	19 December 2009	11	Yvo Antoni & PrimaDonna	Dog act
4	24 September 2010	18 December 2010	15	Freddy Sahin-Scholl	Opera singer
5	16 September 2011	17 December 2011	16	Leo Rojas	Panpipe player
6	15 September 2012	15 December 2012	14	Jean-Michel Aweh	Singer and pianist
7	28 September 2013	14 December 2013	12	Lukas Pratschker & Falco	Dog act
8	27 September 2014	20 December 2014	13	Marcel Kaupp	Drag singer
9	19 September 2015	12 December 2015	14	Jay Oh	Singer
10	10 September 2016	17 December 2016	14	Angel Flukes	Singer
11	16 September 2017	16 December 2017	14	Alexa Lauenburger & her dogs	Dog act
12	15 September 2018	22 December 2018	14	Stevie Starr	Professional regurgitator
13	14 September 2019	21 December 2019	14	Christian Stoinev & Percy	Hand balancer and dog act
14	17 October 2020	19 December 2020	11	Nick Ferretti	Singer and guitarist
15	2 October 2021	11 December 2021	10	Elena Turcan	Opera singer
16	27 January 2024	17 February 2024	4	Alexander Doghmani	Opera singer
17	5 April 2025	26 April 2025	4	Jayden Swingewood	Singer

== Judges and hosts ==
Seasons	Hosts		Judges			
1	Marco Schreyl		Dieter Bohlen	Ruth Moschner	André Sarrasani	
2	Marco Schreyl	Daniel Hartwich	Dieter Bohlen	Sylvie Meis	Bruce Darnell	
3	Marco Schreyl	Daniel Hartwich	Dieter Bohlen	Sylvie Meis	Bruce Darnell	
4	Marco Schreyl	Daniel Hartwich	Dieter Bohlen	Sylvie Meis	Bruce Darnell	
5	Marco Schreyl	Daniel Hartwich	Sylvie Meis	Dieter Bohlen	Motsi Mabuse	
6	Daniel Hartwich		Dieter Bohlen	Michelle Hunziker	Thomas Gottschalk	
7	Daniel Hartwich		Dieter Bohlen	Lena Gercke	Guido Maria Kretschmer	Bruce Darnell
8	Daniel Hartwich		Dieter Bohlen	Lena Gercke	Guido Maria Kretschmer	Bruce Darnell
9	Daniel Hartwich		Dieter Bohlen	Inka Bause	Bruce Darnell	
10	Daniel Hartwich		Dieter Bohlen	Victoria Swarovski	Bruce Darnell	
11	Daniel Hartwich		Dieter Bohlen	Nazan Eckes	Bruce Darnell	
12	Daniel Hartwich		Dieter Bohlen	Sylvie Meis	Bruce Darnell	
13	Daniel Hartwich		Dieter Bohlen	Sarah Engels	Bruce Darnell	
14	Victoria Swarovski	Daniel Hartwich	Dieter Bohlen	Evelyn Burdecki	Chris Tall	Bruce Darnell
15	Lola Weippert	Chris Tall	Michael Michalsky	Lukas Podolski^{1}	Chantal Janzen^{2}	Ehrlich Brothers^{3}
16	Victoria Swarovski	Knossi	Dieter Bohlen	Ekaterina Leonova	Anna Ermakova	Bruce Darnell
17	Victoria Swarovski	Knossi	Dieter Bohlen	Ekaterina Leonova	Tony Bauer	Bruce Darnell

Annotations

- ^{1}Lukas Podolski was replaced by Motsi Mabuse ("Audition 1"; "Audition 2"), Andrea Kiewel ("Audition 3"), Yvonne Catterfeld ("Audition 4"), Kaya Yanar ("Audition 5"), and Sophia Thomalla ("Audition 7") during season 15.
- ^{2}Riccardo Simonetti stepped in for Chantal Janzen in the first "Audition" of season 15.
- ^{3}Riccardo Simonetti ("Audition 6") and Thomas Gottschalk ("Semi-Final 2") replaced the Ehrlich Brothers during season 15.

== Reception ==
Barbara Grofe of RP Online wrote in an early review: "Talents are little to see, but an awful lot of people with ego problems". In another review, it was criticized that also children at a very young age can present their talents. The youth protection also takes a close eye on the show for years now. Next to that, it has been highly criticized in recent seasons that candidates with no real talent are presented to the audience after a pre-casting to humiliate these people and push the ratings. Christian Richter writes about the show that the "performances are artificially drawn in the length" and the candidates "tell their personal tragic story with overly dramatic music", even repeating the crucial scenes again in slow motion. Richter goes on saying that "RTL characterizes the term 'Emotainments'". It was also published by the Bild as "super cheating" that RTL paid some of their talents money for their participation in the show. In spite of the critics, the show is very popular among viewers. In 2010, Das Supertalent also won the Golden Camera award as Best Entertainment Show.

== See also ==
- Got Talent
- Britain's Got Talent
- America's Got Talent
- Miss Supertalent
