= Das Supertalent season 7 =

Das Supertalent
- Season 7
- Hosted by: Daniel Hartwich
- Judges: Dieter Bohlen; Lena Gercke; Guido Maria Kretschmer; Bruce Darnell
- Winner: Lukas & Falco
- Runner-up: Torsten Ritter

Release
- Original network: RTL
- Original release: 28 September – 14 December 2013

Das Supertalent Season 7 was the seventh season of Germany's Got Talent franchise. Season 7 began on 28 September 2013.

The seventh season premiered in September 2013, and concluded in December 2013. The host remained as Daniel Hartwich, while Dieter Bohlen was the only returning judge from season six. Lena Gercke, Guido Maria Kretschmer and Bruce Darnell are new members in the Jury.

Lukas and his dog Falco won the show and €100,000.

== Auditions ==
=== Episode 1: September 28, 2013 ===
Order	Contestant	Talent	Jurys' Choices			
Order	Contestant	Talent	Bruce Darnell	Guido Maria Kretschmer	Lena Gercke	Dieter Bohlen
1	Adrian Mathias	Diabolo				
2	Joel Lariga Amper (Big Mouth)	Singing				
3	Viviana Grisafi	Singing				
4	Bülent Ayaz	Magic				
5	Vanessa Eich	Magic				
6	Rainer Felsen	Clarinet				
7	Christian Tiemann	Entertaining				
8	"Jecsmen"	Acrobatics				
9	Fortunato Lacovara	Singing				
10	Kai and Gerhard	Motocross				

=== Episode 2: October 4, 2013 ===
Order	Contestant	Talent	Jurys' Choices			
Order	Contestant	Talent	Bruce Darnell	Guido Maria Kretschmer	Lena Gercke	Dieter Bohlen
1	"Fantastic 5"	Illusion dance				
2	Kevin James	Magic				
3	Eiko and Denny	Singing				
4	Markus Zenz	Singing				
5	Jorge Perez	Percussion				
6	Torsten Ritter	Juggling				
7	"Mejeh Black"	Hip-hop dance				
8	"Bling Bling Selim"	Rapping				
9	Josef Demmler	Parachuting				

=== Episode 3: October 12, 2013 ===
Order	Contestant	Talent	Jurys' Choices			
Order	Contestant	Talent	Bruce Darnell	Guido Maria Kretschmer	Lena Gercke	Dieter Bohlen
1	"Robot Boys"	Popping				
2	Sophie Schwerthöffer	Singing				
3	Ivo Hannemann	Singing				
4	Jordi Bertran	Puppetry				
5	Temper & Qurious (Golden Retrievers)	Piano				
6	Rene Adler	Rapping				
7	"Lazarus"	Contortion				
8	Mario Beutner	Singing				
9	"Crazy Ladies"	Dancing				
10	Leandro Granato	Painting				
11	Lili Schreiber	Singing				
12	Carsten, Marie & Josie	Pyrotechnics				

=== Episode 4: October 19, 2013 ===
Order	Contestant	Talent	Jurys' Choices			
Order	Contestant	Talent	Bruce Darnell	Guido Maria Kretschmer	Lena Gercke	Dieter Bohlen
1	"Laserfighters"	Lazer Show				
2	Christian Jährig	Singing				
3	James More	Magic				
4	Mike Kazmaier	Singing				
5	Margarete Kilian	Singing				
6	"Red Ants"	Acrobatics				
7	Maria Fischer	Singing				
8	Mathieu Bolillo	Acrobatics				
9	"Todes-Springer"	Trampoline				
10	Karsten Vollmer	Singing				
11	Scott & Muriel	Comedy & Magic				

=== Episode 5: October 26, 2013 ===
Order	Contestant	Talent	Jurys' Choices			
Order	Contestant	Talent	Bruce Darnell	Guido Maria Kretschmer	Lena Gercke	Dieter Bohlen
1	Patrick Feldmann	Dancing				
2	Stevie Pink	Magic				
3	Soraya Darouiche	Singing				
4	Diva	Singing Dog				
5	"Feet Back"	Dancing				
6	Iris	Singing				
7	Brani	Dancing				
8	Jörg Knör	Recorder				
9	Frank Simon	Equilibristics				
10	Didi	Bicycle				
11	Kimberley	Singing				
12	Andre	Singing				

=== Episode 6: November 2, 2013 ===
Order	Contestant	Talent	Jurys' Choices			
Order	Contestant	Talent	Bruce Darnell	Guido Maria Kretschmer	Lena Gercke	Dieter Bohlen
1	Jan & Ivo	Yo-yo				
2	Djamal	Dancing				
3	Barbara	Singing				
4	"Sugar Dandies"	Dancing				
5	Lukas & Falco	Dog Act				
6	David Goodman	Singing				
7	"Positive People"	Fatsuit Show				
8	Evgeny	Hoop rolling				
9	"Vopiano"	Singing				
10	Thomas Krüger	Piano				

=== Episode 7: November 9, 2013 ===
Order	Contestant	Talent	Jurys' Choices			
Order	Contestant	Talent	Bruce Darnell	Guido Maria Kretschmer	Lena Gercke	Dieter Bohlen
1	Nele	Twirling				
2	Dino	Singing				
3	Danny	Yoga				
4	"Pattaya-Heinz"	Singing				
5	Sheila	Pole dance				
6	Diana-Maria	Singing				
7	Andreas	Post-it Act				
8	Laura & Pavel	Dancing				
9	Johann Vlemmix	Fluit				
10	Tatjana	Singing				
11	Peter	Juggling				
12	Tatjana	Singing				
13	Charlie Placais	Acrobatics				
14	Dr. Haze	Magic				
15	Heidi Schimiczek	Singing				

=== Episode 8: November 16, 2013 ===
Order	Contestant	Talent	Jurys' Choices			
Order	Contestant	Talent	Bruce Darnell	Guido Maria Kretschmer	Lena Gercke	Dieter Bohlen
1	"Fothamockaz"	Hip-Hop				
2	"Showsternchen"	Acrobatics				
3	Jennifer	Singing				
4	Florian Lica	Dancing				
5	Ibrahim	Singing				
6	Tobi Haller	Dancing				
7	"Stickstoff"	Lazer Show				
8	"Beardland"	Singing				
9	Igor	Comedy				
10	Werner Stenger	Singing				
11	Karolina	Singing				

=== Episode 9: November 23, 2013 ===
Order	Contestant	Talent	Jurys' Choices			
Order	Contestant	Talent	Bruce Darnell	Guido Maria Kretschmer	Lena Gercke	Dieter Bohlen
1	Fabian	Dancing				
2	Destiny and Justino	Dancing				
3	Ivana	Singing				
4	Karl Fischer	Eagle Show				
5	Gym United	Dancing				
6	Xander Venema	Singing				
7	DJ Salvatore	Disc jockey Act				
8	André	Singing				
9	Cindy	Singing				
10	Alfredo Portillo	Harp				

== Semi-finals ==
Semi-final 1 (30 November 2013)
Contestant	Act	Percentage of Calls	Result
Torsten Ritter	Juggling	22.61%	Save
Sophie Schwerthöffer	Singing	13.61%	Save
Christian Jährig	Singing	11.71%	Save
"La Vision"	Acrobatics	10.71%	Save
"Stickstoff"	Lazer Show	10.37%	Eliminated
Viviana Grisafi	Singing	9.87%	Jury's Decision
Vanessa Eich	Magic	8.04%	Eliminated
"Mejeh Black"	Dancing	6.44%	Eliminated
Kai & Gerhard	Motorcross	4.08%	Eliminated
Thomas Krüger	Piano	2.56%	Eliminated

=== Semi-final 2 ===
Semi-final 2 (7 December 2013)
Contestant	Act	Percentage of Calls	Result
Lukas & Falco	Dog Act	28.03%	Save
Fortunato Lacovara	Singing	21.53%	Save
Heidi Schimiczek	Singing	12.01%	Save
Patrick Feldmann	Dancing	8.93%	Save
Maria Fischer	Singing	8.29%	Eliminated
Eiko & Denny	Singing	6.72%	Eliminated
"Fantastic 5"	Dancing	5.59%	Jury's Decision
Jordi Bertran	Puppetry	4.44%	Eliminated
Adrian Mathias	Diabolo	2.43%	Eliminated
Kevin James	Magic	2.03%	Eliminated

== Final ==
Final (14 December 2013)
Contestant	Act	Percentage of Calls	Result
Lukas & Falco	Dog Act	25.48%	1st
Torsten Ritter	Juggling	16.08%	2nd
Viviana Grisafi	Singing	11.73%	3rd
Sophie Schwerthöffer	Singing	11.13%	4th
"La Vision"	Acrobatics	10.84%	5th
Christian Jährig	Singing	6.35%	6th
Fortunato Lacovara	Singing	5.54%	7th
Heidi Schimiczek	Singing	5.19%	8th
"Fantastic 5"	Dancing	3.94%	9th
Patrick Feldmann	Dancing	3.72%	10th
