= Pricasso =

Australian painter

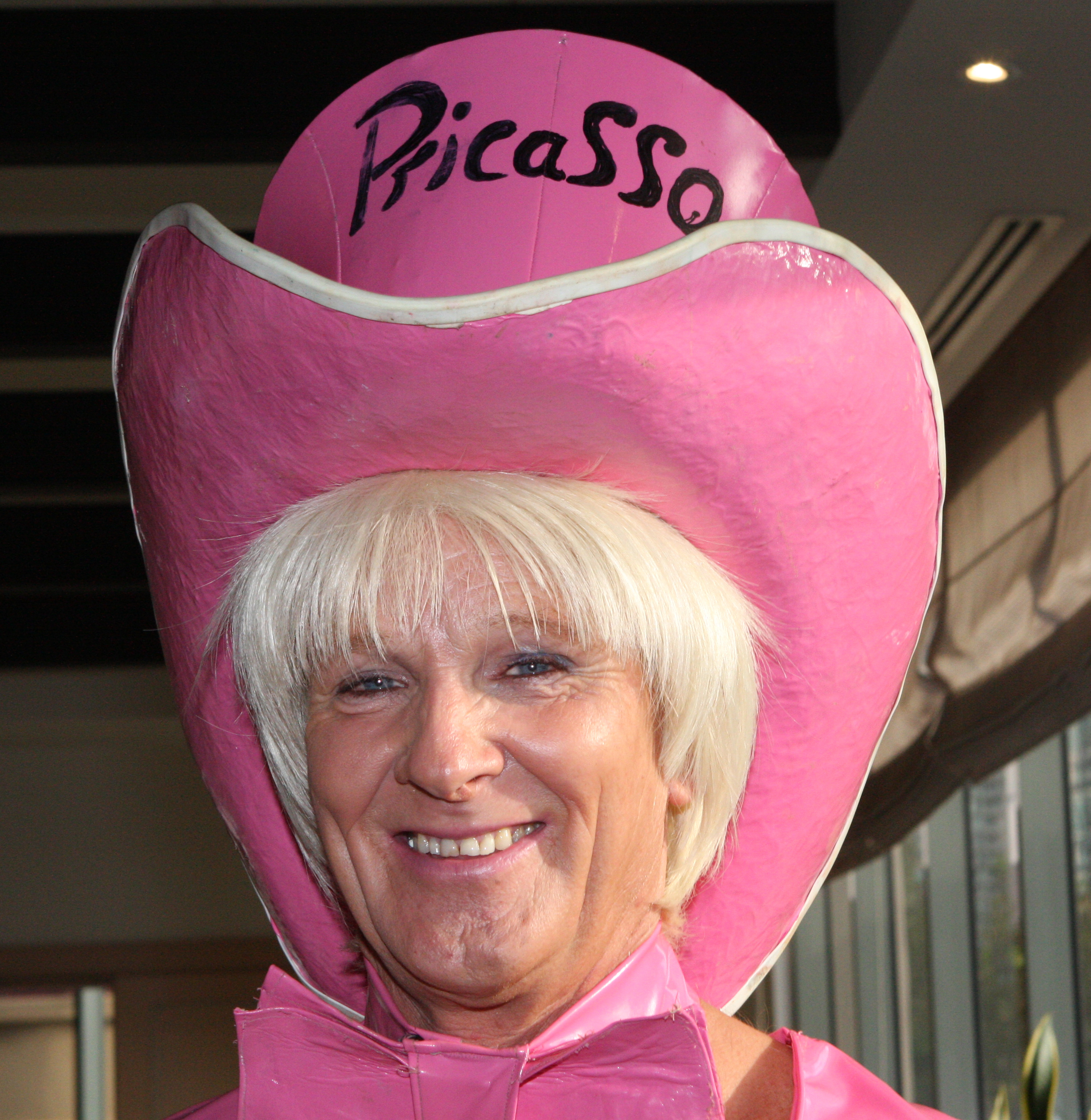
- Patch as Pricasso at a press conference for Sexpo in Sydney, March 2012
- Born: Timothy James Francis Patch; 1949 or 1950 (age 76–77); United Kingdom
- Known for: Painting
- Website: pricasso.com

Timothy James Francis Patch (born 1949 or 1950), commonly known by his professional stage name Pricasso, is an Australian artist who is known for using his genitals to paint portraits, landscapes and female nudes.

== Background ==
Patch was born in the United Kingdom. He attended Oakwood Preparatory School in Chichester and then went on to attend Bembridge School on the Isle of Wight. After Bembridge, Patch went on to study at the Portsmouth College of Art and the Royal West of England Academy. Unable to earn a degree in fine arts he attended furniture design courses and became a builder.

In 1977, he migrated from the United Kingdom to Australia; further, from 1978 to 1982 he exhibited woodcarvings and other artworks in art galleries. In 1984, Patch established Hellfire Pottery with his sister, which produced various pottery and ceramic works. In 2002, Patch began work on building a Gaudí-style house and art gallery, and during this same period he began working as a portrait and caricature artist in markets in Queensland.

Patch states that he conceived of the idea of painting with his penis in 2005. Inspired after watching Puppetry of the Penis, he drew a smiley face in the back of a urinal with his penis and then decided to attempt it at home using paint. After telling a friend of his work, she had him paint at a 2005 New Year's Eve party on a dare. In 2006, Patch chose the name of "Pricasso" – a portmanteau of "prick" (a slang term for penis) and "Picasso".

== Works and appearances ==
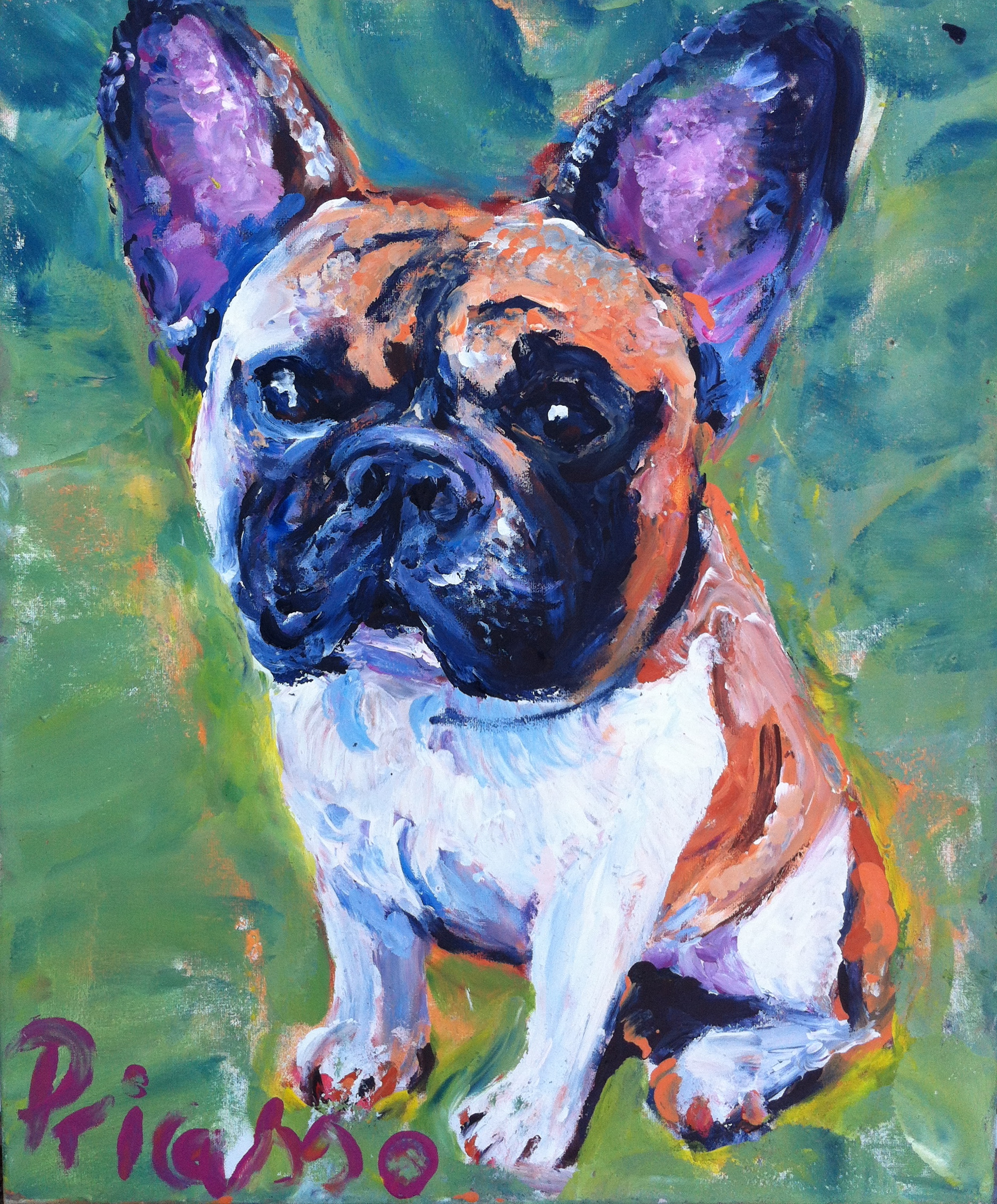
Painting of a dog by Pricasso

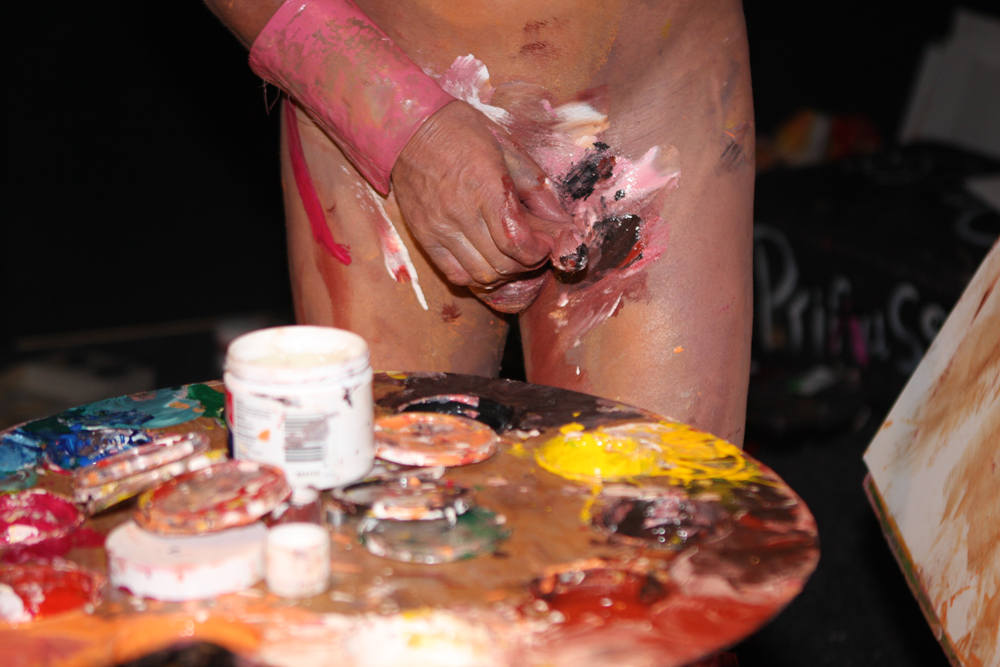
Pricasso applies paint to his penis as part of the painting process.

In an interview with Voima, Pricasso said that portrait work is the most challenging type of painting, so he set himself a goal of painting an accurate-looking portrait within 20 minutes. Due to normal paint containing lime, which erodes the skin, Pricasso makes his own water-based paints. Before he begins painting, he also covers his penis and buttocks in Vaseline in order to work for several hours without causing irritation to his skin.

While art galleries showed little interest in his paintings, Pricasso became a regular attraction at Sexpo exhibitions around the world, where he paints portraits for attendees.

Pricasso's appearance at the 2010 Expo Sexo y Entretenimiento México was cancelled after censors from the Mexico City authorities attended the exposition to verify the shows. He made his North American debut at the 2011 Miami Xposed Expo, and signed an agreement to appear exclusively at future Xposed Expo events.

In 2008, Pricasso entered a nude self-portrait into the Archibald Prize. His submission came after an unsuccessful entry in the 2007 competition using a portrait of plastic surgeon Joseph Georghy.

Pricasso told Fala Fil that, while celebrities tend to be wary of having him paint their portrait, he has painted at private parties for famous individuals after agreeing to not publicise the event. Charlie Murphy was one celebrity who Pricasso noted as approving. Amongst the celebrities he said he painted portraits of are Hugh Hefner, John Howard, Kim Beazley, George W. Bush, Robert Mugabe, Barack Obama, Jacob Zuma, Queen Elizabeth II, Kevin Rudd, Tony Blair, and Luiz Inácio Lula da Silva.

In the latter half of 2010, Pricasso appeared on the 4th season of German TV talent show Das Supertalent. After painting a female portrait on the stage, Sylvie van der Vaart voted down the performance, but he progressed to the next round due to the support of the two male judges on the panel – Dieter Bohlen and Bruce Darnell. In November 2011, Pricasso appeared on Tosh.0, where Daniel Tosh interviewed and commissioned a picture of himself painted by the artist.

== Response to technique ==
Nicholas Chare, in an article titled "Sexing the Canvas", has linked Pricasso's work with statements by classic modern painters who referred to the activity of painting as a "seminal" or "spermatic" activity with sexual connotations.

In the lead-up to the 2008 Sexpo in Cape Town, Pricasso published a video online showing him creating a painting of then-Mayor of Cape Town Helen Zille. Although he stated the painting was not meant to insult or embarrass Zille, The Times reported that two art galleries in Johannesburg declined to associate themselves with Pricasso's artwork. The curator of Moja Modern gallery suggested that the ridicule of his work could abate in fifty years time and his painting seen as having broken boundaries in art. Julia Charlton, the senior curator of the Wits Gallery, said that it is not a question of whether it is art, but whether it is "good art". Charlton and Pieter van Heerden, the director of the Pretoria Art Institute, stated that how he painted did not determine the artistic nature of his work, with Charlton adding that "art is not only meant to be pleasant, but provocative, and it should get people talking." Van Heerden further stated his work is not offensive and that works only become art when they are great. On hearing of Pricasso's painting, Zille stated "This is a free country. A free society throws up these kinds of people, who exercise their freedom in unusual ways. And if this is how he wants to do it, I must accept his constitutional right to do so." Zille further commented that Pricasso "achieved a good likeness and I can't imagine how he painted it without brushes or conventional equipment."

In November 2011, Pricasso participated in the Gold Coast Sculptors' Society Exotic Erotic show. The controversial nature of his technique caused several members of the Society to object to his participation, with one member resigning in protest. Pricasso responded to criticism by saying, "I think I'm just as good as anyone with a brush and I'm probably a lot quicker ... They can complain if they want to but other people love it."

== See also ==
- Milo Moiré, artist whose work titled plop egg features her dropping eggs filled with paint from her vagina to create abstract paintings.
