= Das Supertalent season 5 =

Das Supertalent
- Season 5
- Hosted by: Marco Schreyl; Daniel Hartwich
- Judges: Sylvie van der Vaart; Dieter Bohlen; Motsi Mabuse
- Winner: Leo Rojas
- Runner-up: Sven Müller

Release
- Original network: RTL
- Original release: 16 September – 17 December 2011

Season chronology
- ← Previous; Season 4

The broadcast of the fifth season began on 16 September 2011. The judges were Dieter Bohlen, Sylvie van der Vaart and Motsi Mabuse. It was hosted by Daniel Hartwich and Marco Schreyl. Like the years before, television presenter Nina Moghaddam shows what goes behind the scenes of the show.

The panpipe-player, Leo Rojas, won the competition and €100 000.

== Casting ==
The casting for this season began on 1 May 2011 in Hamburg. Also, Dresden, Essen, Mainz, Wiesbaden, Munich, Berlin, Erfurt, Karlsruhe, Vienna and Cologne.

== Semi-Finals ==
Participant	Genre	Act	Semi-Final	Result
Cihan Karacha	Music	Singing	1	Eliminated
Constantin Bellu	Acrobatics	Comedy acrobatics	1	Eliminated
Daniel Wurtzel	Variety	Air installations	1	Eliminated
Dergin Tokmak	Dance	Acrobatic dance on crutches	1	Finalist
Desire Capaldo	Music	Opera singing	1	Finalist
Die Mobilés	Variety	Shadow theatre	1	Eliminated
Garry Turner	Variety	Stretchable skin	1	Eliminated
Jörg Perreten	Music	Piano	2	Finalist
Julian Pecher	Music	Singing	1	Finalist
Kai Eikermann	Dance	Comedy popping	1	Eliminated
Leonie Neudert	Music	Opera singing	2	Eliminated
Leo Rojas	Music	Panpipe	2	Winner
Lukas Mattioli	Music	Singing	2	Eliminated
Mark Ashley	Music	Singing	2	Finalist
Marlene Wenzig	Music	Singing	2	Eliminated
Miroslav Žilka	Dance	Popping	2	Finalist
Oleksandr Yenivatov	Variety	Contortion	2	Finalist
Piero Esteriore	Music	Classic singing	2	Eliminated
Ricky Kam	Music	Piano	1	Third place
Sebastian Stamm	Acrobatics	Acrobatics on the Chinese mast	2	Eliminated
Sos and Victoria Petrosyan	Variety	Quick-change	2	Eliminated
Stevie Starr	Variety	Regurgitation	2	Eliminated
Sven Müller	Music	Singing	1	Runner-up
True Fame	Dance	Various dance styles	1	Eliminated

=== Semi-Finals summary ===
Buzzed Out

==== Semi-Final 1 (December 3) ====
Contestant	Order	Mabuse	Bohlen	van der Vaart	Result
Constantin Bellu	1				Eliminated
Ricky Kam	2				Advanced
True Fame	3				Eliminated
Julian Pecher	4				Advanced
Die Mobilés	5				Eliminated
Cihan Karaca	6				Eliminated
Daniel Wurtzel	7				Eliminated
Kai Eikermann	8				Eliminated
Dergin Tokmak	9				Advanced (chosen by the judges)
Desire Capaldo	10				Advanced
Garry Turner	11				Eliminated
Sven Müller	12				Advanced

==== Semi-Final 2 (December 10) ====
Contestant	Order	Mabuse	Bohlen	van der Vaart	Result
Mark Ashley	1				Advanced
Sebastian Stamm	2				Eliminated
Marlene Wenzig	3				Eliminated
Lukas Mattioli	4				Eliminated
Sos and Victoria Petrosyan	5				Eliminated
Jörg Perreten	6				Advanced
Piero Esteriore	7				Eliminated
Oleksandr Yenivatov	8				Advanced (chosen by the judges)
Leo Rojas	9				Advanced
Leonie Neubert	10				Eliminated
Miroslav Žilka	11				Advanced
Stevie Starr	12				Eliminated

== Final ==
=== Final (December 17) ===
Contestant	Order	Finished
Mark Ashley	1	6th (6.60%)
Oleksandr Yenivatov	2	10th (1.70%)
Ricky Kam	3	Third place (13.23%)
Dergin Tokmak	4	9th (2.85%)
Julian Pecher	5	5th (7.17%)
Leo Rojas	6	Winner (31.93%)
Desire Capaldo	7	8th (5.92%)
Miroslav Žilka	8	7th (6.24%)
Jörg Perreten	9	4th (10.68%)
Sven Müller	10	Runner-up (13.68%)
