= Das Supertalent season 2 =

Das Supertalent
- Season 2
- Hosted by: Marco Schreyl; Daniel Hartwich
- Judges: Dieter Bohlen; Sylvie van der Vaart; Bruce Darnell
- Winner: Michael Hirte
- Runner-up: Kelvin Kalvus

Release
- Original network: RTL
- Original release: 18 October – 22 November 2008

Season chronology
- ← Previous; Season 1 Next → Season 3

Das Supertalent (season 2) is the second season of Germany's Got Talent franchise. Season 2 began on 18 October 2008. Owing to good ratings in season 1, the number of episodes was increased to seven; four audition shows, each one hour long and three live shows, each two hours long. The judges were Dieter Bohlen, Bruce Darnell and Sylvie van der Vaart. The last episodes were on 15 and 22 November. 44-year-old harmonica player Michael Hirte won the second season with 72.62 percent of the vote and won the 100,000 euros with it. On 5 December he released an album called Der Mann mit der Mundharmonika (The Man with the Harmonica) which placed No. 1 on the German Charts and did the same little later in Austria and Switzerland.

== Semi-finals ==
=== Semi-finals 1 ===
Semi-final 1 (15 November 2008)
Contestant(s)	Act	Result
Kelvin Kalvus (40)	Contact juggling	Majority votes
Lucas Wecker (12)	fiddler	Majority votes
Vanessa Krasniqi (14)	Singing	Majority votes
Michael Hirte (44)	Harmonica	Majority votes
Duri Krasniqi (13)	Singing	Judges' choice
Felice Aguilar (17) and Chris Myland (18)	Dance	Eliminated
Carolina (17) and Amanda Lopez-Moreno (11)	Singing	Eliminated
Chris Böhm (25)	BMX	Eliminated
Giuseppe Ruisi (30)	Singing (Michael-Jackson-Imitation)	Eliminated
Hans Will (73) and Rüdiger Sommer (62)	Gymnastics	Eliminated
Terror Bunch	Breakdance	Eliminated
Zlata Günthel (24)	Contortion	Eliminated

=== Semi-final 2 ===
Semi-final 2 (22 November 2008)
Contestant(s)	Act	Result
Yosefin Buohler (13)	Singing	Majority votes
Marcel Pietruch (10)	Hip-hop dance	Majority votes
Christoph Haese (21)	Trapeze artist	Majority votes
Shinouda Ayad (31)	Dervish dance	Majority votes
Carlos Fassanelli (44)	Singing	Judges' choice
Sophie Voskanian (7)	(Party-)Singing	Eliminated
Allgäupower (zwischen 35 and 42)	Music	Eliminated
Dennis Chmelensky (13)	Singing	Eliminated
Lena Fink (11)	Singing	Eliminated
Paula Hessel-Sousa (21)	Samba	Eliminated
Amplify (zwischen 18 und 22)	Punk rock	Eliminated
Anthony Bauer (36)	Singing	Eliminated

== Final ==
Results of the final of 29 November 2008
Name(s)	Date/ Place of Birth	Talent	Result (%)
Michael Hirte	10 October 1964 in Spremberg	Harmonica	72.62%
Kelvin Kalvus	19 May 1968 in Erfurt	Contact juggling	8.47%
Marcel Pietruch	26 March 1998 in Bremerhaven	Dance	4.96%
Vanessa Krasniqi	22 June 1994 in Iserlohn	Singing	4.94%
Yosefin Buohler	6 June 1995 in Cologne	Singing	1.78%
Christoph Haese	1 October 1987 in Kaufbeuren	Trapeze	1.77%
Shinouda Ayad	1 October 1976 in Luxor, Egypt lives in Kiel	Derwish	1.72%
Lucas Wecker	8 May 1996 in Lübeck	Violin	1.71%
Carlos Fassanelli	27 March 1964 in Buenos Aires, Argentina lives in Bayreuth	Singing	1.07%
Duri Krasniqi	3. März 1996 in Peć, Kosovo; lives in Spittal an der Drau, Österreich	Singing	0.96%
