= Das Supertalent season 4 =

Das Supertalent
- Season 4
- Hosted by: Marco Schreyl; Daniel Hartwich
- Judges: Dieter Bohlen; Sylvie van der Vaart; Bruce Darnell
- Winner: Freddy Sahin-Scholl
- Runner-up: Michael Holderbusch

Release
- Original network: RTL
- Original release: 24 September – 18 December 2010

Season chronology
- ← Previous; Season 3 Next → Season 5

The fourth season of the German talent show Das Supertalent premiered on September 24, 2010. Once again, Bruce Darnell, Dieter Bohlen and Sylvie van der Vaart all returned as Judges, while Daniel Hartwich and Marco Schreyl returned as hosts. Season 4 had approximately 40,700 applicants, making it the highest amount of applicants in the show's history. The auditions began filming on May 16, 2010 in Frankfurt am Main. Other audition locations were Stuttgart, Nuremberg, Munich, Hamburg, Hanover, Leipzig, Berlin, Bochum and finally Cologne on June 20, 2010.

When the first auditions episode was broadcast, it had the best viewing figures for an opening episode out of all seasons: 7.47 million viewers. The second episode the following day topped that with 7.74 million viewers. The final was viewed by 10.07 million.

The number of episodes in the season was increased to 15, while the number of Semi-Final episodes were increased from three to four. In each Semi-Final, 10 acts performed, with the public voting two acts through to the final, and the judges collectively deciding on the third, ending with 12 finalists. The Semi-Finals began on November 27. The eventual winner of the competition and the €100,000, was opera Singer Freddy Sahin-Scholl. The following below lists the results of each participant's overall performance in this series:

Winner | Runner-up | Finalist | Semi-finalist | Judges' Wildcard Finalist

Participant	Genre	Act	Semi-final	Result
Andrea Renzullo	Music	Singer	1	Finalist
Anthony Wandruschka	Acrobatics	Aerialist	3	Eliminated
Bubble Beatz	Music	Percussion on Trash	3	Finalist
Busty Heart	Variety	Variety Act	2	Eliminated
Dancefloor Destruction	Dance	Dance Group	4	Eliminated
Daniele Domizio	Dance	Michael Jackson Impersonator	1	Finalist
Darko Kordic	Music	Singer	4	Finalist
Dickson Oppong	Variety	Variety Act	1	Eliminated
Die Goldies	Music	Choir	4	Eliminated
Emilia Arata	Acrobatics	Aerialist	1	Eliminated
Freddy Sahin-Scholl	Music	Opera Singer	2	Winner
Harry Keaton	Variety	Glass breaking Singer	1	Eliminated
Josefine Becker	Music	Singer	3	Eliminated
Kai Leclerc	Variety	Variety Act	3	Eliminated
Korea Lee	Music	Violinist	2	Eliminated
Kurt Späth	Danger	Freakshow	1	Eliminated
Laura Rieger	Music	Singer	2	Eliminated
Liz Schneider	Music	Cellist	3	Eliminated
Manuela Wirth	Music	Singer	3	Eliminated
Marc Eggers	Dance	Breakdancer	3	Eliminated
Martin Bolze	Variety	Hypnotist	1	Eliminated
Michael Hemmersbach	Music	Singer & Guitarist	3	Eliminated
Michael Holderbusch	Music	Singer	3	Runner-up
Natalja Nezelja	Variety	Sand Artist	1	Finalist
Nilson and Zito	Dance	Dance Duo	4	Eliminated
Pellegrini Brothers	Acrobatics	Acrobat Group	2	Eliminated
Peter Wehrmann	Music	Beatboxer	4	Eliminated
Petr and Antonin	Music	Musician Duo	4	Eliminated
Ramona Fottner	Music	Singer	2	Finalist
Robert Maaser	Acrobatics	Wheel Acrobat	1	Eliminated
Ruddy Estevez	Music	Opera Singer	4	Finalist
Ryan Lam	Danger	Sword Act	2	Eliminated
Sonja Pesie	Music	Singer	4	Eliminated
Stevie Starr	Danger	Professional Regurgitator	3	Finalist
Tanja Grünewald	Music	Singer	1	Eliminated
Thomas Lohse	Music	Pianist	4	Finalist
Timothy Patch	Variety	Naked Artist	4	Eliminated
Tobias Diesner	Variety	Balloon Act	1	Eliminated
Tobias Kramer	Dance	Deaf Dancer	2	Finalist
Yevgeniya Stöcklin	Dance	Pole Dancer	2	Eliminated

== Semi-final summary ==
Buzzed out | Won Public Vote | Won Judges' Choice | Eliminated

=== Semi-final 1 (November 27, 2010) ===
Semi-Finalist	Order	Buzzes			Result
Semi-Finalist	Order	Bohlen	Van der Vaart	Darnell	Result
Daniele Domizio	1				Advanced (Judges' Choice)
Tobias Diesner	2				Eliminated
Tanja Grünewald	3				Eliminated
Robert Maaser	4				Eliminated
Emilia Arata	5				Eliminated
Harry Keaton	6				Eliminated
Andrea Renzullo	7				Advanced (Won Public Vote)
Kurt Späth	8				Eliminated
Natalja Nezelja	9				Advanced (Won Public Vote)
Martin Bolze	10				Eliminated

=== Semi-final 2 (December 4, 2010) ===
Semi-Finalist	Order	Buzzes			Result
Semi-Finalist	Order	Bohlen	Van der Vaart	Darnell	Result
Ryan Lam	1				Eliminated
Korea Lee	2				Eliminated
Pellegrini Brothers	3				Eliminated
Dickson Oppong	4				Eliminated
Laura Rieger	5				Eliminated
Yevgeniya Stöcklin	6				Eliminated
Ramona Fottner	7				Advanced (Judges' Choice)
Tobias Kramer	8				Advanced (Won Public Vote)
Busty Heart	9				Eliminated
Freddy Sahin-Scholl	10				Advanced (Won Public Vote)

=== Semi-final 3 (December 11) ===
Semi-Finalist	Order	Buzzes			Result
Semi-Finalist	Order	Bohlen	Van der Vaart	Darnell	Result
Kai Leclerc	1				Eliminated
Manuela Wirth	2				Eliminated
Bubble Beatz	3				Advanced (Won Public Vote)
Josefine Becker	4				Eliminated
Anthony Wandruschka	5				Eliminated
Michael Hemmersbach	6				Eliminated
Marc Eggers	7				Eliminated
Stevie Starr	8				Advanced (Judges' Choice)
Liz Schneider	9				Eliminated
Michael Holderbusch	10				Advanced (Won Public Vote)

=== Semi-final 4 (December 15) ===
Semi-Finalist	Order	Buzzes			Result
Semi-Finalist	Order	Bohlen	Van der Vaart	Darnell	Result
Dancefloor Destruction	1				Eliminated
Sonja Pesie	2				Eliminated
Petr and Antonin	3				Eliminated
Ruddy Estevez	4				Advanced (Judges' Choice)
Peter Wehrmann	5				Eliminated
Nilson and Zito	6				Eliminated
Thomas Lohse	7				Advanced (Won Public Vote)
Die Goldies	8				Eliminated
Timothy Patch	9				Eliminated
Darko Kordic	10				Advanced (Won Public Vote)

== Final (December 18) ==
Finalist	Order	Result & Voting Percentage
Daniele Domizio	1	11th (3.48%)
Ramona Fottner	2	5th (7.91%)
Bubble Beatz	3	10th (5.20%)
Andrea Renzullo	4	4th (9.65%)
Ruddy Estevez	5	12th (1.34%)
Natalja Netselja	6	6th (6.26%)
Darko Kordic	7	8th (5.76%)
Thomas Lohse	8	9th (5.75%)
Michael Holderbusch	9	Runner-up (15.69%)
Stevie Starr	10	7th (5.82%)
Tobias Kramer	11	3rd (10.30%)
Freddy Sahin-Scholl	12	Winner (22.84%)
