= Das Supertalent season 3 =

Das Supertalent
- Season 3
- Hosted by: Marco Schreyl; Daniel Hartwich
- Judges: Dieter Bohlen; Sylvie van der Vaart; Bruce Darnell
- Winner: Yvo Antoni & PrimaDonna
- Runner-up: Vanessa Calcagno

Release
- Original network: RTL
- Original release: 18 October – 22 November 2009

Season chronology
- ← Previous; Season 2 Next → Season 4

The third season of the German talent show Das Supertalent began on Friday, October 16, 2009. Subsequent episodes were broadcast every Saturday from October 17, 2009, to December 19, 2009. This season saw participants compete for a grand prize of €100,000. Due to the high viewing figures from the previous season, RTL increased the number of audition episodes from four to seven and the number of semi-final episodes from two to three. The Judging Panel once again consisted of Dieter Bohlen, Bruce Darnell and Sylvie van der Vaart. The season was again hosted by Marco Schreyl and Daniel Hartwich.

Of the 30 semi-finalists, ten appeared in each of the three semi-final shows, and the public voted three participants directly into the final. It was planned that the judges would select the tenth finalist from the remaining 21 candidates at the end of the third semi-final show. However, as the panel could not agree on a single candidate, each of the three judges was given a wildcard, resulting in a total of twelve finalists instead of the planned ten.

The eventual winner of the third season was Yvo Antoni, who presented a dog training routine with his dog PrimaDonna The runner-up, singer Vanessa Calcagno, and the third-placed pan flute player Petruța Küpper, released music albums after the finale.

From 26 January to 7 February 2010, the twelve finalists went on tour, performing together in twelve German cities. The following below lists the results of each participant's overall performance in this series:

Winner | Runner-up | Finalist | Semi-finalist | Judges' Wildcard Finalist

Participant	Genre	Act	Semi-final	Result
Ashley Maria Zimmermann	Music	Singer	1	Eliminated
Barbara Buchholz	Music	Theremin	3	Eliminated
Carlotta Truman	Music	Singer	3	Finalist
Charlin Sperlich	Music	Singer	1	Eliminated
Claudia Ritt and Sarah Sacher	Music	Musician Duo	2	Eliminated
Davy Kaufmann	Music	Singer	1	Finalist
Die Kantonputen	Variety	Male Strip Act	1	Eliminated
Ethan Jerome Coleman	Dance	Hip-Hop Dancer	2	Eliminated
Fabienne Bender	Music	Blind Singer & Keyboardist	3	Finalist
Hannes "Saraph" Schwarz	Danger	Fire Act	3	Finalist
Joel Gläfke	Dance	Hip-Hop Dancer	1	Eliminated
Johan Wellton	Variety	Juggler	1	Eliminated
Karin Andreev	Music	Singer	3	Finalist
Khosbayar Dangaa and Tsolmon Enkhbayar	Music	Oberton Singing Duo	3	Eliminated
Maria Cassius	Music	Rock Singer	3	Eliminated
Mr. Methane	Variety	Passing Gas	1	Eliminated
Natalia Macauley	Acrobatics	Water Acrobat	1	Eliminated
Oliver Roemer	Music	Singer	2	Finalist
Petruta Küpper	Music	Panpipe Player	2	Finalist
Raphael and Sébastien	Dance	Dance Duo	3	Eliminated
RecyKlang	Music	Band	3	Eliminated
* Richard Istel	Music	Singer	2	Finalist
Roma and Sven	Variety	Roller Skating Duo	2	Eliminated
Sven and Sebastian	Acrobatics	Trapeze and Taiko Duo	2	Finalist
Tamina Geuting	Music	Singer	2	Finalist
United Four	Music	Rock Band	3	Eliminated
Vanessa Calcagno	Music	Opera Singer	1	Runner-up
Vicky Lewis-Thumm	Dance	Serpentine Dancer	2	Eliminated
Yvo Antoni and PrimaDonna	Animals	Dog Act	1	Winner

== Semi-final summary ==
Buzzed out | Judges' Wildcard Pick | 1st in public vote | 2nd/3rd in public vote | Eliminated

=== Semi-final 1 (November 28, 2009) ===
Semi-Finalist	Order	Buzzes			Result
Semi-Finalist	Order	Bohlen	Van der Vaart	Darnell	Result
Ashley Maria Zimmermann	1				8th - Eliminated
Valentin Urse	2				6th - Eliminated
Charlin Sperlich	3				5th - Eliminated
Natalia Macauley	4				9th - Eliminated
Joel Gläfke	5				4th - Eliminated
Yvo Antoni and PrimaDonna	6				3rd - Advanced
Davy Kaufmann	7				2nd - Advanced
Johan Wellton	8				7th - Eliminated
Mr. Methane	9				10th - Eliminated
Vanessa Calcagno	10				1st - Advanced

=== Semi-final 2 (December 5, 2009) ===
Semi-Finalist	Order	Buzzes			Result
Semi-Finalist	Order	Bohlen	Van der Vaart	Darnell	Result
Die Kantonputen	1				10th - Eliminated
Claudia Ritt and Sarah Sacher	2				7th - Eliminated
Ethan Jerome Coleman	3				5th - Eliminated
Richard Istel	4				3rd - Advanced
Sven and Sebastian	5				6th - Eliminated (Van der Vaart's Wildcard)
Tamina Geuting	6				4th - Eliminated (Bohlen's Wildcard)
Vicky Lewis-Thumm	7				9th - Eliminated
Oliver Roemer	8				2nd - Advanced
Roma and Sven	9				8th - Eliminated
Petruta Küpper	10				1st - Advanced

=== Semi-finals 3 (December 12, 2009) ===
Semi-Finalist	Order	Buzzes			Result
Semi-Finalist	Order	Bohlen	Van der Vaart	Darnell	Result
Maria Cassius	1				8th - Eliminated
Raphael and Sébastien	2				6th - Eliminated
Karin Andreev	3				3rd - Advanced
Khosbayar Dangaa and Tsolmon Enkhbayar	4				7th - Eliminated
United Four	5				5th - Eliminated
Carlotta Truman	6				2nd - Advanced
RecyKlang	7				10th - Eliminated
Fabienne Bender	8				1st - Advanced
Barbara Buchholz	9				9th - Eliminated
Hannes "Saraph" Schwarz	10				4th - Eliminated (Darnell's Wildcard)

== Final (December 19, 2009) ==
Finalist	Order	Result & Voting Percentage
Tamina Geuting	1	10th (5.00%)
Yvo Antoni and PrimaDonna	2	Winner (13.50%)
Oliver Roemer	3	7th (8.10%)
Richard Istel	4	5th (9.80%)
Carlotta Truman	5	11th (4.60%)
Sven and Sebastian	6	12th (1.30%)
Fabienne Bender	7	6th (9.30%)
Karin Andreev	8	8th (7.30%)
Hannes "Saraph" Schwarz	9	9th (5.40%)
Petruta Küpper	10	3rd (11.50%)
Vanessa Calcagno	11	Runner-up (13.40%)
Davy Kaufmann	12	4th (10.80%)
