= Carlotta Truman =

German singer

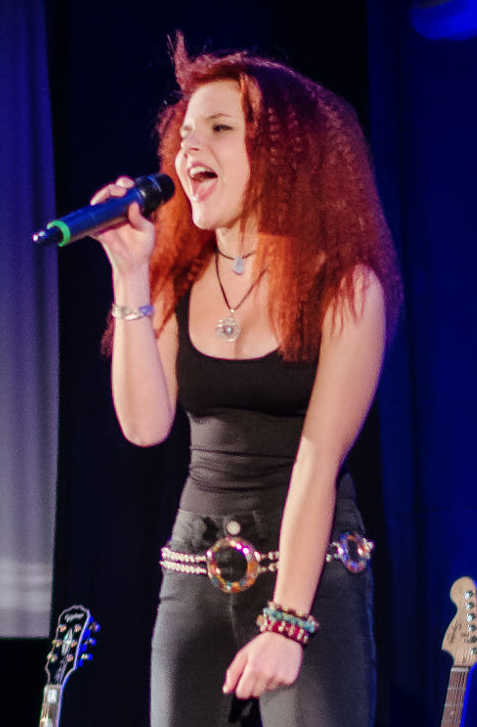
- Carlotta Truman in concert in 2014

Background information
- Born: 19 October 1999 (age 26); Garbsen, Hanover, Germany
- Genres: Pop, pop rock
- Occupation: Singer
- Years active: 2009–present
- Website: carlotta-truman.com

Carlotta Truman (born 19 October 1999) is a German singer and a finalist in season 3 of Das Supertalent 2009 and The Voice Kids 2014. She represented Germany in the Eurovision Song Contest 2019 as part of the duo Sisters with the song "Sister", after winning the German national selection Unser Lied für Israel.

== Career ==
Truman had her first appearance on the stage at the age of one and a half. She was a finalist in the German version of Got Talent – Das Supertalent – at the age of nine. A tour of Germany followed, along with a live appearance in the National Television show Our Show For Germany. She was a regular soloist with the Hanover federal Police Orchestra, including a performance for the German President at the Presidential Palace in Bonn (Villa Hammerschmidt). In December 2011 Truman was awarded the 29th German Rock and Pop prize for the Best Singer in Germany (the youngest ever) as well as picking up four other awards at the prestigious ceremony. In 2014 Truman was a contestant at the show The Voice Kids. She made it to the final and gained the second place. She grew up in a German-British family.

In 2019, she represented Germany in the Eurovision Song Contest along with Laurita Spinelli as part of Sisters. They came 25th with 24 points. In February 2020, the duo disbanded.

She is currently part of electronic pop duo Amos Fleur with producer Simon Leander. Their debut single "Lyar" was released in October 2021.

== Discography ==
- "All in the Game" feat. LayZee (2010)

== Filmography ==
- 2019: In aller Freundschaft – Die jungen Ärzte
- 2020: Nachtschwestern

== Awards and nominations ==
Year	Award	Category	Age	Result
2011	Deutschen Rock & Pop Preis (German Rock & Pop Award) 2011	Best Solo Singer Germany	12	Won

Preceded by Michael Schulte with "You Let Me Walk Alone"	Germany in the Eurovision Song Contest (as part of Sisters); 2019	Succeeded by Ben Dolic with "Violent Thing"
