= Guido Maria Kretschmer =

German fashion designer and television personality

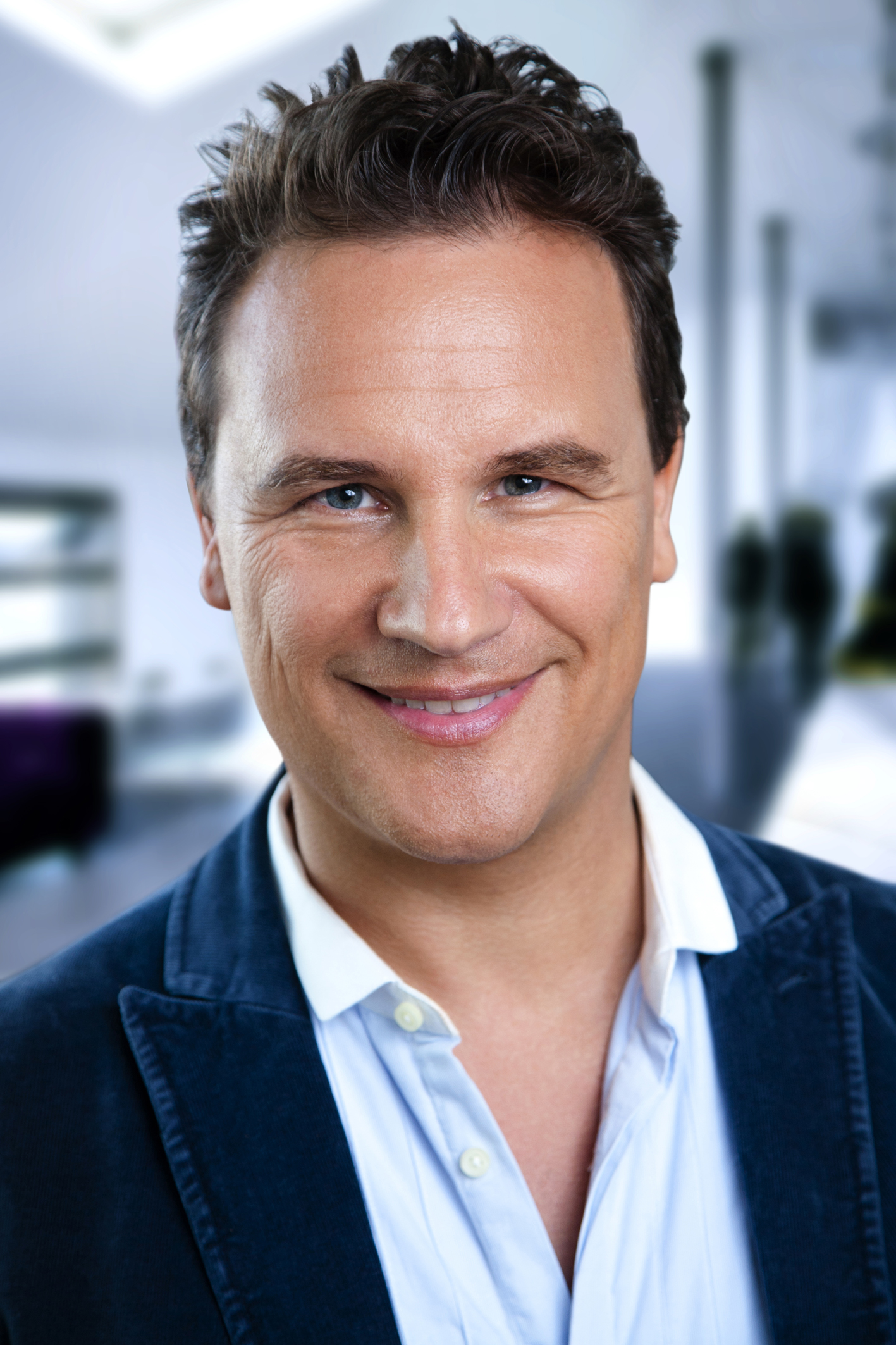
- Guido Maria Kretschmer in 2012
- Born: 11 May 1965 (age 60); Münster, Northrhine-Westphalia, West Germany
- Labels: Guido Maria Kretschmer Corporate Fashion; Guido Maria Couture
- Spouse: Frank Mutters (civil union since 2012) (m. 2018)

Guido Maria Kretschmer (born 11 May 1965) is a German fashion designer and television personality. He has worked as presenter and juror on programmes such as Shopping Queen.

== Life and career ==
Guido Maria Kretschmer was born in Münster, Germany, on 11 May 1965 and grew up in Einen, Warendorf. After two semesters of studying medicine, he began his career as a designer in Ibiza on the popular hippie market of the island with a small stand of clothes that he had sewn himself. This earned him the attention of German musician Udo Lindenberg, who ordered brocade jackets for his tour. In 1987, Kretschmer founded the company GMK by pepper, with its headquarters in Münster and Palma, as well as the fashion label Guido Maria Kretschmer Corporate Fashion. Initially with three employees, he mostly worked as designer for large companies. His first large-scale order was the creation of uniforms for crew members of the airline Hapag-Lloyd Flug, along with work outfits for Deutsche Telekom, Kempinski, Hotel Maritim, and the airline Emirates. He also designed around 2.5 million suits for the TUI Group.

In 2004, Kretschmer founded the label Guido Maria Couture, with which he reached his creative focal point, designing cocktail dresses and evening gowns as well as the associated accessories. His first fashion shows in this field were held in Shanghai and Tokyo. In 2005, he presented his creations for the first time at the Berlin Fashion Week. After he was chosen by German actress Katharina Thalbach to design the stage outfits for an Oscar Wilde play, he began designing for various theatre and film productions, such as for a production of The Barber of Seville by the Deutsche Oper Berlin. In the film field, he designed the outfits for Hands off Mississippi, Messy Christmas, and Woman in Love. In the latter two, he also had guest roles. His label is regularly represented on large fashion shows and celebrities such as Charlize Theron, Jane Seymour, Patricia Kaas, Iris Berben, Martina Gedeck, Jasmin Wagner, and Heino Ferch have worn his creations. He maintains showrooms in Münster, Berlin, and Palma, and opened a shop in Munich in 2009.

Since January 2012, Kretschmer has been presenting the television show Shopping Queen on VOX as well as its celebrity version since April of the same year. In March 2012, he entered a civil union with his longtime partner Frank Mutters at the Rathaus Schöneberg; they would later be married in 2018. A special collection named "Guido Maria Kretschmer for eBay" was developed up until 23 April 2013 as part of a crowdsourcing project in which visitors of the project page could vote on the collection and its production. Also in 2013, he published his first book, Anziehungskraft: Stil kennt keine Größe. In 2013 and 2014, Kretschmer was a judge on Das Supertalent, the German instalment of the Got Talent franchise, alongside Dieter Bohlen, Bruce Darnell, and Lena Gercke. Since the autumn of 2014, he has been advertising for the OGI Oil & Gas Invest AG. He is an ambassador of the Stiftung Deutsche Schlaganfall-Hilfe. In May 2018, he was part of the presenter team for RTL's broadcast of the wedding of Prince Harry and Meghan Markle, alongside Frauke Ludowig. RTL's reporting as well as that of concurrent channel ZDF were criticised for being "disrespectful" and "racist".

== Filmography ==
=== Film ===
- 2007 – Messy Christmas
- 2010 – Life Is Too Long
- 2011 – Woman in Love
- 2018 – Wuff – Folge dem Hund

=== Television ===
- 2012 – Das perfekte Model (juror)
- Since 2012 – Shopping Queen (commentator and juror)
- Since 2012 – Promi Shopping Queen (commentator and juror)
- 2013 and 2014 – Das Supertalent (juror)
- 2014 – Hotter Than My Daughter (presenter)
- 2015 – Deutschlands schönste Frau (presenter)
- 2015 and 2016 – Geschickt eingefädelt – Wer näht am besten? (presenter)
- 2019: Grill den Henssler (guest, season 9 episode 1)
- 2019: Guidos Masterclass (juror and moderator)
- 2020: Big Performance - Wer ist der Star im Star? (juror)
- 2021: Guidos Deko Queen (commentator and juror)

== Bibliography ==
=== By Guido Maria Kretschmer ===
- Anziehungskraft: Stil kennt keine Größe. Edel, Hamburg 2014, ISBN 978-3-8419-0239-9.
- Eine Bluse macht noch keinen Sommer: Geschichten aus dem Kleiderschrank. Edel, Hamburg 2014, ISBN 978-3-8419-0326-6.

=== About Guido Maria Kretschmer ===
- Wellinghaus, Max – Guido (biography with coloured pictures) mvg, Munich 2015, ISBN 978-3-86882-592-3

== Awards ==
- 2002 – Winner of the World of TUI Design Award for the design concept Sand, Sea and Sky
- 2008 – Nachwuchsdesigner des Jahres on the occasion of the New Faces Award by magazine Bunte
- 2009 – Winner of the IF Design Award in Munich
- 2009 – Winner of the Telekom Corporate Fashion Design Award
- 2014 – Goldene Kamera for Beste Unterhaltung
- 2014 – Romy for Beste Unterhaltung
- 2014 – Deutscher Fernsehpreis for Bestes Dokutainment (for Shopping Queen)
- 2014 – Goldene Henne for his work as a presenter
- 2015 – Romy in the category Unterhaltung/Talk/Doku-Soap
- 2015 – Krawattenmann des Jahres
- 2016 – Radio Regenbogen Award in the category Medienmann des Jahres
