= World of Weird =

British television series

- Genre: Documentary
- Narrated by: Sarah Millican
- Country of origin: United Kingdom
- Original language: English
- No. of series: 1
- No. of episodes: 7

World of Weird is a British documentary series narrated by Sarah Millican. Vicky Pattison, Joel Dommett, Ayo Akinwolere, Ben Shires, Brent Zillwood and others meet people who undertake what are considered to be unusual activities, and after learning about the activity, then try it for themselves. It is broadcast on Channel 4. The pilot was shown in September 2015 and a six episode series began in September 2016.

== Episodes ==
=== Pilot ===
No.	Title	Original release date	Viewers (millions)
–	"Pilot"	22 September 2015	0.99
BronyCon, child matadors, an extreme polygamist, people preparing for the end of the world and people who are hired for social situations.

=== Series 1 ===
No.	Title	Original release date	Viewers (millions)
1	"Episode 1"	28 September 2016	0.78
Vampires in Texas, zentais in Tokyo, a pet capybara and Pricasso, who paints with his penis.
2	"Episode 2"	5 October 2016	Unknown
A crying agency in Tokyo, sploshing, a Japanese penis festival and a man who identifies as a dog.
3	"Episode 3"	12 October 2016	Unknown
Japanese love pillows, the Air Sex Championships, prancercise, cuddle cafés, Anklepants, anger rooms and the Red Sheep Agency.
4	"Episode 4"	19 October 2016	Unknown
Pony play, dog music, Japanese TV shows and Ted Parrotman.
5	"Episode 5"	26 October 2016	Unknown
Wizard school in Poland, a gigolo sex clown and the micronation Republic of Molossia.
6	"Episode 6"	2 November 2016	Unknown
A Japanese apology agency, furries, the devil jumps over babies and the Battle of the Nations.
