= Niclas Castello =

German contemporary artist (born 1978)

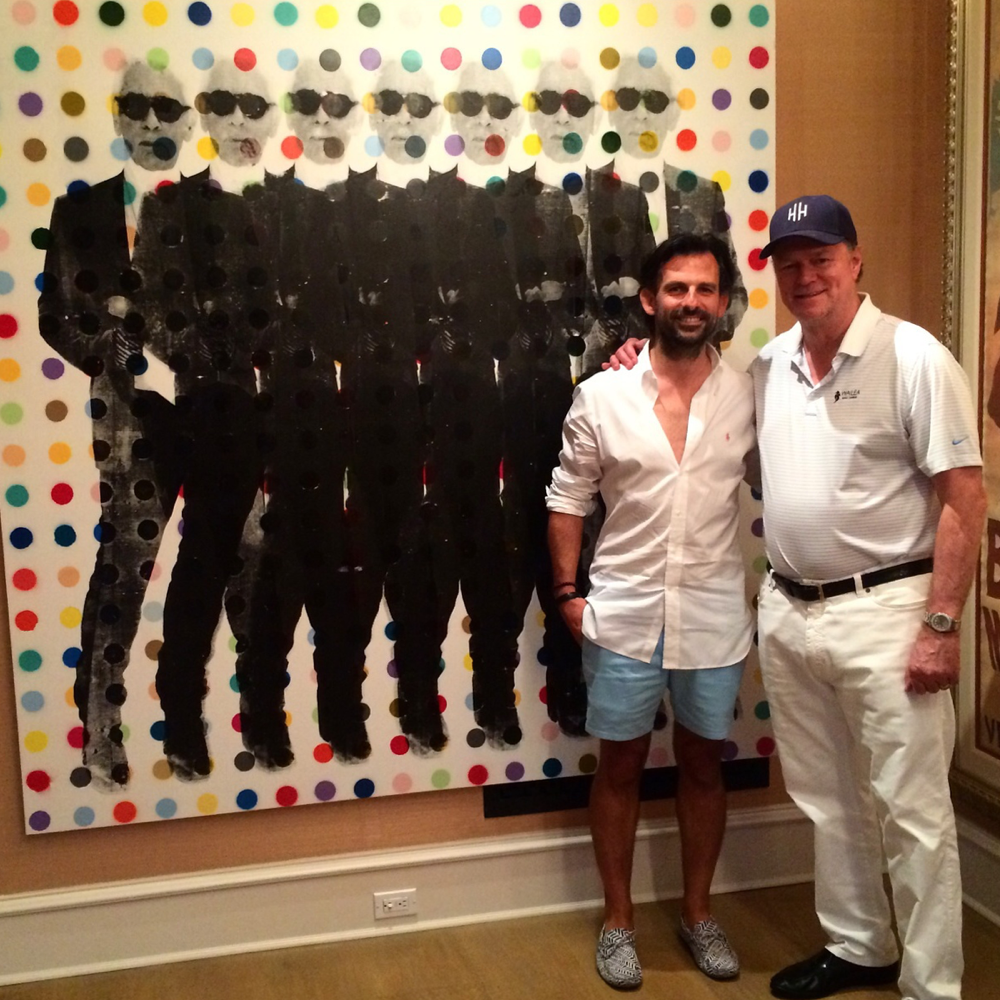
- Niclas Castello and Rick Hilton (2015)
- Born: July 21, 1978 (age 47); Neuhaus am Rennweg
- Known for: The Kiss sculptures
- Movement: pop art, street art
- Spouse: Sylvie Meis (m. 2020; sep. 2023)
- Website: niclascastello.com

Norbert Zerbs (born 1978 in Neuhaus am Rennweg), known professionally as Niclas Castello, is a German contemporary artist.

== Early life and career ==
Niclas Castello grew up in Neuhaus am Rennweg, East Germany. After living in Montmartre, Paris, he moved back to Germany in 2003, where he studied art at a private university, dropping out after two years. Castello then moved to New York City, where he was supported by Arleen Schloss, staying at Schloss' New York loft for about two years. From 2008 to 2015, he traveled and worked with galleries in Europe and the United States.

Castello has described the artist Invader as an influence. Castello's work includes a sculpture series titled The Kiss sculptures, and artwork depicting fire extinguishers. One of his works is in The One, a private residence in Bel Air, Los Angeles.

== Personal life ==
Castello married Sylvie Meis, a Dutch TV personality, on September 19, 2020 in Florence Italy. They split in June 2023.
