= Freddy Sahin-Scholl =

German singer and composer (born 1953)

- Born: Freddy Scholl; 21 December 1953 (age 72); Heilbronn, West Germany

Freddy Sahin-Scholl (born 21 December 1953 in Heilbronn as Freddy Scholl) is a German singer and composer. On 19 December 2010, he won season 4 of Das Supertalent and 100,000€. He was in the running to represent Austria in the Eurovision Song Contest 2011.

== Awards ==
1. 1980: Award Baden-Württemberg (Category Cabaret)
2. 2010: Das Supertalent (RTL)
