= Andrea Renzullo =

German singer and was a participant (born 1996)

- Born: Andrea Renzullo; 2 March 1996 (age 29); Sundern, Germany
- Occupation: Singer
- Years active: 2011–present

Andrea Renzullo (born 2 March 1996 in Sundern, North Rhine-Westphalia) is a German singer and was a participant who finished fourth in season 4 of Das Supertalent.

== Biography ==
=== Early life ===
Andrea Renzullo was born to Italian parents. Andrea became interested in music, with encouragement from his parents, at six years old.

=== Das Supertalent ===
Round	Song	Result
Audition		Recall
Semi-final	Run (Leona Lewis)	Voted into final
Final	Run (Leona Lewis)	9,65% (4/12)

=== Post-Supertalent ===
Andrea recorded his first single called "Heal". Andrea brought in Los Angeles-based music producer Klaus Derendorf to work with him on his first single. "Heal" came out on 18 March 2011. In 2014, he released his second single "Ricomincerò". In 2017, he participated in Deutschland sucht den Superstar and made it to the top-16. He couldn't take part in the liveshows because of a contract issue. In 2020, he released his new single "Million miles" (feat. JSUNT & JORN). In 2021, the single "L'amore cos'è" (feat. Giusy Trifino) followed. In 2023, he competed again in Deutschland sucht den Superstar and made it to the Top-25.

== Discography ==
=== Singles ===
Year	Title	Peak chart positions			Album
Year	Title	GER	AUT	SWI	Album
2011	"Heal"	82			
