= Ben Shires =

British television presenter and comedian

- Born: 7 February 1985 (age 41); Yorkshire, England
- Occupations: Presenter and comedian
- Years active: 2013–present
- Employer(s): BBC; UKTV
- Television: Officially Amazing
- Height: 6 ft 2 in (1.88 m)
- Website: benshires.com

Ben Shires is a British television presenter and comedian, currently working on TV channels CBBC and Dave. He hosts the Guinness World Records-themed children's show Officially Amazing, and is also a radio presenter on Heart Yorkshire.

== Career ==
Shires initially aspired to be a lawyer. He was in a contest to become a new presenter for Channel 4's scheduling slot T4, but came up short. In 2013, he was employed by the BBC, and Officially Amazing began airing and has produced seven series since then. Shires presents alongside Haruka Kuroda and Al Jackson.

In 2015, Shires started presenting Match of the Day Kickabout, a spin-off of MOTD, designed for children. It was previously presented by Ore Oduba and Radzi Chinyanganya.

On 4 January 2016, he came joint second in Celebrity Mastermind, with his specialist subject being Leeds United.

In 2016, Shires hosted World of Weird for Channel 4 and was in a Christmas celebrity special of Children quiz show Top Class.

In 2017, Shires was a contestant on Remotely Funny. He has written columns for The Huffington Post.

In 2020, during the COVID-19 pandemic, Shires hosted some of the BBC Bitesize Daily home-schooling shows.

== Television credits ==
Year	Title	Role	Channel
2013–2018	Officially Amazing	Presenter	CBBC
2014	Fake Reaction	Himself	ITV2
2014	Hacker Time	Himself	CBBC
2015–2021	Match of the Day Kickabout	Presenter	CBBC BBC Two
2016	World of Weird	Presenter	Channel 4
2016	Mastermind	Contestant	BBC Two
2016	Top Class	Contestant	CBBC
2016	The Dog Ate My Homework	Himself	CBBC
2017	Marrying Mum and Dad	Presenter	CBBC
2017	Remotely Funny	Contestant	CBBC
2017	The Premier League Show	Himself	BBC Two
2018	All Over the Place	Presenter	CBBC
