= Leo Rojas =

Ecuadorian musician (born 1984)

- Born: 18 October 1984 (age 41); Otavalo, Ecuador
- Genres: Latin; Easy listening
- Occupation: Musician
- Instrument: Pan flute
- Years active: 2011–present

Juan Leonardo Santillan Rojas (born 18 October 1984) is an Ecuadorian musician. He won the fifth season of the television show Das Supertalent, the German version of Britain's Got Talent.

== Biography ==
Rojas came from his home country to Spain in 2000 while his family remained in Ecuador. From there, he went to Germany with a tourist visa repeatedly. He lives with his Polish wife in Berlin, where he made money as a street performer. A passerby informed him about the talent show Das Supertalent. He applied for the fifth season in 2011 and was able to qualify for the final rounds. With an interpretation of "El cóndor pasa" with the panflute and other South American wind instruments, he came through the semi-finals. This resulted in a reunion of the musician with his mother from Ecuador, causing an emotional performance. At the finals on 17 December 2011, Rojas played the instrumental track "The Lonely Shepherd", written by James Last, which had become a hit in 1977 when performed by Last and Gheorghe Zamfir. Rojas won the competition with a distinct lead.

His winning song was released after the competition and ranked at #48 on the German sales chart during the week of Christmas. On 27 January 2012, his first album of known instrumental pieces was released, titled "Spirit of the Hawk". Produced by Dieter Bohlen, the album reached the Top 5 on the charts in the German-speaking nations, and by the end of February had achieved gold status in Germany.

== Discography ==
=== Songs ===
- El condor pasa (2012)
- Der einsame Hirte (2012)
- Albatros (2014)
- Chaski (2015)
- Nature Spirits (2017)
- Hope (2020)

=== Albums ===
- Spirit of the Hawk (2012)
- Flying Heart (2012)
- Albatross (2013)
- Das Beste (2015)
- Leo Rojas (2017)
- Colours of Nature (2022)
