= Scott & Muriel =

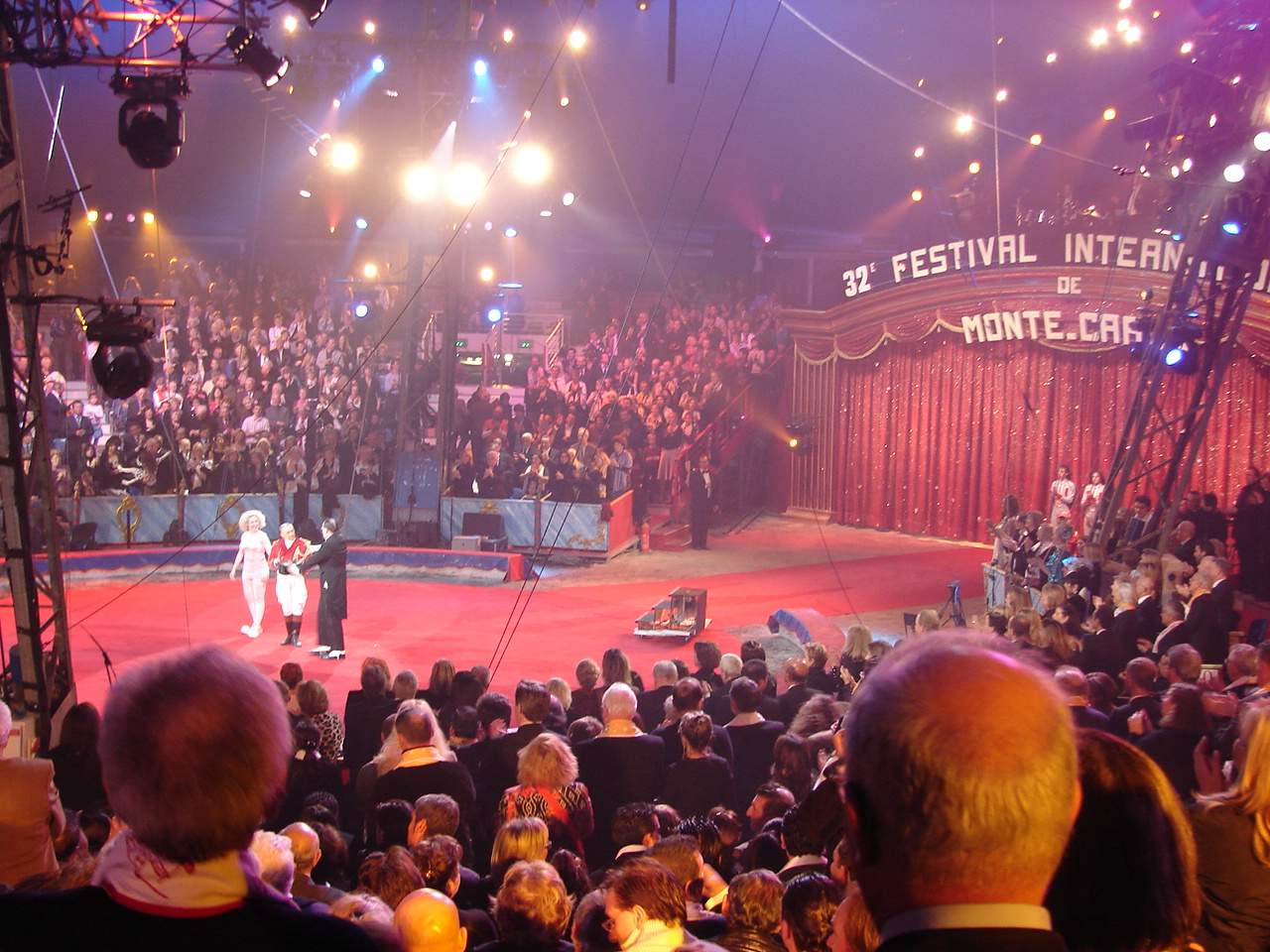
Scott & Muriel receive a standing ovation at the 32nd International Circus Festival of Monte-Carlo

Scott & Muriel is the stage name of the comedy duo Scott Nelson and Muriel Brugman, a husband and wife team of comedy illusionists and entertainers. Their style of performance can best be described as "slapstick magic," a combination of visual comedy, slapstick, modern clowning, and illusions.

All the material and illusions they perform they created, designed and built themselves.

They began working together in 1999. In June, 2000, they won the title "National Champions of Holland" at the Dutch National Congress of Magic.

One month later in July 2000, they won the highest award in magic, the FISM Grand Prix, and with it the title "World Champions of Magic." They are the first and only comedy magic duo to have won this award.

In 2002 they appeared at the famous Juste pour rire (Just for Laughs) festival in Montreal, Quebec, Canada.

In 2003 they were the only illusionists to work with Cirque du Soleil in the company's first television series, Solstrom.

In 2004 they created their first full evening show, Scott & Muriel's B!G Show with Joe!, together with Joe Dieffenbacher of the theater group Nakupelle. This show toured for three years in the Netherlands. It was produced by Kees van Liempt of Interpresario and directed by Pieter Athmer. The music was arranged and composed by Kino Haitsma. In 2006 Scott & Muriel took over the production of the show and it has since toured in Austria and Germany.

Scott & Muriel were semi-finalists in the popular TV show Holland’s Got Talent on SBS6 in 2007.

In 2008 they were invited to the 32nd edition of the International Circus Festival of Monte-Carlo. At the festival they were awarded the Nice-Matin Journalist Prize and the Special Prize from the Fairmont Hotel of Monaco. They were the first illusionists to appear in the festival since Lee Pee Ville in 1978.

At the 2nd World Festival of Clowns in Ekatrineburg, Russia, 2009, Scott & Muriel were awarded the Golden Clown.

In 2010-2011 they starred in the Palazzo dinner-theater show in Amsterdam, the Netherlands.

In 2011-2012 they starred in the Big Apple Circus in New York City, United States

In 2012-2013 they appeared in the show 'Seduction' at the Royal Palace cabaret in Kirrwiller, France

In 2014-2015 they appeared in the Weltweihnachtszirkus in Stuttgart, Germany

In 2016 they appeared in season 10 of Britain's Got Talent series.

They are currently busy touring with their 90-minute theater show "Scott & Muriel - The Accidental Illusionists... Fall in Love"

Scott & Muriel reside in the Netherlands.
