= Nazan Eckes =

German television personality

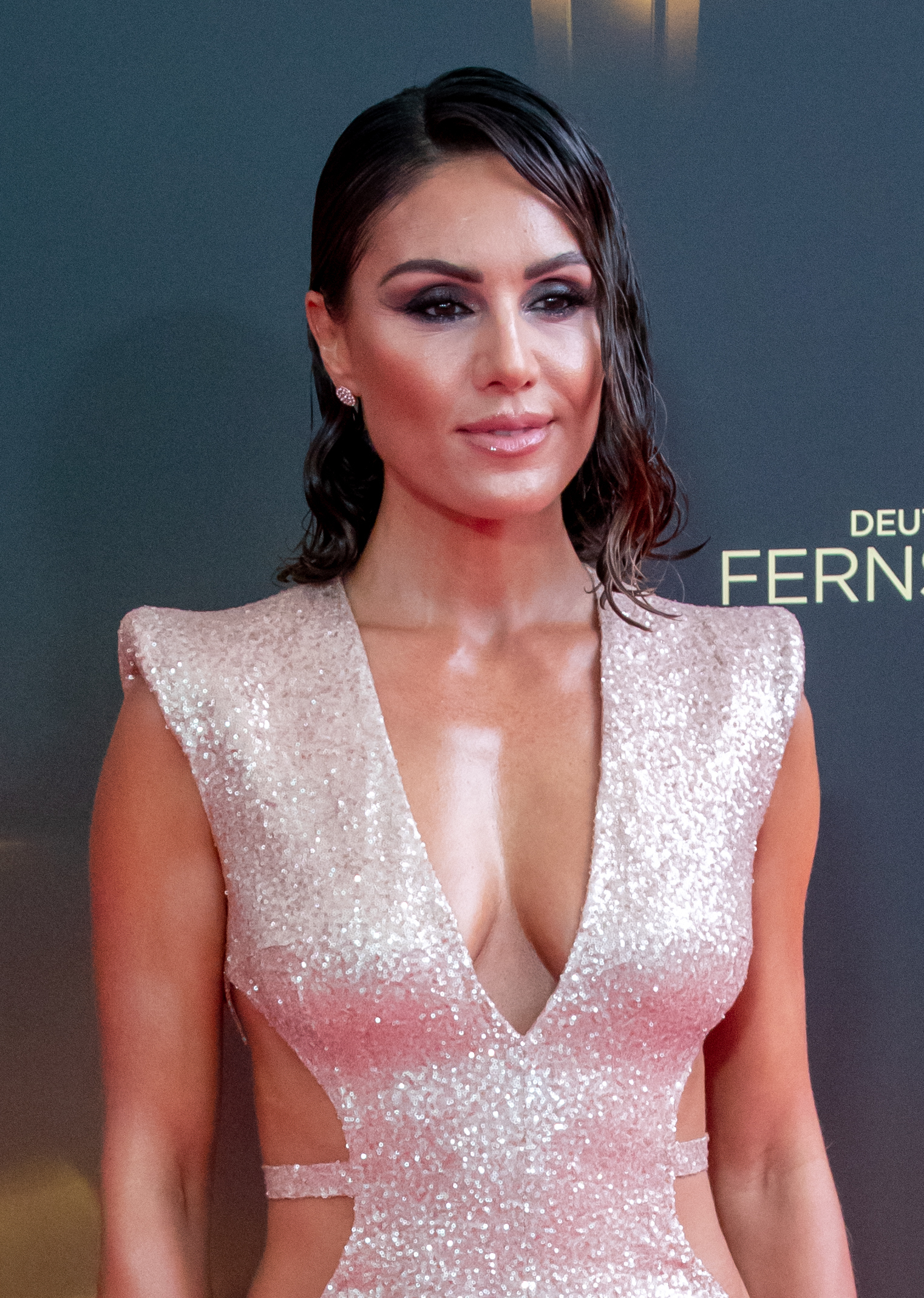
- Eckes in 2021
- Born: Nazan Üngör; 9 May 1976 (age 50); Cologne, North Rhine-Westphalia, West Germany
- Other name: Nazan Khol
- Occupation: Television presenter
- Organization: RTL II
- Spouses: Claus Eckes (m. 2000; div. 2007) Julian Khol (m. 2012; sep. 2020)
- Children: 2
- Relatives: Andreas Khol (father-in-law)
- Website: nazan-eckes.de

Nazan Khol (née Üngör; born 9 May 1976), better known as Nazan Eckes, is a German television presenter.

== Career ==
Eckes, daughter of Turkish immigrants from Eskişehir, completed her Abitur high school diploma in 1995 in Leverkusen, where her father was employed as a worker in a chemical and pharmaceutical company.

Her internship at the music television channel VIVA was followed by a formal journalistic apprenticeship (Volontariat) lasting 18 months at the same channel. In 1998, Eckes joined VIVA as a regular TV journalist. Between 1998 and 1999, she also worked as freelance reporter for the Turkish language regional newspaper Haftalık Posta.

In 1999, Eckes moved to Hamburg and presented the weather forecast for RTL Television's regional evening program, Guten Abend RTL. The next year, she presented the weather forecast in the local news program Punkt 12. She married Claus Eckes in 2000.

Since 28 January 2003, Eckes has regularly presented the RTL II News on weekdays. That year, she presented RTL Exclusiv and Life! – Die Lust zu leben as a stand-in for the regular presenters while they were on vacation. She also presented the World Music Awards with Ole Tillmann and Deutschlands beste Doppelgänger, a look-alike-show on Saturday nights with Mike Krüger. Eckes was briefly part of the presenting team for RTL's coverage of Formula One, presenting pieces on the city and/or country hosting the event. This was spun off into a separate programme entitled Formel Exclusiv in which she presented lifestyle and glamour themes nominally related to Formula One.

From June 2004 on, she hosted Life! – Die Lust zu leben and also assumed presentation of Bosporus Trend and RTL II Jahresrückblick, an end-of-year review of 2004 and 2005.

In 2006, she hosted "Let's Dance" with Hape Kerkeling, the German version of television series Dancing with the Stars. In October 2006, she presented Das große TV-Quiz, a quiz program. She also played a journalist in the German television comedy Crazy Race 3 – Sie knacken jedes Schloss.

In 2007, Eckes hosted the second season of Let’s Dance Again with Hape Kerkeling and also the episode Harry Potter and the Order of the Phoenix – The great RTL-Special.

In 2009 and 2010, Eckes is Pantene Pro V's testimonial in Germany.

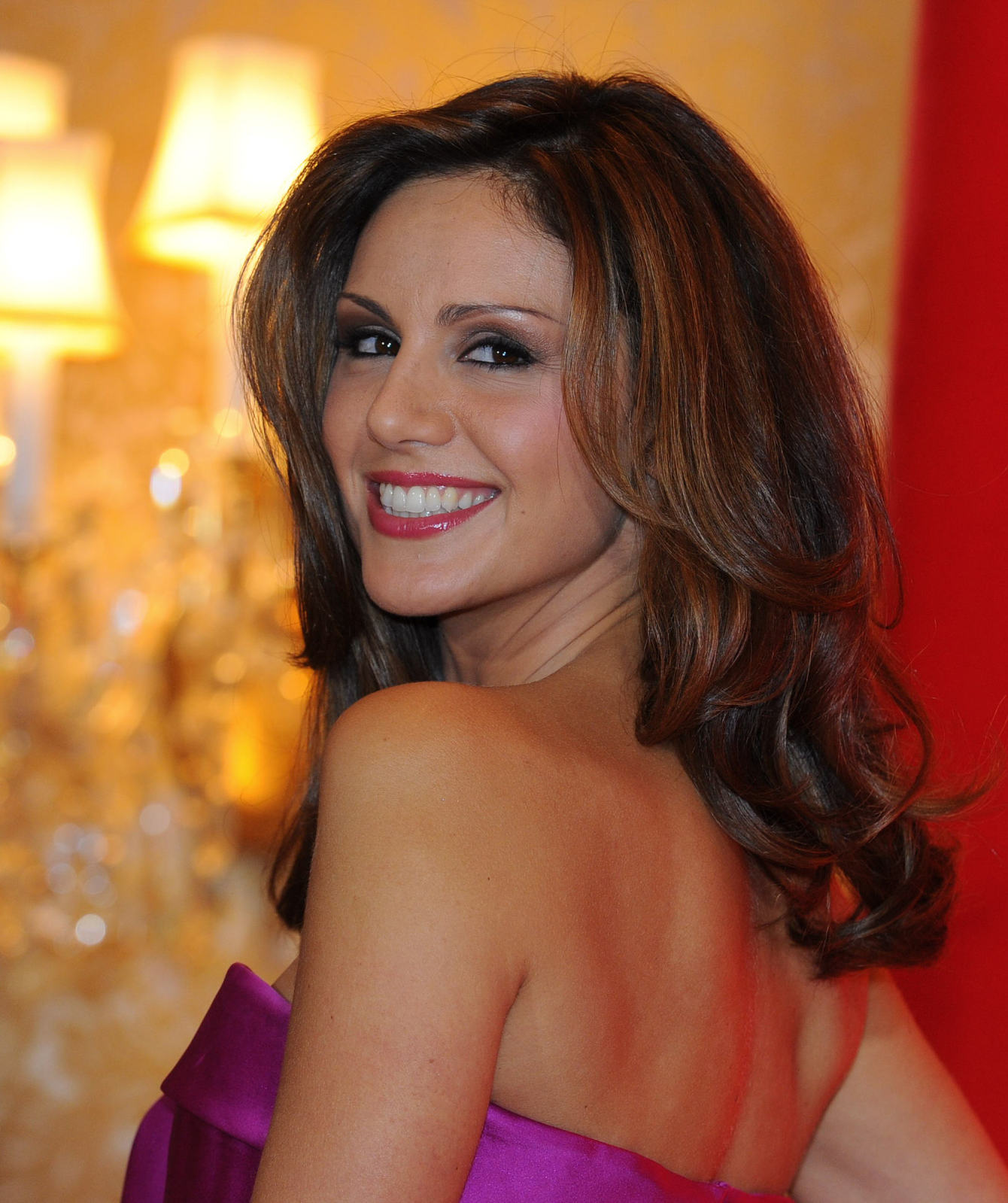
Eckes in 2013

In 2016, Eckes partnered with Clinique, joining the Clinique Difference Initiative alongside six other inspiring women as Difference Makers with an aim to empower and encourage education amongst women.

In 2019, Eckes took part as a candidate in Let’s Dance, the RTL show she once hosted.

== Personal life ==
She was married to Claus Eckes from February 2000 until their divorce in 2007. In June 2012, she married painter and former model Julian Khol, the youngest son of Austrian People's Party politician Andreas Khol. They have two children, both boys.
