= Daniel Hartwich =

German TV presenter

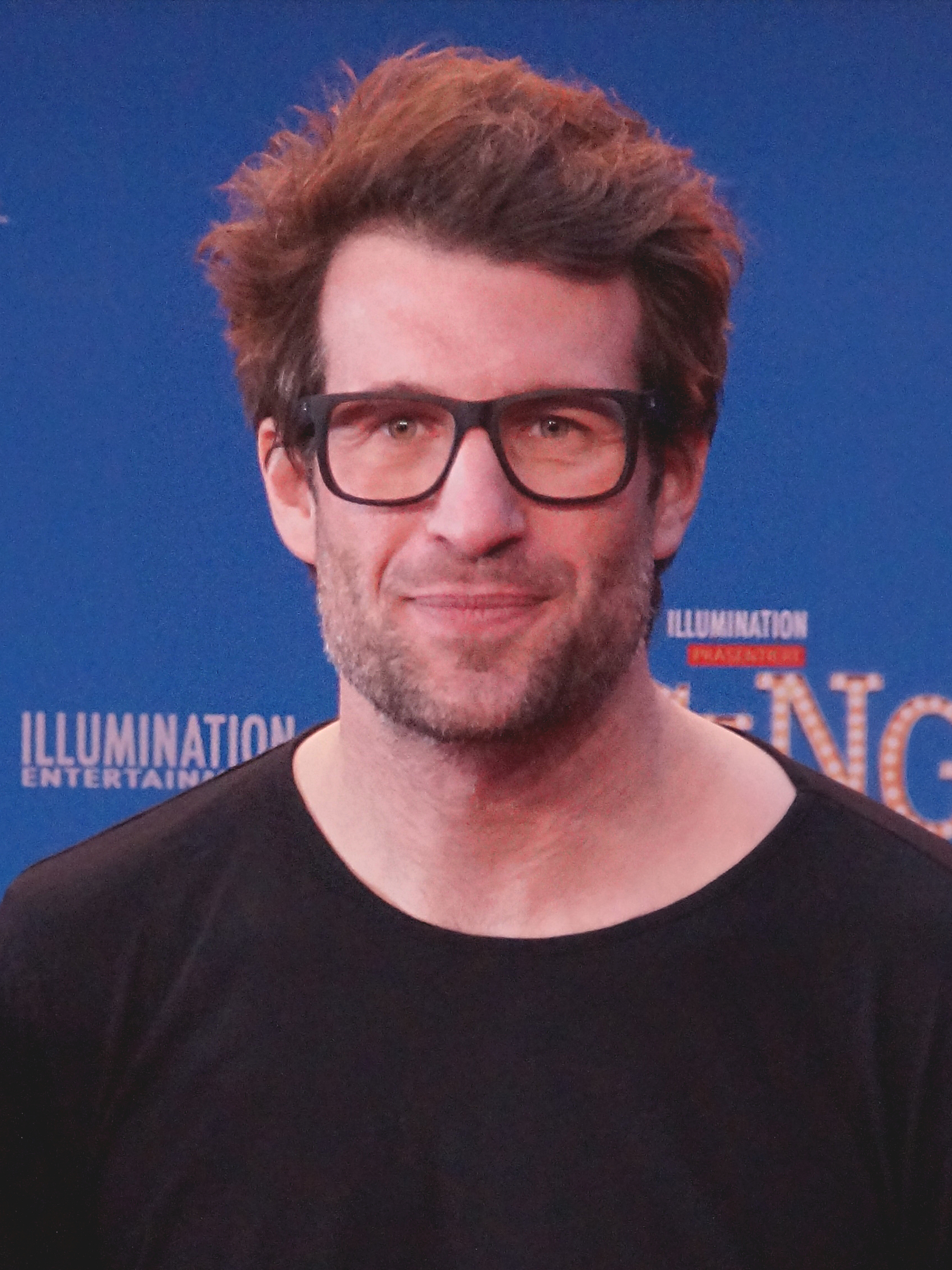
- Hartwich in 2016
- Born: 18 August 1978 (age 48); Frankfurt, West Germany
- Occupation: TV presenter
- Years active: 1998–present

Daniel Hartwich (born 18 August 1978) is a German TV presenter.

== Biography ==
Hartwich's mother is a nurse. After completing his Abitur in 1998, he studied German and political science at Goethe University in Frankfurt. During his studies, he began to work as a reporter and presenter for radio and television. He first worked for Hessischer Rundfunk. After his entry as a reporter at their studio in Kassel, he hosted the morning show at hrXXL. After changes within the show, Hartwich hosted the shows hr3 Madhouse and 0138/ 6000. He also hosted shows at You FM. For his presentation of YOU FM Roadshow, he earned his first radio gig.

He hosted the ZDF/KI.KA broadcast of TKKG – Der Club der Detektive. After a short guest performance at DMAX, he became committed to the RTL Group. After various stints as a reporter (Fit for Fun TV and Wissenshunger) at VOX, he got his own late night show on RTL, Achtung! Hartwich, for which he was nominated for the Deutscher Fernsehpreis and the Deutscher Comedypreis.

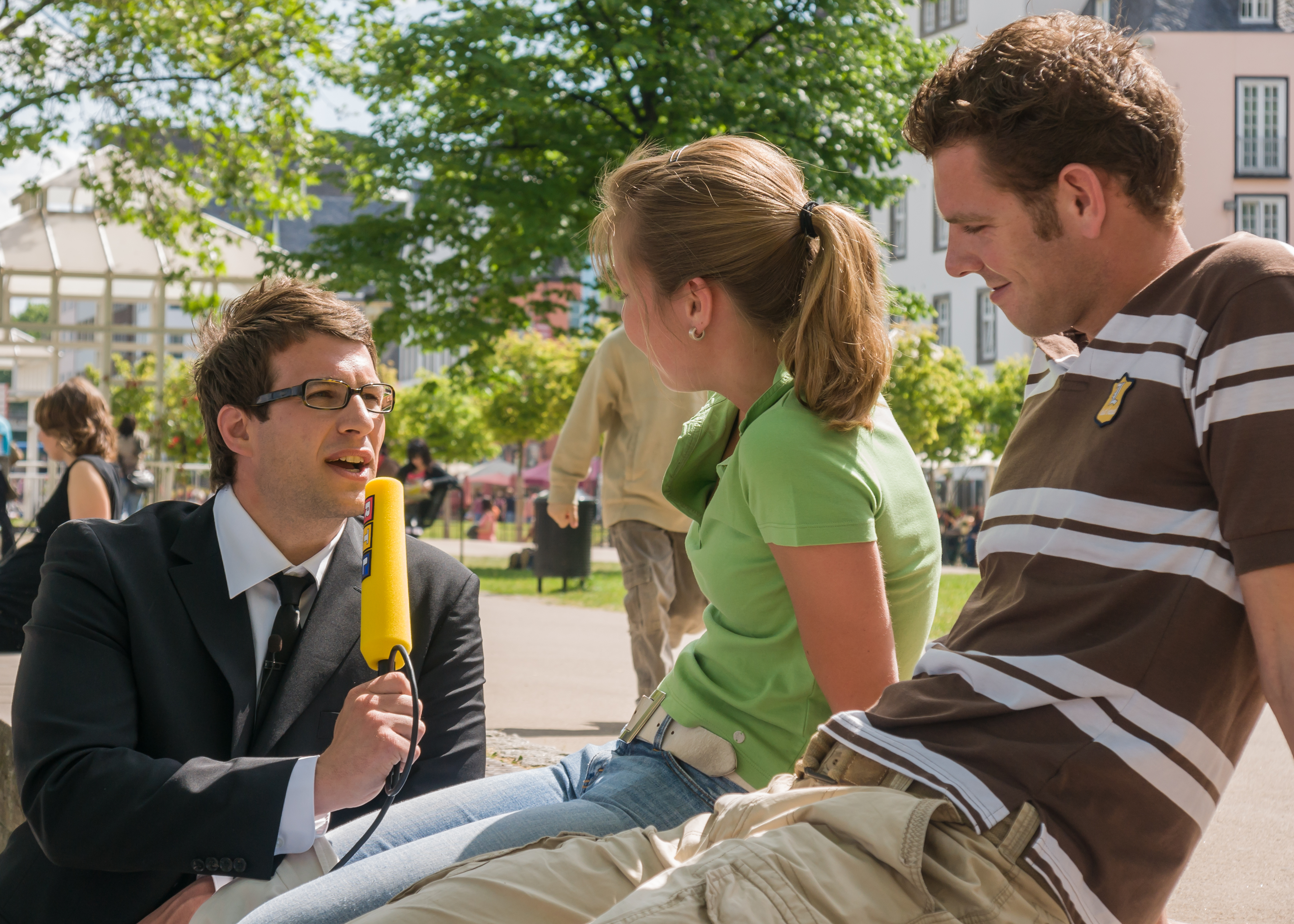
Hartwich interviewing in 2008

In 2008, Hartwich hosted the program Das Supertalent together with Marco Schreyl. In January 2009, RTL sent him to the Australian jungle, where he was the special in the fourth season of Ich bin ein Star – Holt mich hier raus!, hosted by him. In addition, he regularly acts as a reporter for RTL, among other things for the shows Unglaublich! – Die Show der Merkwürdigkeiten and Einspruch – Die Show der Rechtsirrtümer. In 2009, he again hosted Das Supertalent and was awarded the Goldene Kamera in January 2010.

In 2010, Hartwich, together with Nazan Eckes, hosted the third season of Let's Dance. He succeeded Hape Kerkeling. In 2011, he hosted with Sylvie Meis for the first time. This was followed by Hartwichs Hockenheim-Test and the 101 Ways to Leave a Gameshow at RTL before he hosted, for the third time and together with Schreyl, Das Supertalent.

In 2011, he hosted his own comedy game show on RTL, H wie Hartwich, in which Hartwich got into unusual situations and the outcome was predicted by the audience. In the spring of 2012, he hosted with Meis again Let's Dance, for which they were awarded the Bavarian TV Prize. In the summer of 2012, he hosted Total Blackout – Stars im Dunkeln. He presented the jury, along with Thomas Gottschalk and Michelle Hunziker, for Das Supertalent 2012.

In January 2013, Hartwich succeeded Dirk Bach in hosting Ich bin ein Star – Holt mich hier raus!, together with Sonja Zietlow. He also moderated the game show Cash Crash and the German versions of Celebrity Family Feud and All Star Family Fortunes.

== Filmography ==
=== Ongoing ===
- 2008–present: Das Supertalent, RTL
- 2010–present: Let's Dance, RTL, with Nazan Eckes (series 3), Sylvie Meis (series 4–10) and Victoria Swarovski (series 11–)
- 2017–present: Meet the Parents, RTL
- 2017–present: Nachsitzen! – Promis zurück auf die Schulbank, RTL
- 2017–present: Keep it in the Family, RTL
- 2020: I Can See Your Voice, RTL

=== Former/One-time ===
- 2005–2006: TKKG – Der Club der Detektive, ZDF/KiKA
- 2006–2007: D Tech, DMAX
- 2008: Einmal im Leben – 30 Dinge, die ein Mann tun muss, RTL
- 2008: Achtung! Hartwich, RTL
- 2010: 101 Wege aus der härtesten Show der Welt, RTL
- 2009–2011: Einspruch – Die Show der Rechtsirrtümer, RTL
- 2011: H wie Hartwich, RTL
- 2012–2014: Der RTL Comedy Grand Prix, RTL
- 2012: Total Blackout – Stars im Dunkeln, RTL
- 2013: Cash Crash, RTL
- 2013–2014: Celebrity Family Feud and All Star Family Fortunes, RTL
- 2013–2022: Ich bin ein Star – Holt mich hier raus! (with Sonja Zietlow), RTL
- 2014: Deutschland sucht den Superstar, RTL, as a stand in for Nazan Eckes on 26 April 2014
- 2015: Hartwichs 100! Daniel testet die Deutschen, RTL
- 2015: Ich bin ein Star – Lasst mich wieder rein! (with Sonja Zietlow), RTL
- 2015: Stepping Out, RTL
- 2016: Crash Test Promis, RTL
- 2017: It Takes 2 (with Julia Krüger), RTL

== Filmography ==
- 2016: Sing (voice of Buster Moon)

== Awards ==
- 2012: Bayerischer Fernsehpreis for hosting Let's Dance (with Sylvie Meis)
- 2013: Deutscher Comedypreis for hosting Ich bin ein Star – Holt mich hier raus! (with Sonja Zietlow)
- 2014: Krawattenmann des Jahres
- 2015: Romy award in the Show category
- 2015: "Man of the Day" by Express on 19 June
