= Marco Schreyl =

German television and radio host

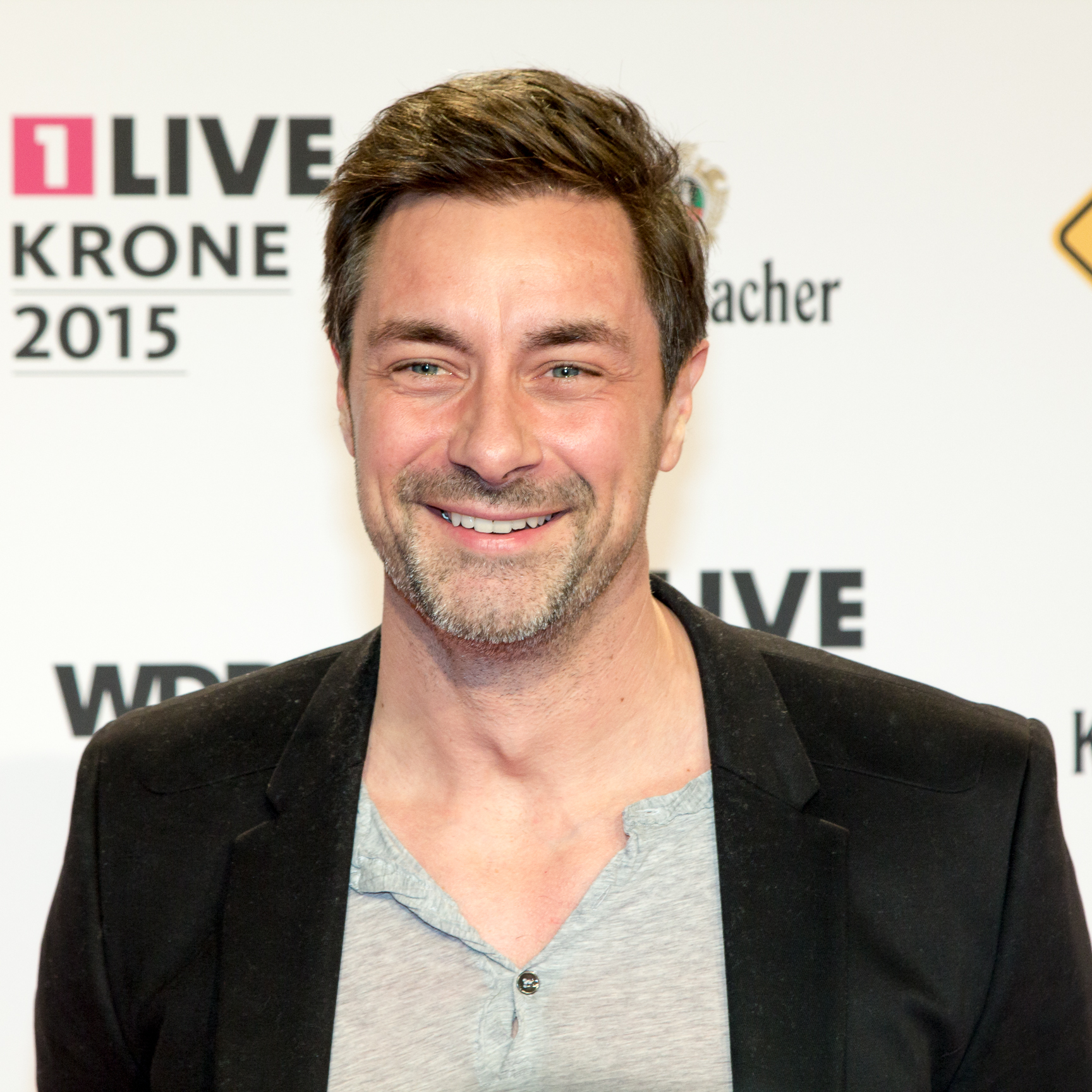
- Schreyl in 2015
- Born: 1 January 1974 (age 52); Erfurt, East Germany
- Years active: 1997–present
- Known for: DSDS host
- Website: marcoschreyl.de

Marco Schreyl (born 1 January 1974) is a German television and radio host.

== Television career ==
In 1997, Schreyl began his television host career at MDR television. On 2 October 2000, he went to ZDF and was the presenter of the television magazine Hallo Deutschland and the quiz show Der große Preis ("The Big Price").

=== RTL ===
Since 2005, Schreyl works for RTL and is the host of the German show Deutschland sucht den Superstar (German version of Pop Idol) and other shows.

He took part on the RTL show Dancing on Ice with professional dancer Sarah Jentgens and placed second.

In 2007, Schreyl hosted the Four Hills Tournament and the fourth season of Deutschland sucht den Superstar on RTL. Furthermore, he presented the Deutscher Fernsehpreis ("German television award").

From 20 October to 3 November 2007, he was the host of the RTL show Das Supertalent (German version of America's Got Talent) and since 20 October 2008 together with Daniel Hartwich.

In 2009, he hosted the World Men's Handball Championship on RTL.

== Radio ==
Until 2000, Schreyl was newscaster on Mitteldeutscher Rundfunk. On 25 February 2008, he returned to radio at hr1 radio station.
