= Sylvie Meis =

Dutch TV personality and model (born 1978)

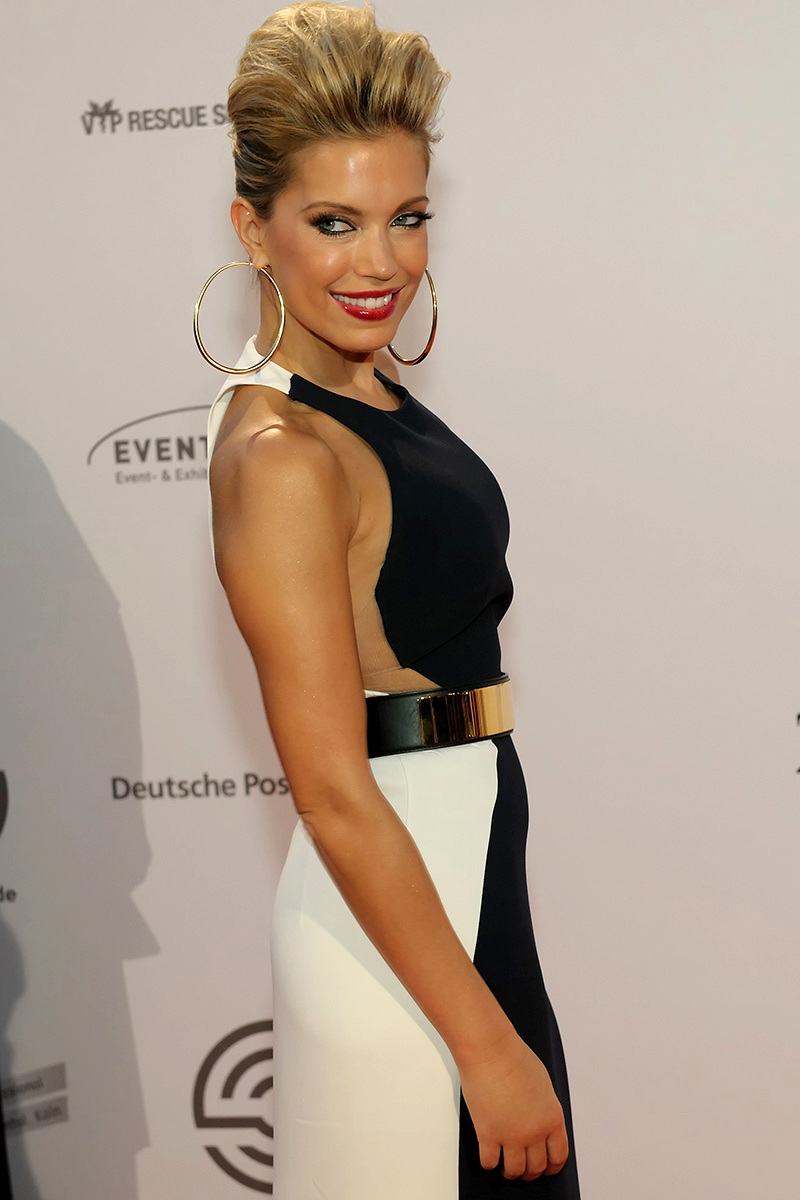
- Meis in 2012
- Born: Sylvie Françoise Meis; 13 April 1978 (age 48); Breda, Netherlands
- Other name: Sylvie van der Vaart
- Years active: 1999–present
- Spouses: Rafael van der Vaart (m. 2005; div. 2013); Niclas Castello (m. 2020; div. 2023)
- Children: 1

Sylvie Françoise Meis (born 13 April 1978), also known as Sylvie van der Vaart, is a Dutch television personality and model based in Germany.

== Career ==
=== Netherlands ===
Born in Breda, Netherlands, Meis is partly of Dutch East Indies origin. She graduated from the University of West Brabant (Dutch: Hogeschool West-Brabant). At the age of 18, she decided that she wanted to become a model and was cast for various shoots by casting agencies. After becoming interested in television, she gained popularity through assignments at FoxKids and music station TMF. She hosts several events at TMF, such as presenting the annual TMF-awards, and conducting interviews with international artists such as Britney Spears and Kylie Minogue. In addition, she is featured in video clips and the Dutch TV series Costa. She also introduced the Pure by Sylvie jewelry line to the Dutch market. She hosted the 2008 FIFA World Player of the Year award ceremony.

After being elected the Netherlands' Sexiest Female in 2003, Meis started a relationship with then Ajax footballer Rafael van der Vaart. Due in part to the fame from their individual careers, they soon became the Netherlands' most famous "football couple". Their fame grew after their marriage on 10 June 2005 and live coverage of the wedding on SBS6, a Dutch television channel, with the broadcast gaining high ratings in the Netherlands; Sylvie took Rafael's last name, van der Vaart.

=== Germany ===
Meis and her then-husband moved to Germany when he left Ajax to play for Bundesliga football club Hamburger SV. After her husband's 2008 transfer to Real Madrid, the van der Vaarts moved to Spain. Between 2008 and 2011, she was a judge on Das Supertalent, the German version of Simon Cowell's Got Talent series. In 2010, she took part in the third season of the German equivalent of Strictly Come Dancing, called Let's Dance. On 17 April 2010, Meis replaced Deutschland sucht den Superstar judge Nina Eichinger for the final of the 7th season, after the latter was stuck in Los Angeles following flight restrictions as a result of the 2010 eruptions of Eyjafjallajökull. Between 2011 and 2017, Meis hosted the show Let's Dance together with Daniel Hartwich. In 2018, she was replaced by former participant Viktoria Swarovski and returned to Das Supertalent as a judge.

Following in the footsteps of entertainers such as Johannes Heesters, Linda de Mol and Rudi Carell, Meis has become a notable Dutch TV personality active in Germany.

== Personal life ==
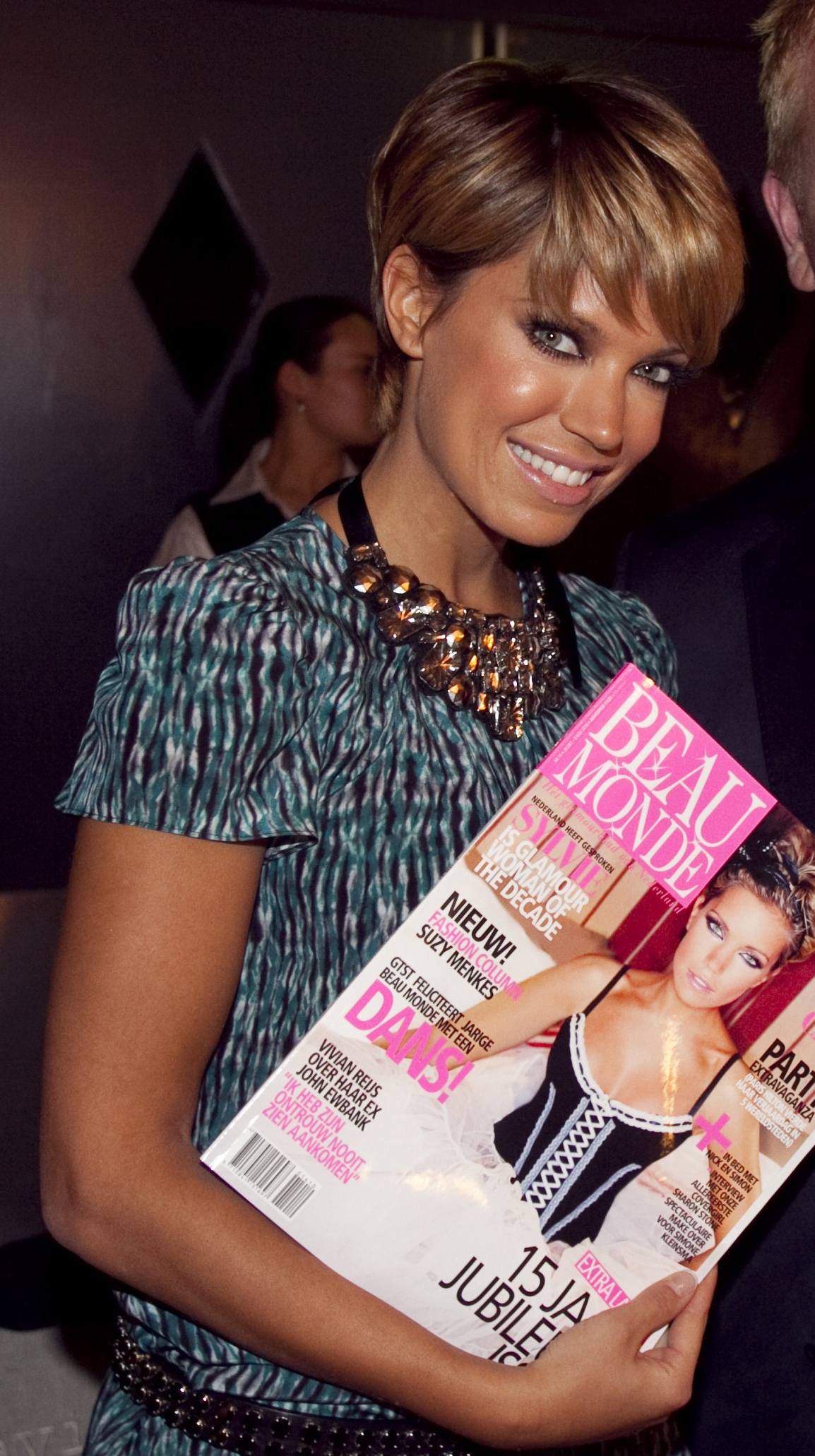
Meis in 2010

Meis is of partly Indo-European descent, with a father of Dutch Indonesian ancestry, and a mother of Belgian ancestry.

Meis began a relationship with footballer Rafael van der Vaart in 2003. On 10 June 2005, the couple married, and on 28 May 2006, their son Damián Rafael was born. Some media described the couple as the "new Beckhams," but both rebuffed the title, saying they prefer to live a normal life. Their son Damián signed for the Ajax youth team in September 2023.

On 16 June 2009, she announced that she had been diagnosed with breast cancer and had undergone surgery in May 2009. She finished post-op chemotherapy and has been cancer-free since. In mid-2009, Real Madrid wanted to trade Rafael van der Vaart, but he decided to stay in Madrid because Sylvie was undergoing cancer treatments there.

In 2010, Meis admitted to having cheated on her husband, stating that van der Vaart found out through emails that she was having an affair with a KLM airline pilot which she believed was the beginning of the end of their marriage. On 2 January 2013, Meis acknowledged their separation after he had struck her in front of others. Their divorce was finalized in December 2013. On 12 April 2017, she became engaged to Charbel Aouad, but the couple separated in October 2017. From 2020 to June 2023, Meis was married to Niclas Castello.

Meis is fluent in English, Dutch, and German.

== Filmography ==
Meis' appearances in movies
Year	Title	Role
2007	UV	Monique

== Television and media appearances ==
Meis has made several television appearances worldwide, including:

- Fox Kids (1999–2002, presenter)
- MTV Netherlands (2003, VJ)
- TMF Nederland (2003–2004, VJ)
- Das Supertalent (2008–2011, 2018, judge)
- Let's Dance (2010, participant)
- Let's Dance (2011–2017, presenter)
- Wedden dat ik het kan (2016, presenter)

== Awards ==
- 2003: The Netherlands' Sexiest Female
- 2011: Media Women of the Year
- 2012: Bayerischer Fernsehpreis (together with Daniel Hartwich)
