= Deutschland sucht den Superstar =

German reality talent show

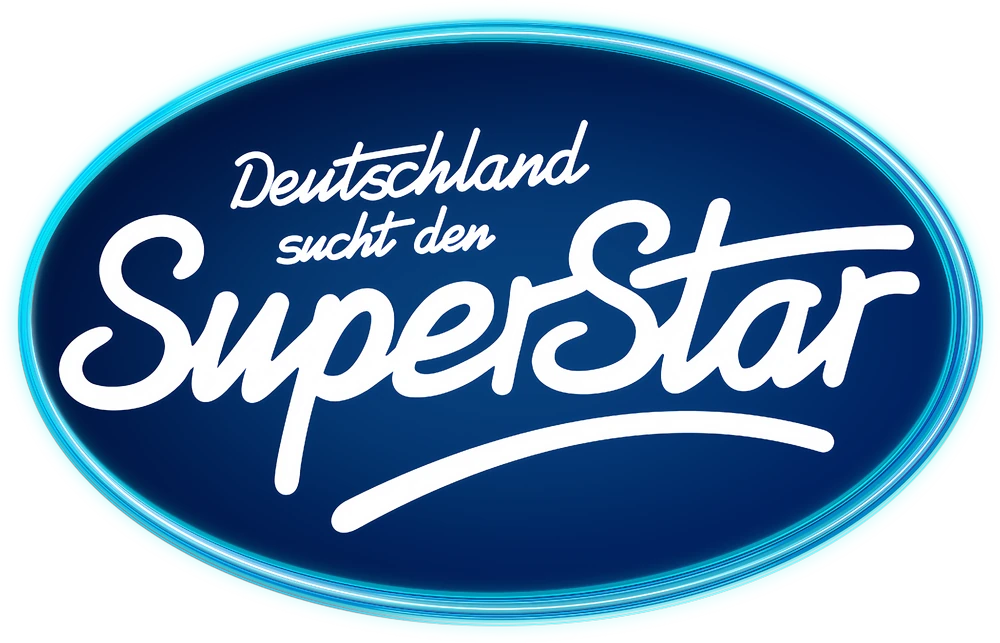
- Created by: Simon Fuller
- Directed by: Bruce Gowers
- Presented by: Current; Laura Wontorra; Former; Michelle Hunziker; Carsten Spengemann; Yvonne Catterfeld; Tooske Ragas; Marco Schreyl; Nazan Eckes; Raúl Richter; Daniel Hartwich; Oliver Geissen; Alexander Klaws
- Judges: Current; Dieter Bohlen; Isi Glück; Bushido; Former; Thomas Bug; Shona Fraser; Thomas M. Stein; Sylvia Kollek; Heinz Henn; Anja Lukasender; Andreas "Bär" Läsker; Nina Eichinger; Max von Thun; Volker Neumüller; Sylvie Meis; Fernanda Brandão; Patrick Nuo; Natalie Horler; Bruce Darnell; Bill Kaulitz; Tom Kaulitz; Mateo Jaschik; Andrea Berg; Kay One; Mieze Katz; Marianne Rosenberg; Mandy Capristo; DJ Antoine; Heino; Michelle; Vanessa Mai; H.P. Baxxter; Shirin David; Ella Endlich; Carolin Niemczyk; Mousse T.; Pietro Lombardi; Oana Nechiti; Xavier Naidoo; Florian Silbereisen; Maite Kelly; Mike Singer; Michael Wendler; Thomas Gottschalk; Ilse DeLange; Toby Gad; Thomas Anders; Sarah Engels; Joachim Llambi; Katja Krasavice; Leony; Loredana; Beatrice Egli
- Country of origin: Germany
- No. of seasons: 22
- No. of episodes: 433

Production
- Executive producers: Nigel Lythgoe; Ken Warwick; Simon Fuller
- Running time: Varies

Original release
- Network: RTL
- Release: 9 November 2002 – present

Deutschland sucht den Superstar (DSDS; "Germany is looking for the Superstar") is a German reality talent show. Part of the Idol franchise, it was created by Simon Fuller as a spin-off from the British show Pop Idol, of which two series were broadcast between the years of 2001 and 2003. Debuting to mediocre ratings in November 2002 on the RTL network, the show has since become one of the most successful shows on German television.

The program aims to discover the best singer in the country through a series of nationwide auditions in which viewer voting determines the winner. Voting is done through phone and SMS text voting.

It was initially announced by RTL in July 2022 that the 20th season would be its last. However, in the first live show of the 20th season, it was announced that there will be a 21st season in 2024.

== Season summaries ==
=== Season 1 ===
The first season 2002–2003 of Deutschland sucht den Superstar debuted without much hype in November 2002 on the RTL network. The show's co-hosts were Swiss actress Michelle Hunziker and former soap opera actor Carsten Spengemann, while the jury consisted of music producer Dieter Bohlen, radio host Thomas Bug, British music journalist Shona Fraser, and then-president of BMG Germany, Thomas M. Stein. Through word of mouth generated by the appeal of its contestants and the presence of Bohlen's acid-tongued commentary, the show grew into a phenomenon ending with a finale viewed by an estimated twelve million viewers in March 2003.

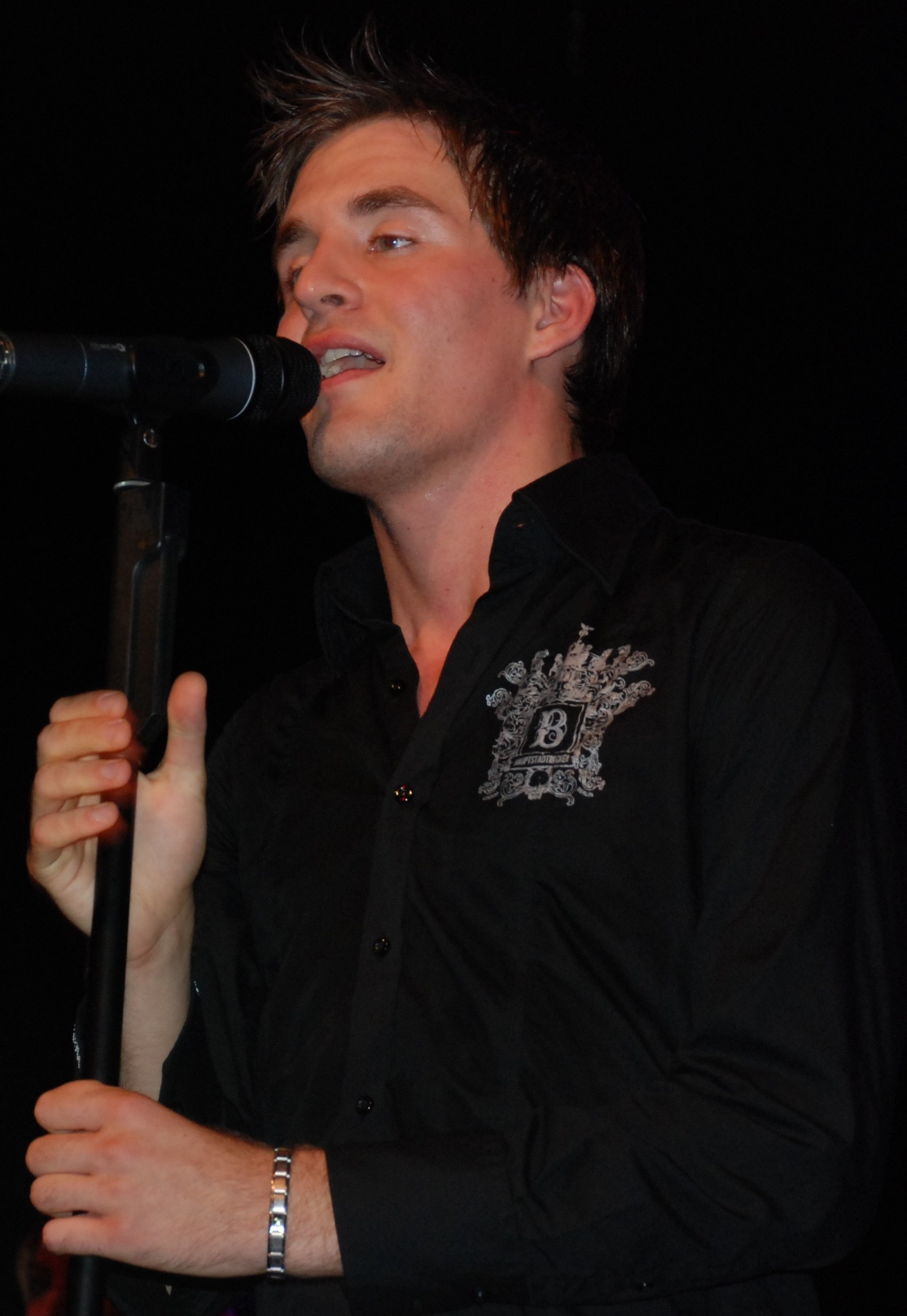
Debut season winner Alexander Klaws in 2008

Winner Alexander Klaws signed a recording contract with BMG, the label in partnership with DSDS. Immediately post-finale, Klaws released three singles, most notably the coronation song "Take Me Tonight" which was written by Bohlen and debuted on top of the German Singles Chart, eventually becoming the second biggest-selling single of 2003 – only losing to "We Have a Dream", the pre-released recording of all ten finalists. Klaws has subsequently had three albums and several hit singles mostly from his more successful first album. While his debut, Take Your Chance (2003), and its follow-up, Here I Am (2004), saw nationwide success and garnered him several ECHO Award nominations, his independent 2006 release, Attention! failed to link on previous sales figures. He has since established a secondary career as an actor on the Sat.1 telenovela Anna und die Liebe and appeared in leading roles on musicals such as Dance of the Vampires and Tarzan.

Besides Klaws, all ten finalists with the exception of then-pregnant Andrea Josten signed record deals with various record companies. Runner-up Juliette Schoppmann also signed with BMG, but in contrast to public expectations she declined working with Bohlen. Instead, she released three singles of which two entered the top ten and a solo album, Unique, which eventually debuted in 2004. Due to moderate sales BMG dropped her shortly after its release. She has since made herself a name as professional songwriter. Third-placed Daniel Küblböck also expanded his nationwide but extremely polarising popularity with a contract with BMG. Until June 2004 he released four major succeeded hit singles and a number-one album, titled Positive Energien (2003). However, further efforts failed on the charts after a controversial participations in the German versions of I'm a Celebrity, Get Me Out of Here! and Big Brother and the release of his flopped motion picture Daniel – Der Zauberer (2004).

Vanessa Struhler became the protégé of hip hop producer DJ Tomekk and saw solid commercial success with her first album, Ride with Me (2003). Gracia Baur also was signed to BMG, but was dropped after her moderate succeeded rock debut Intoxicated (2003). She then signed with Bros Music and was selected to represent Germany in the Eurovision Song Contest 2005 with the song "Run & Hide", where it placed last in a field of 24. Judith Lefeber, Daniel Lopes, and Nektarios Bamiatzis also scored mediocre to little success after the show with their own releases.

=== Season 2 ===
In the second series of DSDS 2003–2004, co-hosts Hunziker and Spengemann and all four jury members reprised their engagements in the show. Following the success of the first installment, the second season was aired to a higher profile during 2003 fall schedule, including an increased number of episodes, budgets and charges for commercial spots. In contrast to the first season, however, the second soon found its main audience but never reached the overwhelming hype and demand which the first season had captured. This fact was underscored by decreasing phone votes and ratings, which were released after the show's final.

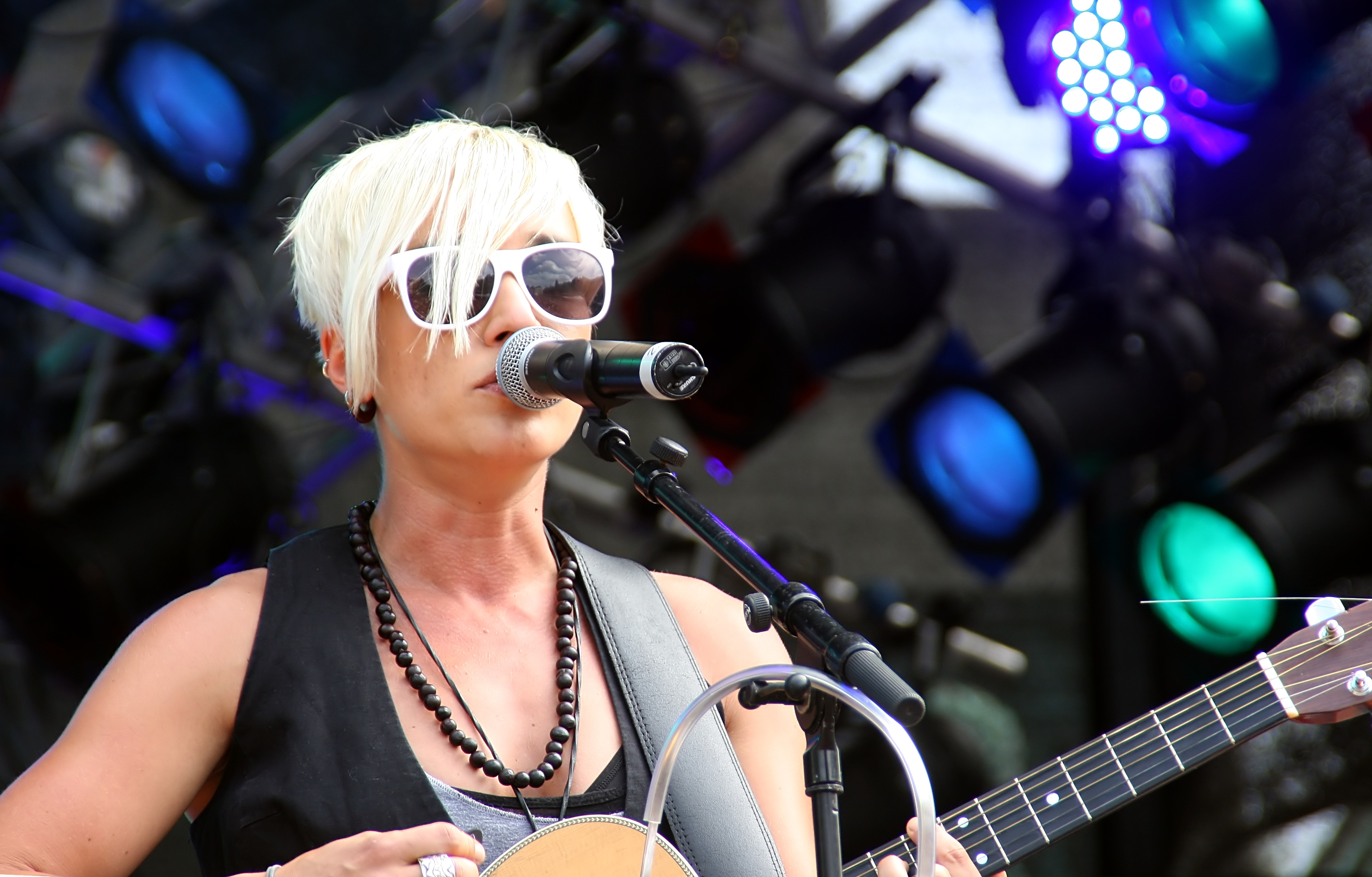
Second season winner Elli Erl in 2009

This time, teacher Elli Erl emerged as the winner. Though Erl agreed to release the Bohlen-produced coronation song "This Is My Life" in a remixed edition, she declined collaborating with him on her debut album In My Dreams due to musical differences. While the debut single still reached the top three of the German Singles Chart, the album, released in October 2004, reached number thirty-three on the German Albums Chart and spawned another two singles of which none became a commercial hit, making Erl the lowest-selling DSDS winner to date. Her following two albums Moving Out (2007) and Human (2009) failed to chart anywhere.

Unlike in season one, the other finalists hit on major problems when they watched out for record deals. While runner-up Denise Tillmanns never signed a recording contract, third-place finisher Philippe Bühler established himself as a professional songwriter and released two R&B-influenced singles, entitled "Warum?" (2005) and "Ich kann dich lieben" (2006), both of which entered the top forty of the German Singles Chart. Anke Wagner signed with independent label Perleberg, but neither her debut single nor her album magaged to enter any chart. Benjamin Martell was signed to BMG, but was dropped when he demanded to write the album by himself. Fifth-place finisher Gunther Göbbel became part of the R&B duo Lemon Ice, whose cover single "Stand by Me" entered the German top twenty in fall 2006. Lorenzo Woodard participated in several prominent reality shows such as Die Alm and Ich bin ein Star – Holt mich hier raus! and has since enjoyed media attention under his transsexual identity "Lorielle London".

=== Season 3 ===
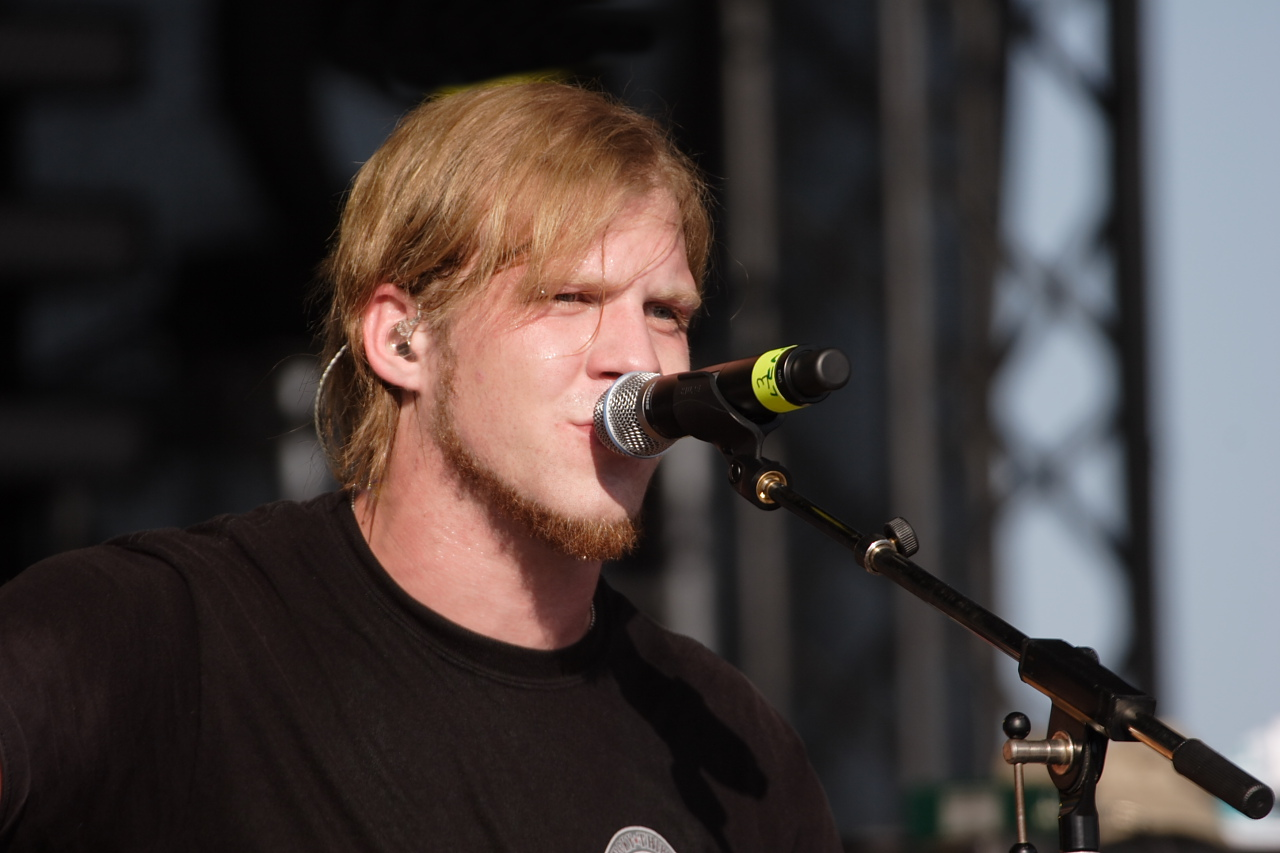
Third season winner Tobias Regner in 2006

After an absence of one year (2004–2005), the third season 2005–2006 introduced several new elements. Neither Hunziker nor Spengemann were asked back as the show's hosts as the studio wanted a new complexion on the season. They were replaced with Marco Schreyl and Dutch co-host Tooske Ragas. The jury cast also went through radical changes; Dieter Bohlen remained the only original member, and was eventually joined by music producer Sylvia Kollek and former manager Heinz Henn.

=== Season 4 ===
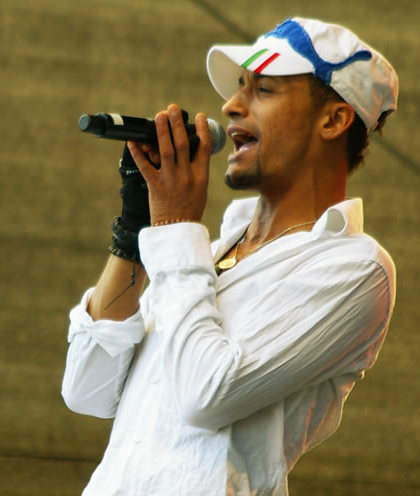
Fourth season winner Mark Medlock

The fourth season of Deutschland sucht den Superstar was aired on German channel RTL from January to May 2007. Mark Medlock, this season's winner, was awarded a contract with Sony BMG. The judges in this season were Dieter Bohlen, Heinz Henn and Anja Lukaseder. It was hosted by Marco Schreyl and Tooske Ragas. The viewers chose the contestant's fates as they were able to call for their favorite contestant. The voting results were published on May 7, 2007.

=== Season 5 ===
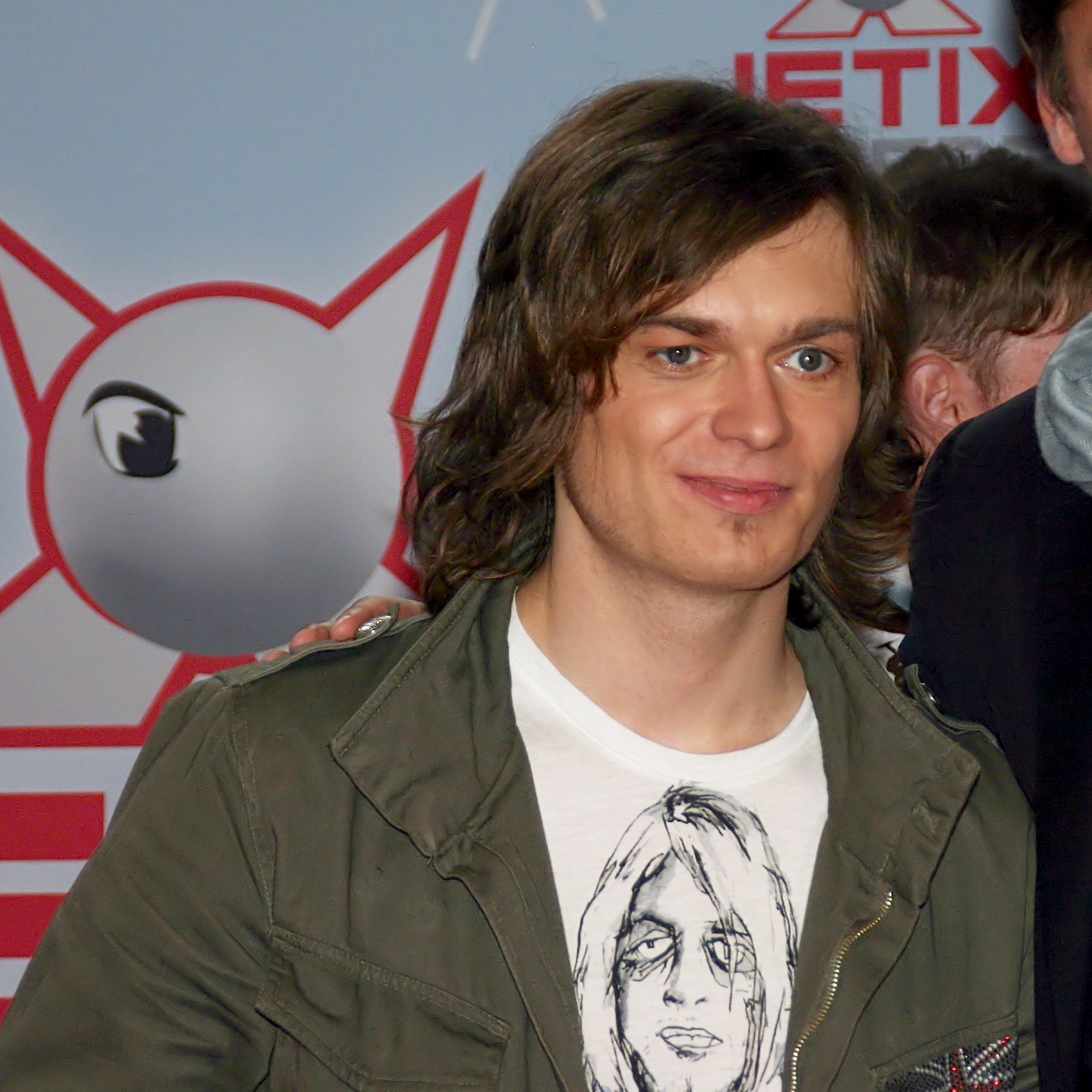
Fifth season winner Thomas Godoj in 2008

Because of the success of season four RTL decided to create a fifth season in 2008. This was announced just before the fourth season final show was shown on TV. There were several changes: Marco Schreyl became the sole host of the show, without the assistance of Tooske Ragas. Due to some arguments with Dieter Bohlen, Heinz Henn was replaced in the jury by Andreas "Bär" Läsker. Läsker discovered and is the manager of Die Fantastischen Vier (The Fantastic Four), and joined existing jury members Bohlen and Anja Lukaseder. The last substantial change concerns only one semi-final shows ("Top 15 shows") with the name Jetzt oder nie (Now or Never): So far the 10 best candidates had been determined by telephone and SMS voting. Instead the jury selected the Top 10 live in front of 1,000 spectators. The five contestants with the highest number of votes from the public went through to the motto shows. The judges picked five more contestants of the remaining 10 to join them. Later, the candidates enter the final shows with public voting as in the earlier series. With the new rules, the producers hope to increase the excitement and to prevent good candidates from being knocked out too early. The auditions started in August on Mallorca and for the first time ever on Ibiza. From September on the casting crew toured throughout Germany. The first show, Now or never – Jetzt oder nie, aired on 8 March 2008.

=== Season 6 ===
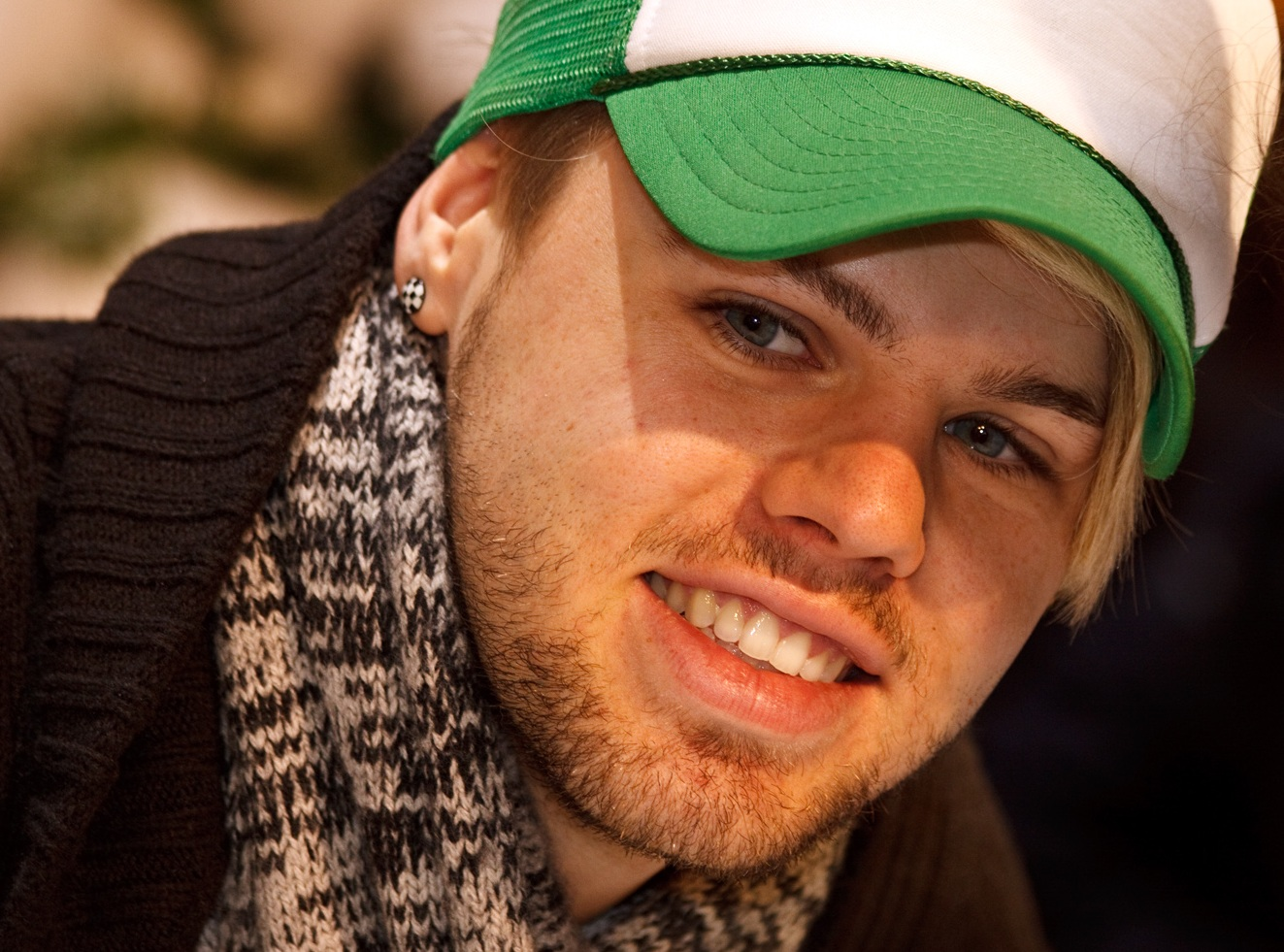
Sixth season winner Daniel Schuhmacher

The sixth season of Deutschland sucht den Superstar was aired on German channel RTL from January to May 2009. The season's winner, Daniel Schuhmacher, was awarded a contract with Sony BMG. The judges in this season were Dieter Bohlen, Nina Eichinger, and Volker Neumüller. It was hosted by Marco Schreyl. The viewers chose the contestant's fates as they were able to call for their favorite contestant. As with season 5, the "Top 10" was created by the Top 5 contestants with the most telephone and SMS voting and the other five were selected by the jury.

=== Season 7 ===
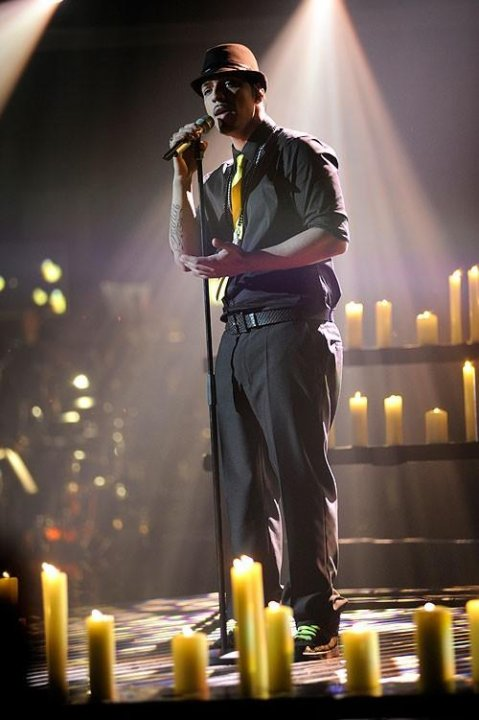
Seventh season winner Mehrzad Marashi in 2010

The seventh season of Deutschland sucht den Superstar was aired on German channel RTL from 6 January to 17 April 2010. The season marked a new national record with more than 35,000 participants. The season's winner was Mehrzad Marashi.

==== Public votes ====
Mehrzad Marahsi won the show. Second was Menowin Fröhlich and on third place Manuel Hoffmann. Menowin has won every liveshow but lost against Mehrzad who won the final with 56.04%. Manuel Hoffmann was eliminated in the 5th show, but he came back after Helmut Orosz was expelled from the show. Manuel came back and reached the semi-final, so that he was the first one who was eliminated and has survived more than one show again. Thomas Karaoglan, who reached the 5th place was known as der Checker and Kim Debkowski has made some advertisement during her video previous her performance with some beauty tips on Kim Gloss Tv.

The live-shows began with the Top-15 show to determine the contestants that would make up the Top 10 in the mottoshows. As done in the previous seasons, the Top 10 were contestants put through from the public vote and the jury's vote. However, 7 (instead of 5) contestants were put through with the public votes and 3 (instead of 5) would be put through by the jury; which ultimately became the contestants that ranked with the next three largest number of votes. In the first live show, Steffi Landerer, who was known for her sex appeal, was eliminated. Marcel Pluschke, who was eliminated on the second live-show, did not perceive an excellent audience respect because of his weak voice and country music roots (which was a first in DSDS). Though criticized for his song selection in the third live show, Nelson Sangaré was surprisingly eliminated after ranking as one of the top contestants throughout the first and second live-shows. After being in the bottom groups every week, Ines Redjeb was eventually eliminated in the fourth live-show. Though proving to be a favorite in the competition despite ranking in the bottom half of the voting, Manuel Hoffmann was eliminated in the fifth show against Helmut Orosz. Orosz, who was a Top 50 contestant in the second season, became criticized for his problems with singing correct texts; immediately after Hoffmann's elimination, the producers of DSDS had found a video of Orosz with a friend using cocaine recently, to which Orosz confessed. Because of this, Orosz was disqualified from the contest and Hoffmann returned to the live-shows surpassing crowd favorite Thomas Karaoglan in the sixth-live show and Kim Debkowski in the seventh live-show. However, Hoffmann's journey ended in the semi-final leaving the finale in the hands of the season's front-runners Menowin Fröhlich and Mehrzad Marashi. Fröhlich, a local DJ, successfully auditioned for the show in the third season making it to the Top-20 live-shows; he later became disqualified due to battery and fraud. Both friends throughout the recall, tensions rose throughout the competition between fans and themselves. After the final vote, Marashi won though only ranking in first place in the Top-15 and the finale as Fröhlich ranked first every week.

=== Season 8 ===
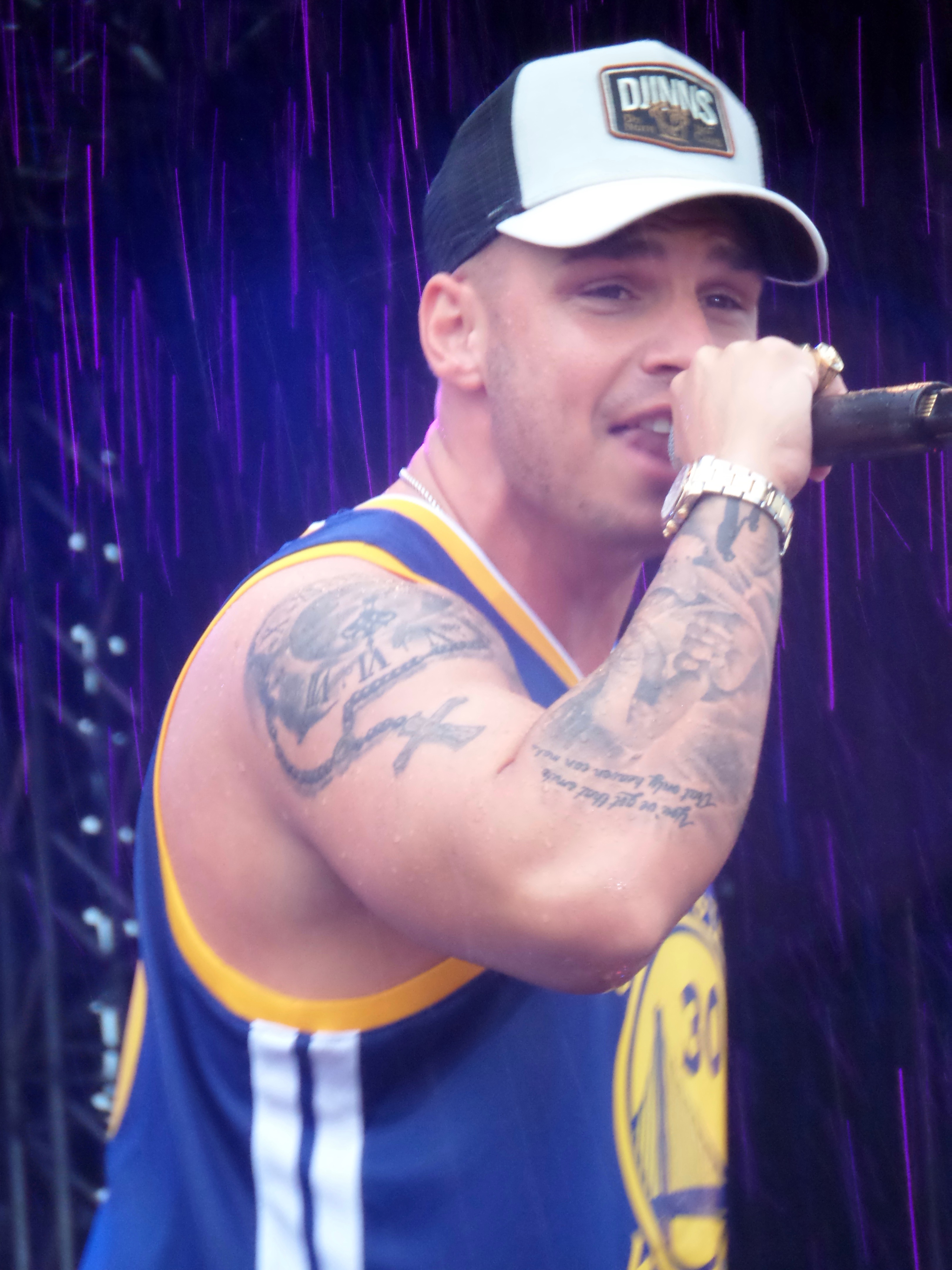
Eighth season winner Pietro Lombardi in 2014

Deutschland sucht den Superstar Season 8 is the eighth season of the Idol series in Germany began airing on RTL on 8 January 2011. The winner will get a recording contract with Universal Music Group. 34,956 people auditioned throughout the 35 cities that hosted auditions. Nina Eichinger and Volker Neumüller were removed from the panel. Their successors are Swiss singer Patrick Nuo and singer/dancer Fernanda Brandão. Marco Schreyl returned as the host. DSDS has extended participation privileges to Austria and Switzerland. The Top 35 will be going to the Maldives. The final aired on 7 May 2011, and the winner was Pietro Lombardi. For the first time there was a prize money of 500,000 euros. This season reintroduced the contestants singing with backing tracks as opposed to a live band.

==== Controversies ====
The Hamburger Morgenpost questioned whether RTL misquoted DSDS Top 10 candidate Anna-Carina Woitschack. In an interview, Anna-Carina was quoted as saying "It was cut together all wrong. I never said that I hate Sarah – but on the contrary, I do not hate Sarah Engels. That is what I said. But it was cut this way by RTL, because it looks good for the show."

RTL received a statement from the Office of Public Safety stating that Sebastian Wurth was not allowed to participate after 10 PM. RTL was also fined 15,000 Euro for the incident.

The Hamburger Morgenpost questioned whether the liveshows were actually live broadcast. In the 3rd Mottoshow, Marco Angelini slipped up in his performance and forgot to sing at the correct time.

Pietro Lombardi's brother posted nude picture of Sarah Engels after she used Pietro's cell phone to talk to girls. The hardcore fans of Pietro Lombardi told his brother Marco about this and he wasn't happy about this. So, he decided to take "revenge." Pietro's brother also wrote "Everyone knows how cheap Sarah Engels is. She is sneaky. A liar."

DSDS host Marco Schreyl mixed up the phone numbers for candidates Zazou Mall and Marco Angelini. A camera shot of Marco Angelini showed him enraged towards the lens. A reporter for the Hamburger Morgenpost, who was present, reported there were chaotic scenes shortly before the end of the recording. Dieter Bohlen mentioned the mistake and Marco Schreyl replied that "It could be made easier for the host". RTL decided that no candidate would be eliminated and the final show was pushed back a week.

On the 6th mottoshow, Sarah Engels had two wardrobe incidents, when dancing to "Walking on Sunshine", where she began dancing too close to one of the cameras, causing two upskirts. This was eventually shown to the studio audience during the recap of her performance and was noted by the judges.

=== Season 9 ===
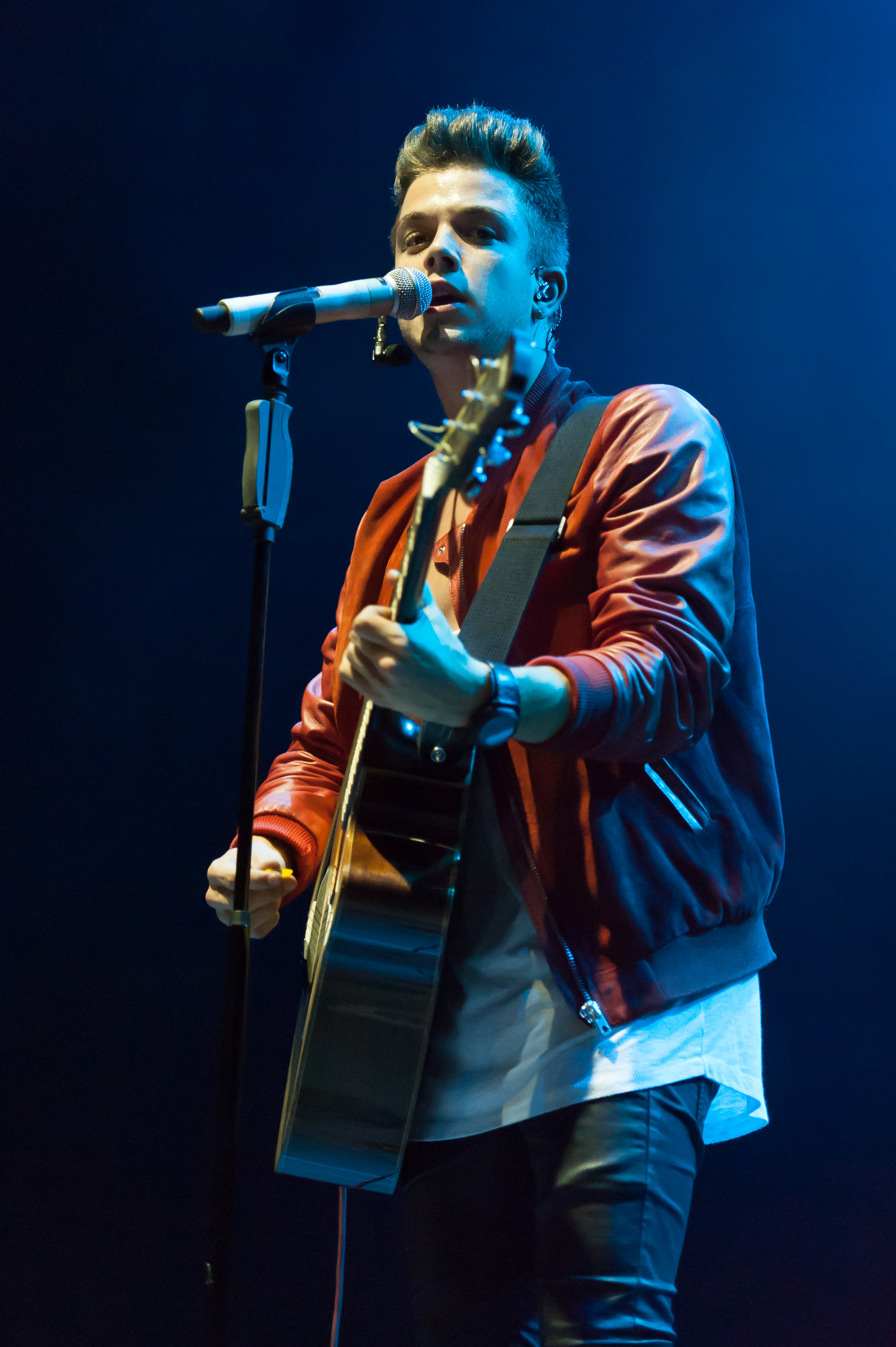
Ninth season winner Luca Hänni

For the ninth season of Deutschland sucht den Superstar, jury members Fernanda Brandão and Patrick Nuo were replaced by Bruce Darnell and Cascada's Natalie Horler. The winner will receive a recording contract with Universal Music Group and €500,000. Participants must be living in Germany, Austria or Switzerland. For the first time, the age limit was relaxed. The auditions stage had 34 audition events in 33 cities across Germany, Austria and Switzerland. 35,401 participants auditioned for season 9. RTL decided to have a "Top 16" instead of a "Top 15". Unlike previous seasons, participants sung in a duet. Luca Hänni won season 9. At age 17, Luca is the youngest winner-to-date.

The Cologne district government wants to enforce a law that protect minors. The law will not allow minors to participate on stage after 10 PM. The issue started last season when this law was enforced for Sebastian Wurth. RTL received a 15,000 Euro fine for the incident. The candidates that this would affect are Daniele Negroni, age 16; Luca Hänni, age 17; Vanessa Krasniqi, age 17 and Fabienne Rothe, age 16. RTL decided to cancel the results show for 7, 14 and 21 April due to the minor protection law.

Hamburger Morgenpost hinted that Thomas Pegram's elimination was expected because of some of his statistics on Facebook. He has the fewest people who clicked the "like" button only 4.105 people and received only 813 comments after the official DSDS Facebook fanpage put up his photo. Hamburger Morgenpost continued this when Silvia Amaru was eliminated restating how the lowest "like" total showed who was going to be eliminated before the final decision. Silvia Amaru's photo had 4.761 "like" while the competition was at around 10.000 on Sunday 11 March at 10:15 CET. Hamburger Morgenpost stated that it should be "clear" for RTL that "Facebook is a power killer" for Deutschland sucht den Superstar. In the Top 8, Kristof had the fews likes for his photo and was not voted out of the show.

Kristof Hering suffered verbal and death threats during his participation during season 9 due to his homosexuality. People were writing stuff like "You are sooo gay to .."; "I'll cut your eggs"; "Get out of DSDS, if you value your life" and "I stab you up". RTL filed charges against unknown persons because of the threats.

TV ratings for season 9 have been disappointing. None of the mottoshows have reached 5 million viewers. season 1 averaged 8.09 million viewers and season 8 averaged 6.32 million viewers in the show's key demographic (ages 14 to 49). Only 4.71 million people watch the final show of season 9. This is the lowest viewership in the history of all the final shows of DSDS. RTL stated they want to continue with the show declining rates.

=== Season 10 ===
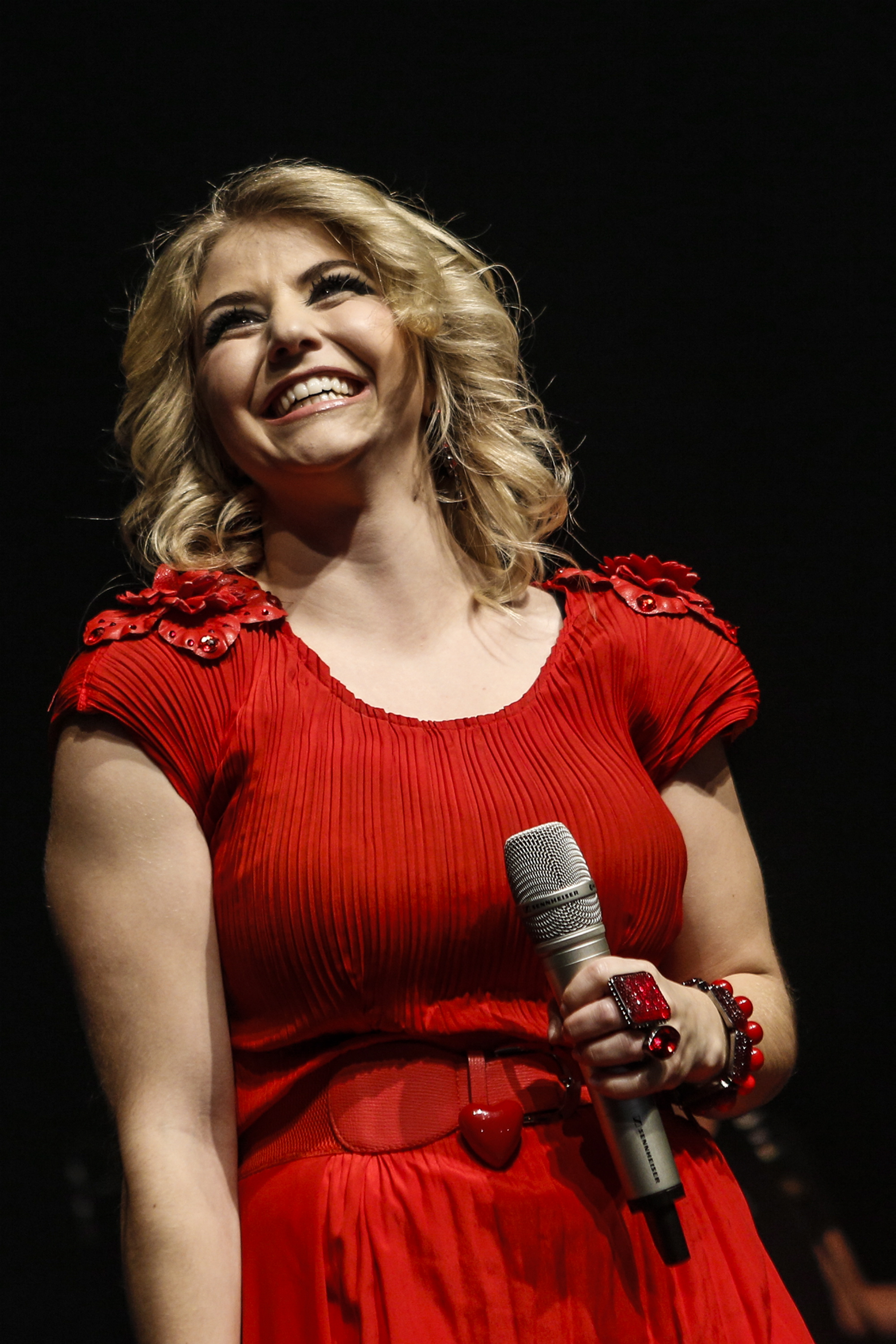
Tenth season winner Beatrice Egli

On 30 April 2012, RTL announced that the show will return for a tenth season, in spite of declining ratings in Season 9. It was also announced that previous judges Natalie Horler and Bruce Darnell as well as host Marco Schreyl will be replaced. Furthermore, a "female quota" will be introduced in order to have an equal balance of male and female contestant. This season returned to the traditional age limit from 16 to 30.

According to reports, the show was supposed to have a live band accompanying the contestants in the live shows, which has been absent since season 8. However, the first motto show of the season did not feature a live band and contestants sounded to be singing to pre-recorded tracks.

On 14 September 2012, RTL announced Tom and Bill Kaulitz from the MTV Video Music Awards winning band Tokio Hotel and Mateo Jaschik founding member of the German dancehall band Culcha Candela as the replacements for Natalie Horler and Bruce Darnell in the jury. This is the first time since season 2 that the jury consisted of four judges.

The first episode attracted 5.18 million viewers, which marks the lowest season premiere rating since season 1, which has not been broadcast on the primetime slot on 8.15pm. Despite this, the show was renewed for an eleventh season for 2014. Only 4.63 million viewers watched the final, a major low record.

The winner of the tenth season was Beatrice Egli. She became the first female winner since season 2 and the first German Schlager singer to win the competition. The season featured a female finale which has happened only twice so far in the history of the show. Furthermore, this is the first time that three women reached the final four.

=== Season 11 ===
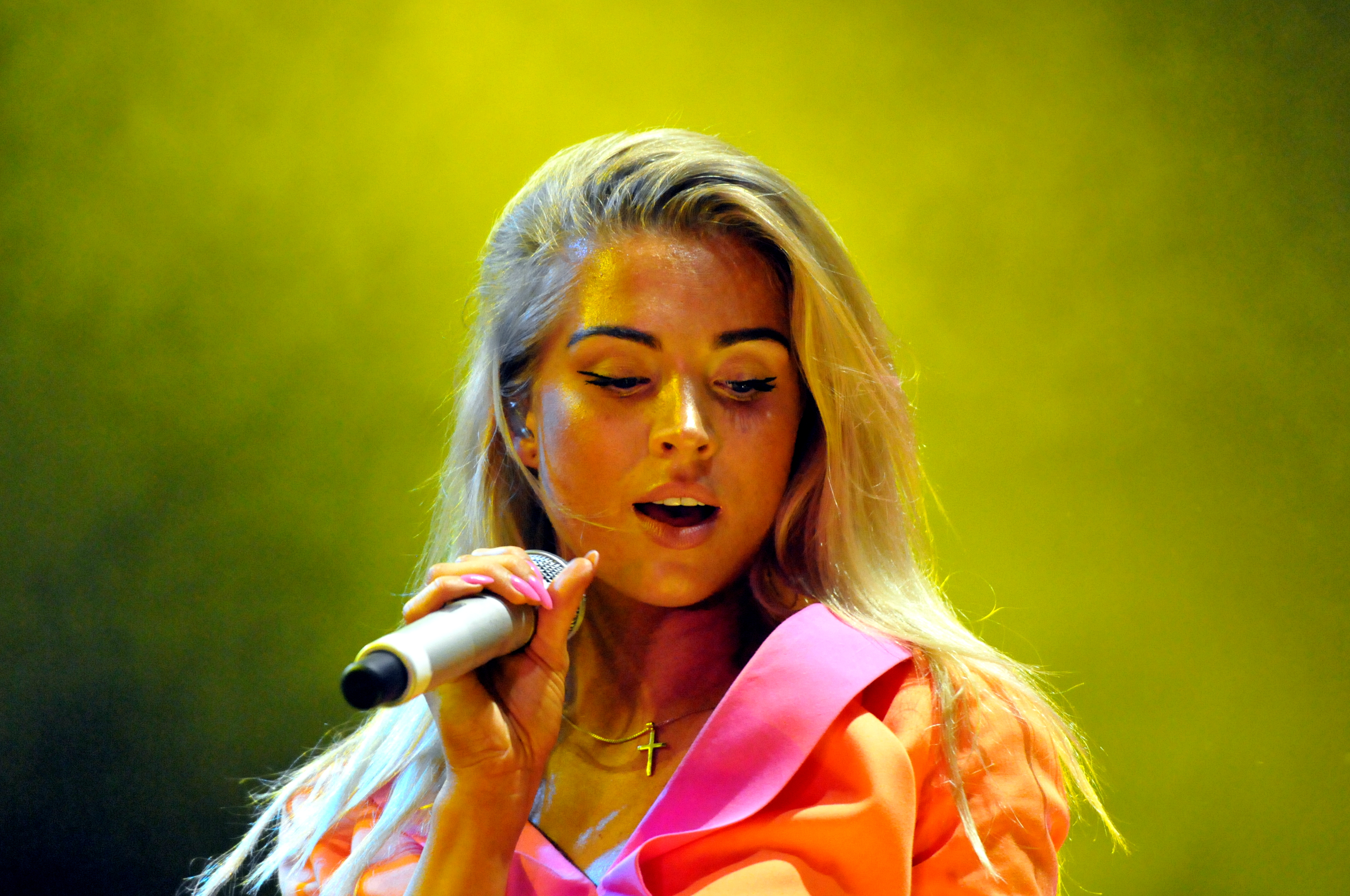
Eleventh season winner Aneta Sablik

On 13 March 2013, RTL announced that there will be an eleventh season. The judges from the previous season, with the exception of Dieter Bohlen, were replaced by rapper Kay One, the singer Mieze Katz of the band MIA., and the Schlager singer Marianne Rosenberg. Nazan Eckes returned as the host of the eleventh season, however without Raúl Richter. The season started on Wednesday, 8 January 2014 on RTL. The season's headline was "Kandidaten an die Macht!" ("Candidates, take over!").

The top 30, which consisted of 15 female and 15 male contestants, were brought to Cuba for the further competition. In the top 20 round, the judges chose the top ten to compete in the live shows. Five of the ten eliminated contestants were given a wild card by the judges and made available for public voting. The two with the highest votes by the viewers will be joining the top 10.

The season premiere attracted 2.7 million viewers, which makes it the least-watched season premiere in the history of Deutschland such den Superstar. However, ratings improved up to 3,33 Mil. viewers by episode three, which makes it the most watched episode of the season so far within the demographics between ages 14–49. Overall, this season showed the lowest ratings in the history of the show.

For the second year in a row this season featured a female final top two and producing a female Superstar for the third time in the history of the show. Aneta Sablik was announced as the winner on 3 May 2014.

=== Season 12 ===
During the live-shows of season 11, it was announced that the castings for season 12 will start in August 2014. RTL's Head of Programm Frank Hoffmann stated in April 2014 that he wants to keep the series for the years the come, although the ratings continued to fall, especially in the live shows. He further explained that the live-shows will be cut to an "absolut minimum". In Fall 2014, RTL gave closer details to the changes of Season 12. The liveshows are replaced with pre-recorded concerts in clubs in Germany, Austria and Switzerland. Only the announcement of the results will be broadcast live. In contrary to the seasons before the final will not take place in a TV studio in Cologne, but in the ÖVB Arena in Bremen.

For the first time, auditions will be held in the Czech Republic, Poland, the Netherlands, Luxembourg and Belgium. Candidates had to be between 16 and 40 years old.

In October 2014, RTL announced that Marianne Rosenberg, Mietze Katz and Kay One won't return for the twelfth season. The new jury consists of Dieter Bohlen, Swiss discjockey DJ Antoine, Schlager singer Heino and singer Mandy Capristo.

The winner of the Deutschland sucht den Superstar 2015 was announced as Severino Seeger with Viviana Grisafi finishing as the runner-up. The winner song entitled Hero of My Heart was produced and written by juror Dieter Bohlen.

=== Season 13 ===
In the first event show of the twelfth season, Oliver Geissen announced that 2016 should be a season for which you should be able to apply for now. In the final, Dieter Bohlen announced that for this season all previous limits such as the age restriction are repealed. Accordingly, the motto of the season is "No Limits". In June 2015, RTL announced that Oliver Geissen will host the Final Shows in 2016 again. On 1 October 2015 RTL announced that next Dieter Bohlen also H.P. Baxxter, Vanessa Mai and Michelle are on the jury. During the auditions, each judge has the option to send a Golden CD a candidate directly in the foreign-Recall. was implemented along the Golden Turd, with the judges can distinguish particularly poor performances. The foreign-Recall took place on Jamaica. It was announced that, like the season before, the live shows are replaced with pre-recorded concerts in clubs in Germany. Only the announcement of the results will be broadcast live. The final will not take place in a TV studio in Cologne, but in the ISS Dome in Düsseldorf.

Prince Damien Ritzinger was the winner of the Deutschland sucht den Superstar 2016 with Laura van den Elzen finishing as the runner-up. The winner song is entitled "Glücksmoment".

=== Season 14 ===
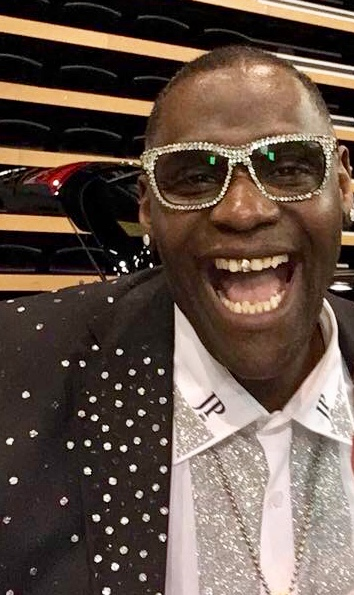
Thirteen season winner Alphonso Williams in 2018

During the live-shows of season 13, it was announced that the castings for season 14 will start in August 2016. The motto was still "No Limits". In Fall 2016, RTL gave closer details to the changes of Season 14. This season's the foreign-Recall was in Dubai and the contestants were performing in the desert, on the helipad of the Burj Al Arab, in front of the world's tallest free-standing-structure, the Burj Khalifa. The pre-recorded concerts in clubs in Germany were replaced by the mottoshows (theme shows) which were used from season 1 to 10.

In 2016, RTL announced that H.P. Baxxter, Michelle and Dieter Bohlen would return, while Vanessa Mai was replaced by YouTuber Shirin David. Oliver Geissen returned as the host of the live shows. This season marked an all-time high because there was a final 14 which was the highest amount of mottoshow contestants ever. Also for the first time, a wild card voting was introduced where the public voted Alphonso Williams who was eliminated just before the mottoshows back in the competition. Alphonso Williams was announced the winner on 6 May followed by Alexander Jahnke, Maria Voskania and Duygu Goenel. With 54 years Williams is the oldest winner to date.

=== Season 15 ===
For Season 15, Dieter Bohlen announced a new jury that consists of Carolin Niemczyk, Ella Endlich and Mousse T. The winner was the 16 years old Marie Wegener. She is the youngest winner ever and only the fourth woman to win the show and the first to win against a male in the top two. Michel Truog was the Runner-Up and Michael Rauscher reached the third Place. This season returned to the traditional age limit from 16 to 30. The prize money was reduced to 100,000 euros.

=== Season 16 ===
For Season 16, RTL and Dieter Bohlen engaged German soul singer Xavier Naidoo, Season 8's winner Pietro Lombardi and professional dancer Oana Nechiti to be a judges on Deutschland sucht den Superstar. 20 year old Davin Herbrüggen was the winner, where Nick Feretti and Joana Kesenci came in second and third pace.

=== Season 17 ===
For the start of Season 17, the judges stayed as they are. The season premiered on 4 January 2020. Xavier Naidoo was subsequently excluded from the jury and replaced by Florian Silbereisen. The winner was Ramon Kaselowsky, Chiara DꞌAmico reached 2nd, Joshua Tappe 3rd and Paulina Wagner the 4th place. For the second time the winner was a singer of german Schlager and the first male to do so. He reached the highest percentage of voting in the show's history.

=== Season 18 ===
The eighteenth season will begin airing on 2021. On 13 August 2020, it was announced that next to the judge Dieter Bohlen will seat Mike Singer and Michael Wendler. On 16 August 2020, it was announced Maite Kelly as the fourth judge. Due to his public belief in conspiracy theories and other statements, Michael Wendler was completely cut out of the show. The season will be the last season with Dieter Bohlen as a judge. Thomas Gottschalk replaced Bohlen in the live shows since he was unable to participate because of an illness. For the first time there were only two live shows and also it was the first top four to just consist of male contestants. This time, the live shows took place at the Landschaftspark Duisburg-Nord. Jan-Marten Block was the winner of the season and Karl Jeroboan came in the second place.

=== Season 19 ===
The 19th season started on 22 January 2022 and was won by Harry Marcello Laffontien while his younger brother Gianni Laffontien finished fourth. This was the first time in the show that two brothers reached a seasons final. The Jury consists of Florian Silbereisen, Toby Gad and Ilse Delange.

=== Season 20 ===
On 14 January 2023, Dieter Bohlen, who should have had his final season as a judge in season 18, returned as a judge, as did Pietro Lombardi. New members were Katja Krasavice and Leony.

This season should have been the last season of the series, but Dieter Bohlen announced that the series will return for a 21st season. The winner was Sem Eisinger.

==== Finalists ====
Place	Contestant	Age	Hometown	Occupation	Status
1	Sem Eisinger	29	Frankfurt	Barkeeper	Winner
2	Monika Gajek	21	Salzgitter	Warehousewoman (trainee)	Runner-up
3	Lorent Berisha	19	Dierikon	Medical practice assistant	Eliminated; Final
4	Kiyan Yousefbeik	25	Hannover	Content manager at TikTok	Eliminated; Final
5	David Leischik	27	Cologne	Music student	Eliminated; Semi-Final
6	Peris Grigoriadis	25	Pleidelsheim	Mechanic and DJ	Eliminated; Semi-Final
7	Aileen Sager	23	Birkenfeld	Medical assistant	Eliminated; Semi-Final
8	Lawa Baban	25	Gießen	Mini-jobber	Eliminated; Semi-Final
9	Natalie Nock	29	Baden-Baden	Real estate clerk	Eliminated; Liveshow 1
10	Rose Ndumba	23	Essen	Student	Eliminated; Liveshow 1

==== Elimination chart ====
Females	Males	Top 10	Winner	Runner-up

Safe	Most votes	Safe Last	Eliminated

Stage:		Top 10	Semi-Final - Top 8	Final - Top 4
Week:		4/1	4/8	4/15
Place	Contestant	Result		
1	Sem Eisinger	1st 36.97%	1st 35.80%	Winner; 54.81%
2	Monika Gajek	3rd 12.24%	2nd 16.18%	Runner-up; 18.52%
3	Lorent Berisha	2nd 18.41%	4th 10.03%	3rd 13.88%
4	Kiyan Yousefbeik	4th 8.29%	3rd 15.65%	4th 12.79%
5	David Leischik	5th 7.98%	5th 8.14%	
6	Peris Grigoriadis	7th 4.09%	6th 6.09%	
7	Aileen Sager	6th 4.15%	7th 4.82%	
8	Lawa Baban	8th 3.10%	8th 3.29%	
9	Natalie Nock	9th 2.45%		
10	Rose Ndumba	10th 2.32%		

=== Season 21 ===
In this season contestants above 30 years can participate to win the title Superstar because there is no more limit of age. The last "No Limits" season was season 14. The jury in this season consisted of Dieter Bohlen, Pietro Lombardi, Beatrice Egli and Loredana. The season premiered on 18 September 2024. That was the first time since season 2 that Deutschland sucht den Superstar begins airing a season in September. From season four to twenty the airdate was always January. The four finalists compete in the only live show this year and for the second time since season 18 all of them being male. The season was won by Christian Jährig who breaks the record of the highest percentage of votes by 4 finalists with 75.61%.

==== Finalists ====
Place	Contestant	Age	Hometown	Occupation	Status
1	Christian Jährig	30	Reichertshofen	Sales team leader	Winner
2	Philip Matas	25	Heidenheim an der Brenz	Financial clerk	Runner-up
3	Nissim Mizrahi	61	Hamburg	Bistro operator	Eliminated; Final
4	Tom Mc Conner	23	Duisburg	Casual worker	Eliminated; Final

==== Elimination chart ====
Males	Top 4	Winner	Runner-up

Eliminated

Stage:		Final - Top 4
Week:		11/9
Place	Contestant	Result
1	Christian Jährig	Winner; 75.61%
2	Philip Matas	Runner-up; 9.92%
3	Nissim Mizrahi	3rd 8.38%
4	Tom Mc Conner	4th 6.09%

=== Season 22 ===
In the 22nd season of Deutschland sucht den Superstar has started on 4th April with the Jury being Dieter Bohlen, Isi Glück and Bushido. This is the first time since season 19 there are only three judges in the panel. It is also the first time in the shows history that Menowin Fröhlich, a former contestant and runner-up of season 7 is allowed to participate. The Final of this season is on 9 May and has the most finalists to date with 5 on of them beeing Menowin Fröhlich. That means he is the first ever contestant to reach a Final of Deutschland sucht den Superstar twice. The season was won by Menowin Fröhlich with 56.52 % of the publicvote. This marks also a novum in the history of the show, that a previous contestant from the Liveshows has won the title.

== Criticisms and controversies ==
The German Cultural Council accused RTL "malicious disregard" for humanity after a 17-year-old had a nervous breakdown during his audition. The Kommission für Jugendmedienschutz opened a review procedure against Deutschland sucht den Superstar and KJM boss Wolf-Dieter Ring stated that "the manner in which contestants are humiliated on the show could have detrimental effects on young viewers."

Elli Erl, the winner of season 2, confirmed that RTL asked for fake stories when she participated in the show. Again, in season 8, RTL created fake stories. RTL misquoted DSDS season 8 candidate Anna-Carina Woitschack. In an interview, Anna-Carina was quoted as saying "It was cut together all wrong. I never said that I hate Sarah – but on the contrary, I do not hate Sarah Engels. That is what I said. But it was cut this way by RTL, because it looks good for the show."

== DSDS Kids ==
On 13 March 2012, RTL announced that there will be a kids edition of DSDS. The ages will be from 4 to 14. The participants will get training scholarship and prize money. Dieter Bohlen, Michelle Hunziker and Dana Schweiger were named to the jury for season 1. There were 38.664 applications for season 1 of the show.

German child protection association president Heinz Hilgers advised parents not to apply for the show. He claimed that the adult version "was based on humiliation and embarrassment". The association's director, Paula Honkanen-Schoberth, stated that "Casting shows are geared towards making one person successful" and also claimed "The message for the rest is, 'you're no good.'" However, RTL stated that this is a family show and it wants to encourage the children.

== Season details ==
Season	Premiere date	Final date	Number of episodes	Winner	Runner-up	Other contestants in order of elimination	Number of contestants
1	9 November 2002	8 March 2003	15	Alexander Klaws	Juliette Schoppmann	Stephanie Brauckmeyer, Andrea Josten, Judith Lefeber, Nektarios Bamiatzis, Daniel Lopes, Nicole Süßmilch, Gracia Baur, Vanessa Struhler, Daniel Küblböck	11
2	3 September 2003	13 March 2004	22	Elli Erl	Denise Tillmanns	Ricky Ord, Jessica Houston, Steffen Frommberger, Lorenzo Woodard, Kemi Awosogba, Judith Burmeister, Aida Ilijasevic, Anke Wagner, Gunther Göbbel, Benjamin Martell, Philippe Bühler	13
3	16 November 2005	18 March 2006	20	Tobias Regner	Mike Leon Grosch	Carolina Escolano, Dascha Semcov, Stephan Darnstaedt, Lena Hanenberg, Daniel Muñoz, Anna-Maria Zimmermann, Didi Knoblauch, Nevio Passaro, Vanessa Jean Dedmon	11
4	10 January 2007	5 May 2007	20	Mark Medlock	Martin Stosch	Laura Martin, Jonathan Enns, Julia Falke, Francisca Urio, Thomas Enns, Lauren Talbot, Max Buskohl, Lisa Bund	10
5	23 January 2008	17 May 2008	20	Thomas Godoj	Fady Maalouf	Jermaine Alford, Sahra Drone, Stella Salato, Collins Owusu, Benjamin Herd, Rania Zeriri, Monika Ivkic, Linda Teodosiu	10
6	21 January 2009	9 May 2009	20	Daniel Schuhmacher	Sarah Kreuz	Michelle Bowers, Cornelia Patzlsperger, Marc Jentzen, Holger Göpfert, Vanessa Neigert, Benny Kieckhäben, Dominik Büchele, Annemarie Eilfeld	10
7	6 January 2010	17 April 2010	20	Mehrzad Marashi	Menowin Fröhlich	Steffi Landerer, Marcel Pluschke, Nelson Sangaré, Ines Redjeb, Helmut Orosz, Thomas Karaoglan, Kim Debkowski, Manuel Hoffmann	10
8	8 January 2011	7 May 2011	23	Pietro Lombardi	Sarah Engels	Marvin Cybulski, Nina Richel, Anna-Carina Woitschack, Norman Langen, Zazou Mall, Sebastian Wurth, Marco Angelini, Ardian Bujupi	10
9	7 January 2012	28 April 2012	24	Luca Hänni	Daniele Negroni	Thomas Pegram, Silvia Amaru, Vanessa Krasniqi, Hamed Anousheh, Kristof Hering, Joey Heindle, Fabienne Rothe, Jesse Ritch	10
10	5 January 2013	11 May 2013	23	Beatrice Egli	Lisa Wohlgemuth	Nora Ferjani, Maurice Glover, Timo Tiggeler, Simone Mangiapane, Tim David Weller, Erwin Kintop, Susan Albers, Ricardo Bielecki	10
11	8 January 2014	3 May 2014	19	Aneta Sablik	Meltem Acikgöz	Sophia Akkara, Larissa Joyce Melody Haase, Alessandro Di Lella, Vanessa Valera-Rojas, Enrico von Krawczynski, Elif Batman, Christopher Schnell, Yasemin Kocak, Richard Schlögl, Daniel Ceylan	12
12	7 January 2015	16 May 2015	20	Severino Seeger	Viviana Grisafi	Leon Heidrich, Marcel Kärcher, Robin Eichinger, Laura Lopez, Seraphina Ueberholz, Erica Greenfield, Jeannine Rossi, Antonio Gerardi	10
13	2 January 2016	7 May 2016	21	Prince Damien	Laura van den Elzen	Aytug Gün, Ramona Mihajilovic, Tobias Soltau, Sandra Berger, Mark Hoffmann, Igor Barbosa, Anita Wiegand, Thomas Katrozan	10
14	4 January 2017	6 May 2017	22	Alphonso Williams	Alexander Jahnke	Matthias Bonrath, Angelika Ewa Turo, Mihaela Cataj, Armando Sarowny, Ruben Mateo, Ivanildo Kembel, Monique Simon, Sandro Brehorst, Chanelle Wyrsch, Noah Schärer, Duygu Goenel, Maria Voskania	14
15	3 January 2018	5 May 2018	19	Marie Wegener	Michel Truog	Emilija Mihailova, Isa Martino, Mario Turtak, Giulio Arancio, Mia Gucek, Lukas Otte, Janina El Arguioui, Michael Rauscher	10
16	5 January 2019	27 April 2019	21	Davin Herbrüggen	Nick Ferretti	Angelina Mazzamurro, Lukas Kepser, Jonas Weisser, Momo Chahine, Clarissa Schöppe, Taylor Luc Jacobs, Alicia Awa Beissert, Joana Kesenci	10
17	4 January 2020	4 April 2020	22	Ramon Roselly	Chiara D'Amico	Ricardo Rodrigues, Marcio Pereira Conrado, Lydia Kelovitz, Paulina Wagner, Joshua Tappe	7
18	5 January 2021	3 April 2021	19	Jan-Marten Block	Karl Jeroboan	Daniel "Ludi" Ludwig, Daniele Puccia, Jan Böckmann, Michelle Patz, Pia-Sophie Remmel, Starian Dwayne McCoy, Kevin Jenewein	9
19	22 January 2022	7 May 2022	18	Harry Laffontien	Amber van den Elzen	Domenico Tarantino, Abi Nova Campos, Tina Umbricht, Din Omerhodzic, Melissa Turan, Dominik Simmen, Gianni Laffontien, Melissa Mantzoukis	10
20	14 January 2023	15 April 2023	20	Sem Eisinger	Monika Gajek	Natalie Nock, Rose Ndumba, Aileen Sager, Lawa Baban, Peris Achilleas Grigoriadis, David Leischik, Kiyan Sepehr Yousefbeik, Lorent Berisha	10
21	18 September 2024	9 November 2024	15	Christian Jährig	Philip Matas	Tom Mc Conner, Nissim Mizrahi	4
22	4 April 2026	9 May 2026	10	Menowin Fröhlich	Constance Dizendorf	Noemi Stefaniak, Peter Heimerdinger, Valentina Wagner, Kadischa Weiß, Alexander "Lex" Spielhaupter, Maric Verch, Abdul "Abii" Faizan, Paco Lazar Simic, Tyrell Hagedorn	11

== Formats ==
Season	Round 1	Round 2	Round 3	Round 4	Round 5
1	Auditions	Recalls	Top 30	Top 11	Final 2
2	Auditions	Recalls	Top 50	Top 13	Final 2
3	Auditions	Recalls	Top 20 (Boys); Top 20 (Girls)	Top 11	Final 2
4	Auditions	Recalls	Top 20 (Boys); Top 20 (Girls)	Top 10	Final 2
5	Auditions	Recalls	Top 15	Top 10	Final 2
6	Auditions	Recalls	Top 15	Top 10	Final 2
7	Auditions	Recalls	Top 15	Top 10	Final 2
8	Auditions	Recalls	Top 15	Top 10	Final 2
9	Auditions	Recalls	Top 16	Top 10	Final 2
10	Auditions	Recalls	Top 10	Final 2	
11	Auditions	Recalls	Top 12	Final 3	
12	Auditions	Recalls	Top 10 (Event Shows)	Final 3	
13	Auditions	Recalls	Top 10 (Event Shows)	Final 3	
14	Auditions	Recalls	Top 14	Final 4	
15	Auditions	Recalls	Top 10	Final 4	
16	Auditions	Recalls	Top 10	Final 4	
17	Auditions	Recalls	Top 7	Final 4	
18	Auditions	Recalls	Top 9	Final 4	
19	Auditions	Recalls	Top 10	Final 4	
20	Auditions	Recalls	Top 10	Final 4	
21	Auditions	Recalls	Final 4		
22	Auditions	Recalls	Top 11	Final 5	

== Judges and hosts ==
=== Judges ===
==== DSDS ====
Seasons	Judges			
1	Dieter Bohlen^{6}	Thomas Bug	Shona Fraser	Thomas M. Stein
2	Dieter Bohlen^{6}	Thomas Bug	Shona Fraser	Thomas M. Stein
3	Dieter Bohlen^{6}	Sylvia Kollek	Heinz Henn	
4	Dieter Bohlen^{6}	Anja Lukaseder	Heinz Henn	
5	Dieter Bohlen^{6}	Anja Lukaseder	Andreas "Bär" Läsker	
6	Dieter Bohlen^{6}	Nina Eichinger^{2}	Volker Neumüller^{1}	
7	Dieter Bohlen^{6}	Nina Eichinger^{2}	Volker Neumüller^{1}	
8	Dieter Bohlen^{6}	Fernanda Brandão	Patrick Nuo	
9	Dieter Bohlen^{6}	Natalie Horler	Bruce Darnell	
10^{3}	Dieter Bohlen^{6}	Bill Kaulitz	Tom Kaulitz	Mateo Jaschik
11	Dieter Bohlen^{6}	Kay One	Mieze Katz	Marianne Rosenberg
12	Dieter Bohlen^{6}	Mandy Capristo	DJ Antoine	Heino
13	Dieter Bohlen^{6}	Michelle	Vanessa Mai	H.P. Baxxter
14	Dieter Bohlen^{6}	Michelle	Shirin David	H.P. Baxxter
15	Dieter Bohlen^{6}	Ella Endlich	Carolin Niemczyk	Mousse T.
16	Dieter Bohlen^{6}	Pietro Lombardi	Oana Nechiti	Xavier Naidoo^{4}
17	Dieter Bohlen^{6}	Pietro Lombardi	Oana Nechiti	Xavier Naidoo^{4}
18^{5}	Dieter Bohlen^{6}	Maite Kelly	Mike Singer	
19^{7}	Florian Silbereisen	Ilse DeLange	Toby Gad	
20	Dieter Bohlen	Pietro Lombardi	Katja Krasavice	Leony
21	Dieter Bohlen	Pietro Lombardi	Loredana	Beatrice Egli
22	Dieter Bohlen	Isi Glück	Bushido	

Annotations

- ^{1} Max von Thun was replaced by Volker Neumüller during the auditions of season 6.
- ^{2} Sylvie Meis stepped in for Nina Eichinger in the final of season 7.
- ^{3} Andrea Berg was a guest judge on the seventh "Mottoshow" of season 10.
- ^{4} Florian Silbereisen replaced Xavier Naidoo from the second "Liveshow" until the final of season 17.
- ^{5} After the filming the auditions of the 18th season, Michael Wendler decided to leave the jury.
- ^{6} Thomas Gottschalk replaced Dieter Bohlen in the "Liveshows" of season 18.
- ^{7} There were different guest judges on the season 19 "Liveshows": Thomas Anders on the first show, Sarah Engels on the second show, and Joachim Llambi in the semi-final and final.

==== DSDS Kids ====
Season	Judges		
1	Dana Schweiger	Dieter Bohlen	Michelle Hunziker

=== Presenters ===
==== DSDS ====
Seasons	Presenters	
1	Michelle Hunziker^{1}	Carsten Spengemann
2	Michelle Hunziker^{1}	Carsten Spengemann
3	Tooske Ragas	Marco Schreyl
4	Tooske Ragas	Marco Schreyl
5	Marco Schreyl	
6	Marco Schreyl	
7	Marco Schreyl	
8	Marco Schreyl	
9	Marco Schreyl	
10	Nazan Eckes^{2}	Raúl Richter
11	Nazan Eckes^{2}	
12	Oliver Geissen	
13	Oliver Geissen	
14	Oliver Geissen	
15	Oliver Geissen	
16	Oliver Geissen	
17	Alexander Klaws	
18	Oliver Geissen	
19	Marco Schreyl	
20	Laura Wontorra	
21	Laura Wontorra	
22	Laura Wontorra	

Annotations

- ^{1} Yvonne Catterfeld stepped in for Michelle Hunziker in the third "Top-50-Show" of season 2.
- ^{2} Daniel Hartwich stepped in for Nazan Eckes in the semi-final of season 11.

==== DSDS Kids ====
Season	Presenter
1	Daniel Aßmann
