= Deutschland sucht den Superstar season 16 =

Deutschland sucht den Superstar
- Season 16
- Hosted by: Oliver Geissen
- Judges: Dieter Bohlen; Oana Nechiti; Xavier Naidoo; Pietro Lombardi
- Winner: Davin Herbrüggen
- Runner-up: Nick Ferretti

Release
- Original network: RTL
- Original release: 5 January – 27 April 2019

Season chronology
- ← Previous; Season 15 Next → Season 17

The sixteenth season of Deutschland sucht den Superstar began on 5 January 2019 in RTL. Dieter Bohlen returned for his sixteenth series as a judge, while Oana Nechiti, Xavier Naidoo and Pietro Lombardi are the new judges. Oliver Geissen returned for his fifth series as host. The winner was the 20-year-old Davin Herbrüggen.

== Finalists ==
Place	Contestant	Age	Hometown	Occupation	Status
1	Davin Herbrüggen	20	Oberhausen	Personal Care Assistant	Winner
2	Nick Ferretti	29	Palma, Spain	Musician	Runner-up
3	Joana Kesenci	17	Gronau	Student	Eliminated in Round 2 Final Mottoshow
4	Alicia-Awa Beissert	21	Bochum	Student	Eliminated in Round 1 Final Mottoshow
5	Taylor Luc Jacobs	23	Kiel	Musician	Eliminated; Mottoshow 3
6	Clarissa Schöppe	19	Buckow	Student	Eliminated; Mottoshow 3
7	Momo Chahine	22	Herne	Apprenticeship	Eliminated; Mottoshow 2
8	Jonas Weisser	18	Villingendorf	Student	Eliminated; Mottoshow 2
9	Lukas Kepser	24	Kranenburg	Student	Eliminated; Mottoshow 1
10	Angelina Mazzamurro	21	Erwitte	Hairdresser	Eliminated; Mottoshow 1

== "Mottoshows" ==
Color key

Contestant received the fewest votes and was eliminated
Contestant was in the bottom three
Contestant received the most votes from the public
Contestant was announced as the season's winner
Contestant was announced as the runner-up

=== Top 10 - "Chartbreaker" ===
Original airdate: 6 April 2019

Order	Contestant	Song	Result	Voting result
1	Davin Herbrüggen	"It's My Life"	Safe	9.14% (6/10)
2	Joana Kesenci	"Wrecking Ball"	Safe	16.77% (2/10)
3	Lukas Kepser	"Happier"	Eliminated	5.31% (9/10)
4	Nick Ferretti	"Thinking Out Loud"	Safe	18.99% (1/10)
5	Alicia-Awa Beissert	"Crazy in Love"	Safe	6.47% (7/10)
6	Jonas Weisser	"80 Millionen"	Safe	9.22% (5/10)
7	Angelina Mazzamurro	"Your Song"	Eliminated	4.98% (10/10)
8	Momo Chahine	"Mein Stern"	Bottom three	6.15% (8/10)
9	Clarissa Schöppe	"Shake It Off"	Safe	10.78% (4/10)
10	Taylor Luc Jacobs	"Halt mich"	Safe	12.19% (3/10)

=== Top 8 - "Retro-Hits" ===
Original airdate: 13 April 2019

Order	Contestant	Song	Result	Voting result
1	Jonas Weisser	"Relight My Fire"	Eliminated	6.39% (8/8)
2	Clarissa Schöppe	"Jolene"	Bottom three	9.21% (6/8)
3	Momo Chahine	"Fresh"	Eliminated	6.87% (7/8)
4	Alicia-Awa Beissert	"It's Raining Men"	Safe	10.30% (5/8)
5	Taylor Luc Jacobs	"Freiheit"	Safe	13.02% (4/8)
6	Joana Kesenci	"Wannabe"	Safe	18.41% (2/8)
7	Davin Herbrüggen	"Summer of '69"	Safe	15.09% (3/8)
8	Nick Ferretti	"Dancing in the Dark"	Safe	20.71% (1/8)

=== Top 6 - Semi-Final: "Magischen Moment" (Magic Moment) ===
Original airdate: 20 April 2019

Order	Contestant	Song	Result	Voting result
1	Alicia-Awa Beissert	"Dream a Little Dream of Me"	Bottom three	10.81% (4/6)
2	Nick Ferretti	"Make You Feel My Love"	Safe	29.00% (1/6)
3	Taylor Luc Jacobs	"Starlight Express"	Eliminated	9.60% (5/6)
4	Clarissa Schöppe	"Colors of the Wind"	Eliminated	8.83% (6/6)
5	Davin Herbrüggen	"A Kind of Magic"	Safe	21.94% (2/6)
6	Joana Kesenci	"Endlich sehe ich das Licht"	Safe	19.82% (3/6)
Duette (Duets)
7	Joana Kesenci & Nick Ferretti	"Shallow"	—N/a	
8	Clarissa Schöppe & Taylor Luc Jacobs	"Ein Traum wird wahr"	—N/a	
9	Alicia-Awa Beissert & Davin Herbrüggen	"Beauty and the Beast"	—N/a	

=== Top 4 - Finale (Solo song & Winner's single) ===
Original airdate: 27 April 2019

Order	Contestant	Solo Song	Winner's single	Result	Voting result
1	Alicia-Awa Beissert	"Girl on Fire"	"Good Things"	Eliminated in Round 1	7.74% (4/4)
2	Nick Ferretti	"Hallelujah"	"Anyone Else"	Runner-up	29.46% (2/4)
3	Joana Kesenci	"Sweet but Psycho"	"Like a Fool"	Eliminated in Round 2	18.77% (3/4)
4	Davin Herbrüggen	"(Everything I Do) I Do It for You"	"The River"	Winner	44.03% (1/4)

== Elimination chart ==
Females	Males	Top 10	Winner

Safe	Most votes	Safe Last	Eliminated

Stage:		Finals			
Week:		4/6	4/13	4/20	4/27
Place	Contestant	Result			
1	Davin Herbrüggen	6th 9.14%	3rd 15.09%	2nd 21.94%	Winner; 44.03%
2	Nick Ferretti	1st 18.99%	1st 20.71%	1st 29.00%	Runner-Up; 29.46%
3	Joana Kesenci	2nd 16.77%	2nd 18.41%	3rd 19.82%	3rd 18.77%
4	Alicia-Awa Beissert	7th 6.47%	5th 10.30%	4th 10.81%	4th 7.74%
5	Taylor Luc Jacobs	3rd 12.19%	4th 13.02%	5th 9.60%	
6	Clarissa Schöppe	4th 10.78%	6th 9.21%	6th 8.83%	
7	Momo Chahine	8th 6.15%	7th 6.87%		
8	Jonas Weisser	5th 9.22%	8th 6.39%		
9	Lukas Kepser	9th 5.31%			
10	Angelina Mazzamurro	10th 4.98%			
