= Volker Neumüller =

German music manager

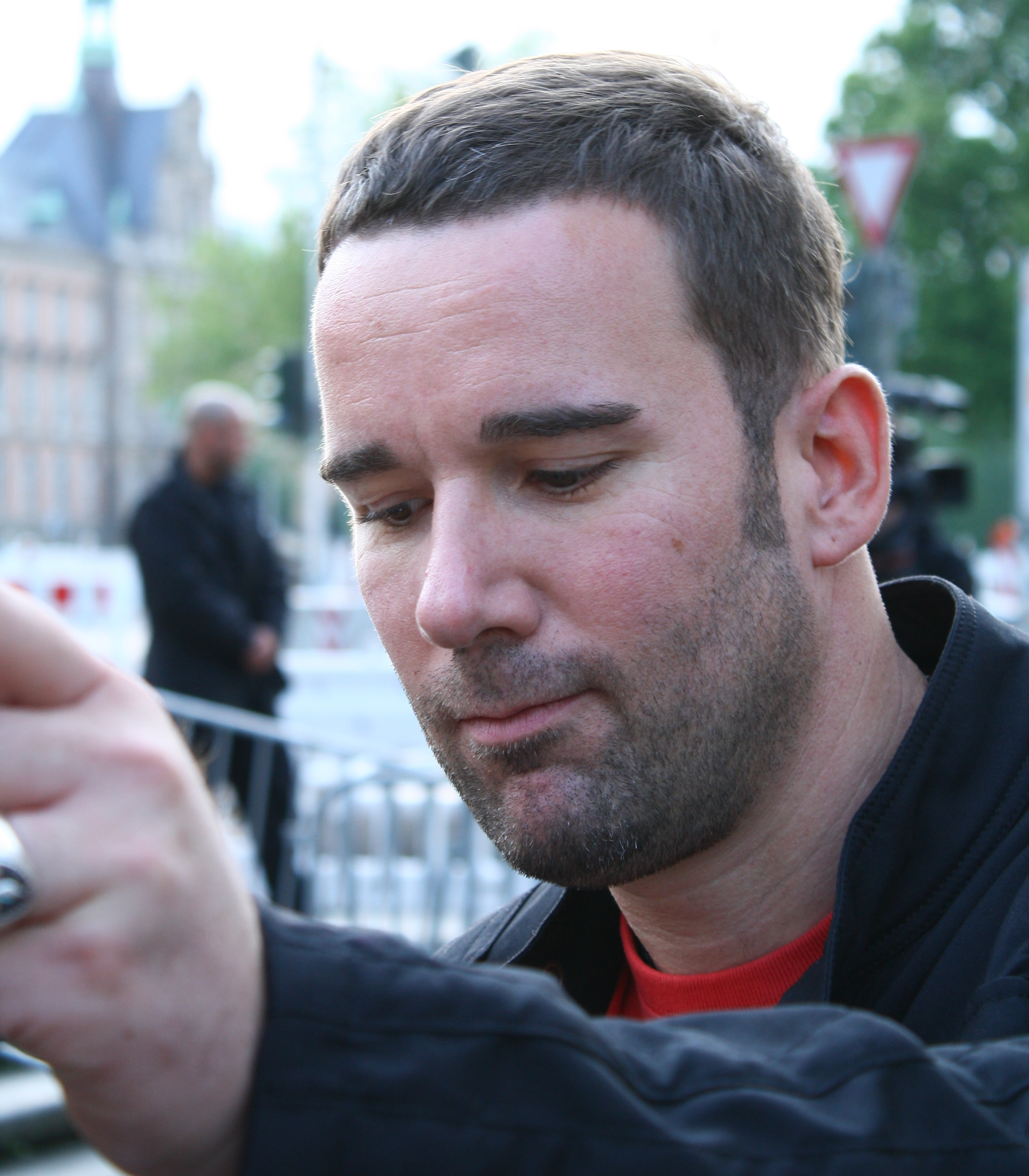
- Neumüller in 2009
- Born: 18 October 1969 (age 55); Cuxhaven, West Germany
- Occupation: Music manager
- Known for: Deutschland sucht den Superstar judge

Volker Neumüller (born 18 October 1969) is a German music manager and was known for being a judge on Deutschland sucht den Superstar.

== Career ==
Born in Cuxhaven, Neumüller has been involved in the music industry since 1987. In 1991, he became the A&R director of Record label PolyGram, a position he also later held at Sony BMG. From 2002 to 2004, Neumüller was also the general manager of Epic Records.

Neumüller established "313 Music" in 2005, a record label, management and television production company, together with the likes of Mark Medlock, Melanie C, Alex Christensen, Daniele Negroni, Luca Hänni Kate Hall and Daniel Schuhmacher. He is also the music manager of the band "The Black Pony".

== Deutschland sucht den Superstar ==
Since the fourth season of DSDS, Neumüller has taken over the management of the series winners. He was a judge for seasons six and seven with Dieter Bohlen and Nina Eichinger.
