= Christina Plate =

German actress (born 1965)

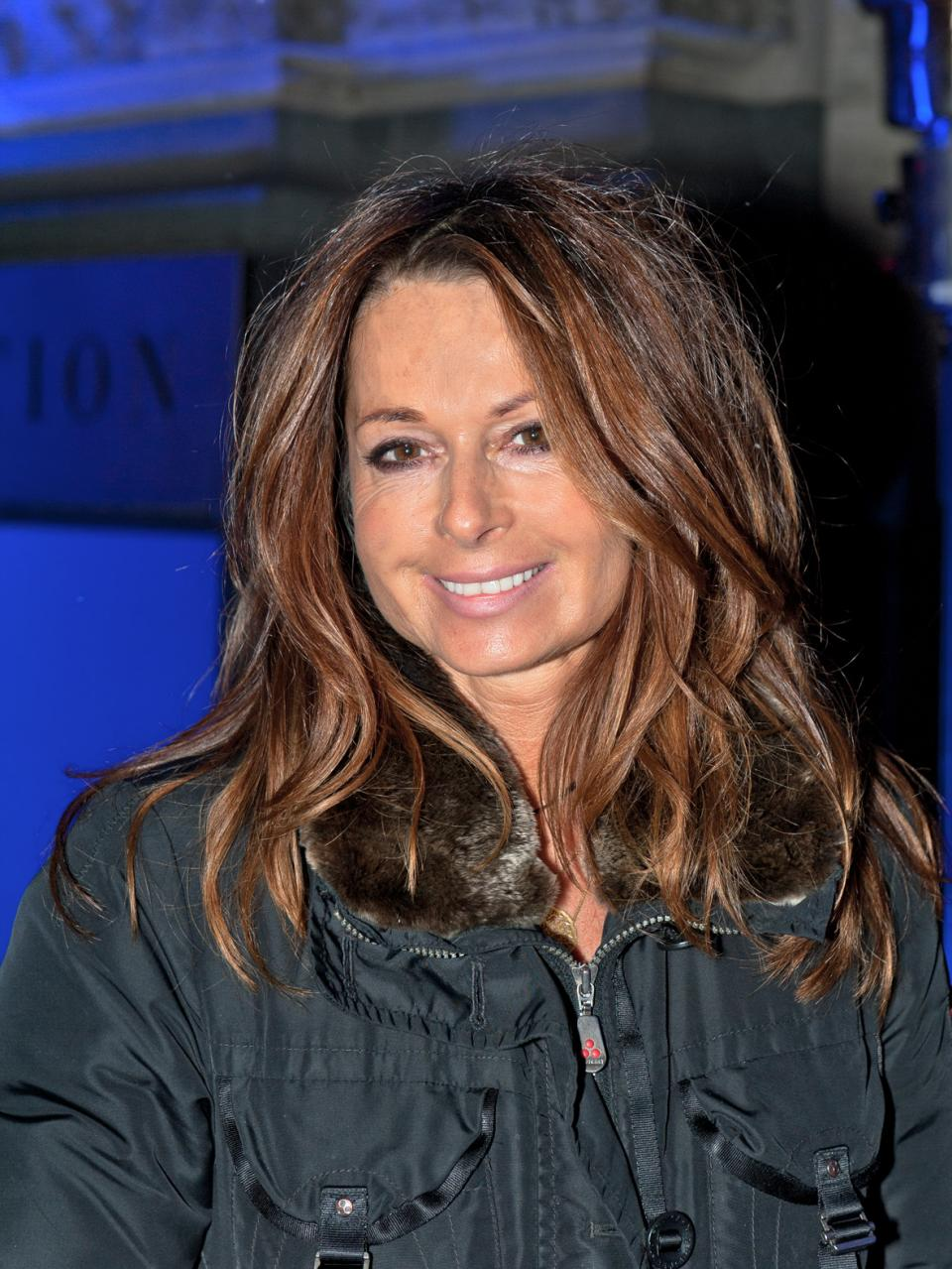
- Plate in 2012
- Born: 21 April 1965 (age 61); West Berlin, West Germany
- Other names: Tina Plate, Tini Plate
- Occupation: Actress
- Spouse: Oliver Geissen
- Children: 1

Christina Plate (born 21 April 1965 in West Berlin) is a German actress. She has appeared in many German films, TV films and series.

Plate won a Bambi in 1988. In 2009, she married German television presenter Oliver Geissen. Together they have three sons.

== Selected filmography ==
- Manni, der Libero (1982, TV series), as Bettina Hohmann
- Eine Klasse für sich (1984–1985, TV series), as Irmgard Eyssen
- Praxis Bülowbogen (1987–1994, TV series), as Sigi Kaul
- Ein Fall für zwei: Wer Gewalt sät (1988, TV series episode), as Julia Remmler
- Die Senkrechtstarter (1989), as Egon
- Molle mit Korn (1989, TV series), as Agathe
- Tatort: Finale am Rothenbaum (1991, TV series episode), as Bettina Richards
- Tatort: Bienzle und der Biedermann (1992, TV series episode), as Cordula Stricker
- Derrick: Das Floß (1994, TV series episode), as Anna Bender
- Derrick: Teestunde mit einer Mörderin? (1995, TV series episode), as Isabel Bruhns
- Zoff und Zärtlichkeit (1995, TV series), as Eva Jacobson
- Florida Lady (1996, TV series), as Iris Tecklenburg
- Tatort: Schneefieber (1996, TV series episode), as Manu Münter
- Der Mond scheint auch für Untermieter (1996–1997, TV series), as Susanne Wellinghaus
- Rosamunde Pilcher: Klippen der Liebe (1999, TV film), as April
- Der kleine Mönch (2002–2003, TV series), as Ursula Foges
- The Old Fox: Kein Tag zum Sterben (2002, TV series episode), as Monika John
- The Old Fox: Späte Rache (2003, TV series episode), as Nina Kampermann
- The Old Fox: Alle Hoffnung begraben (2004, TV series episode), as Jutta Dubinsky
- Familie Dr. Kleist (2004–2011, TV series), as Marlene Kleist
- The Old Fox: Schweigegeld (2004, TV series episode), as Simone Walldorf
- Utta Danella: Tanz auf dem Regenbogen (2007, TV film), as Sylvie van Helsing
- Cologne P.D. (2015–2016, TV series), as Nina Jacobs
