= Shona Fraser =

English music journalist (born 1975)

Shona Kathryn Fraser (born 9 July 1975 (age 51) in Newcastle, England) is a music journalist in Germany, the United Kingdom, and France, having worked for the BBC, MTV, and WDR. She was a judge on Deutschland sucht den Superstar, the German version of Pop Idol, and also represented Germany as a judge on World Idol.
