= Davin Herbrüggen =

German singer

- Born: 25 August 1998 (age 27); Oberhausen, North Rhine-Westphalia, Germany
- Occupation: Singer
- Years active: 2019–present
- Musical career
- Instrument: Vocals

Davin Herbrüggen (born 25 August 1998) is a German singer who won the sixteenth season of Deutschland sucht den Superstar (the German version of Pop Idol). His winning song "The River" was produced by Madizin.

== Life and career ==
Herbrüggen finished secondary school with Mittlere Reife and began an internship training as a Personal Care Assistant. From summer 2018 he took part in the casting show Deutschland sucht den Superstar and on April 27, 2019, he won the season finale. Herbrüggen received a record contract with Universal Music Group and prize money of €100,000. In the music video for his single winner The River, the former plays Germany's Next Topmodel contestant Gerda Lewis the female lead. With 34th place in the German single charts, Herbrüggen achieved the worst chart placement of a “DSDS” winning song. In September 2019 he released his second and first German-language single O Wie Du. He also accompanied Die Lochis as a support act on their farewell tour. In December 2019, Herbrüggen stepped in Oberhausen as support of Xavier Naidoo. In an edition of Wer weiß denn sowas? (Who knows something like that?) Herbrüggen won against Luca Hänni on January 30, 2020. In 2022, Herbrüggen outed himself as homosexual.

== Discography ==
=== Singles ===
- 2019 – "The River"
- 2019 – "O Wie Du"
- 2019 – "Wenn der Vorhang fällt"
