= Fernanda Brandão =

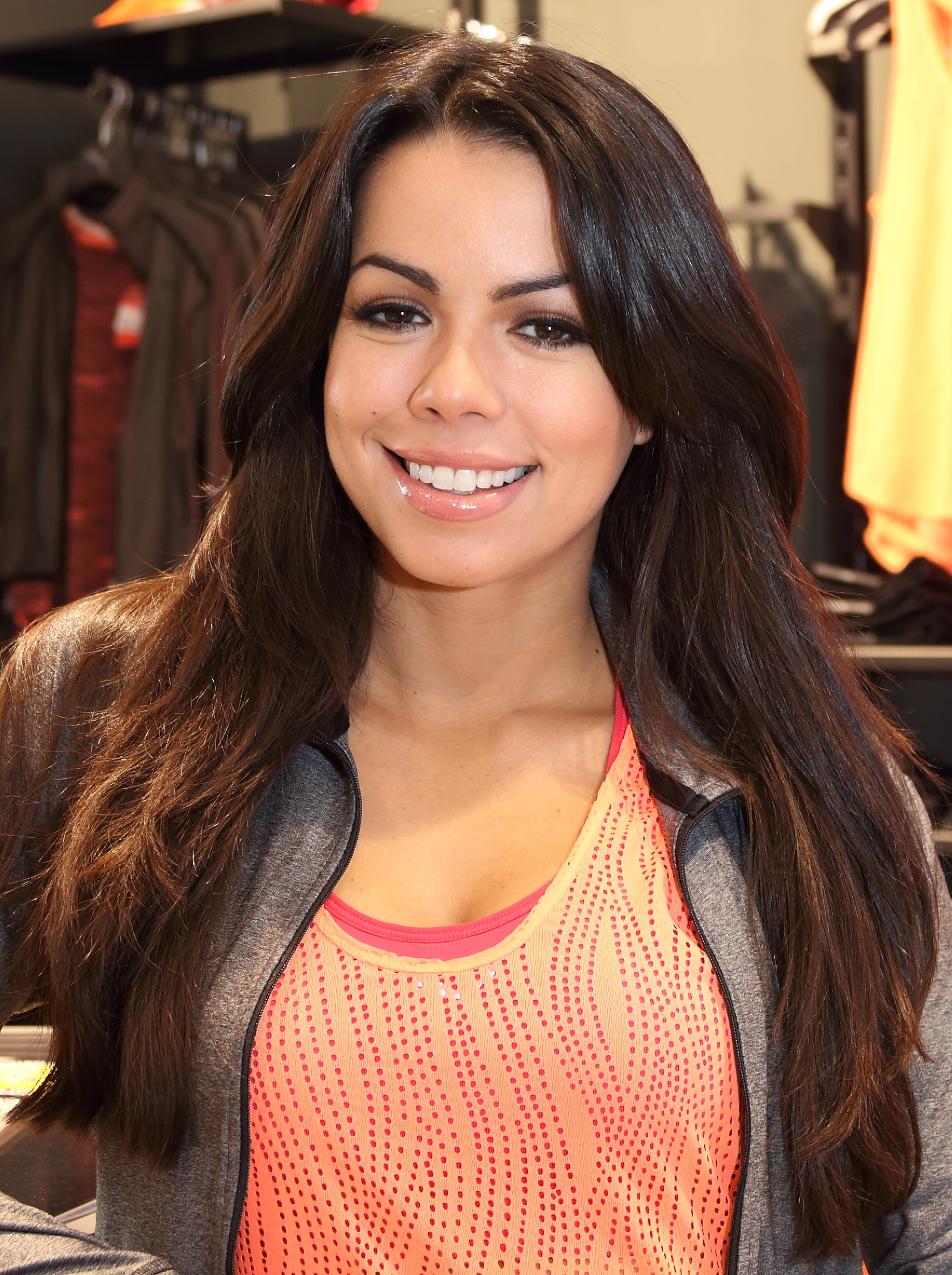
- Brandão in 2016

Background information
- Also known as: Laava
- Born: 3 May 1983 (age 43); Belo Horizonte, Brazil
- Genres: Pop; dance-pop; Latin pop
- Occupations: Singer; dancer; songwriter
- Years active: 2002–present
- Labels: Edel; Robbins; Polydor; Universal
- Website: fernanda-brandao.de

Fernanda Brandão Gonçalves da Silva (born 3 May 1983) is a Brazilian singer and dancer based in Munich, Germany. She became famous under her stage name Laava, then with Latin pop trio, Hot Banditoz.

== Early life ==
Brandão was born in Belo Horizonte, Brazil, and grew up in Rio de Janeiro. By the age of four, she had danced at the Rio Carnival and sung to samba folklore hits. She came from an artistic family, with her mother having produced some successful Brazilian pop songs, and her aunt and uncle being well-known singers in Brazil, and she spent much of her childhood in recording studios.

When she was nine, she moved with her family to Hamburg, Germany. Although her music originates from Germany, Brandão considers herself a Brazilian and often travels between the two countries.

== Career ==
=== Commercial success ===
In Germany, she took lessons in jazz, modern dance, hip hop, ballet and voice. Brandão, who speaks Portuguese, Spanish, German and English, left school early in 2001, so as to be able to concentrate solely on her music career. She also appeared as a dancer in many music videos and live shows for major international artistes including Enrique Iglesias, Kylie Minogue, Pink, Shaggy, Coolio, Gabriella Cilmi, Safri Duo and rock group Seed.

She has participated in various stage and television appearances of artists including Modern Talking, ATC, Sarah Connor and Rick Astley. As well as being a choreographer for various music videos, fashion shows and events, she is a licensed fitness trainer in aerobics, body pump and Tae Bo.

=== Laava launch ===
From 2002 to 2004, Brandão gained popularity as a solo singer in America, Canada and Europe, under the alias Laava, with her dance-pop song Wherever You Are (I Feel Love), which was released through Edel Records in Germany and Robbins Entertainment in America. The track was written especially for her by Hamburg songwriters Pop Master, Sliteye and Newsky, who along with Dr. E., had created successful productions with The Underdog Project, Dune vs Trubblemaker, Rumble Rokkaz, Funky Divas, ScapeBabyz, Nana and Kenny Blake. Various techno and Eurodance versions of the song were released including one by Yugoslavian-German electronic dance music producer DJ Pulsedriver, remixer for Vengaboys, Lasgo, Ian Van Dahl, Sinéad O'Connor and Kim Wilde, and one by Stuttgart's DJ Chopstick, who has produced and remixed for Madonna, Britney Spears, LL Cool J, Deep Dish and Sister Sledge. The video for the song was directed by Swedish director, Patric Ullaeus.

=== Music collaborations ===
From 2004 to 2010, Brandão was a member of the Latin pop group, Hot Banditoz, known for its summer-Latino sound. The group also included Bolivian (La Paz) singer, Gabriela Gottschalk (former member of the Super Moonies), German singer and actor Silva Gonzalez, and from 2008, Chilean (Valparaíso) singer and songwriter, José Valdes. Their debut single Veo, Veo, released on Polydor in 2004, became a number 3 hit in Germany, achieving gold status, and was one of five songs to stay in the German charts for more than eight weeks, during that year. This was followed by several more singles including Shake Your Balla which reached position 5 in the Media Control Charts, and two studio albums Mini Disco in 2004 and Bodyshaker in 2007, which both reached the top 50 in Germany, and a compilation album Best of Holiday Club Hits, also in 2007, all for Universal Music. The group were successful in Europe, Asia and the Middle East.

In 2010, the electropop song Gigolo, sung by Brandão in Portuguese, was released as a promotional video directed by Moritz Krebs and Matthias Lorenz-Meyer. The song was produced by Grammy-nominated German-Asian producer Taan Newjam, who has also created music for Britney Spears, Omarion, and Sugababes, and co-written by Brandão and Newjam.

=== Television appearances ===
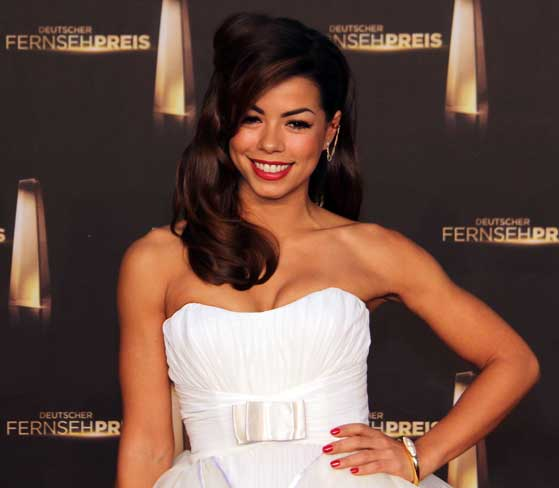
Brandão attending the 2012 German Television Award

In 2011, Brandão was invited to be a member of the jury, in the 8th season of the popular German television talent show Deutschland sucht den Superstar which aired on RTL, alongside German songwriter Dieter Bohlen and Swiss singer Patrick Nuo. She also appeared in the German edition of the French television game show Fort Boyard.

In the summer of 2011, Brandão was invited to appear on an Austrian season of the German music casting television series Popstars, titled "Mission Österreich" (2011), as a celebrity juror, alongside German choreographer Detlef Soost, on Puls 4.

=== German developments ===
In July 2011, Brandão appeared as the cover star of the German edition of men's magazine FHM, having been voted in a survey of 150,000 of its readers as "Sexiest Woman in the World 2011".

== Personal life ==
Brandão currently lives in Lapland, and is engaged to Roman Weber, an adventurer and survival expert, since 2021, whom she first met in 2020. She had her first child with him in April 2022, a daughter named Aurora (though needed an emergency cesarean section as she suffered severe pre-eclampsia), and a second in 2024, a son (where she decided to give birth to back in Germany to avoid the complications from the first birth).

== Discography ==
=== Solo singles ===
- 2002: Laava Wherever You Are (I Feel Love), Club Tools/Edel Records, Germany
- 2003: Laava Wherever You Are (I Feel Love), Robbins Entertainment, US
- 2010: Fernanda Brandao Vs. Taan Newjam Gigolo, Urbasian Music/Dragonman Entertainment, Germany

=== Group singles ===
- 2004: Hot Banditoz Veo, Veo, Polydor, Germany
- 2004: Hot Banditoz Chucu Chucu (El Tren), Polydor, Germany
- 2005: Hot Banditoz Shake Your Balla (1,2,3 Alarma), Polydor, Germany
- 2006: Hot Banditoz La Cucaracha Dance, Universal, Germany
- 2006: Hot Banditoz I Want It That Way, Polydor, Germany
- 2007: Hot Banditoz Que Si, Que No, Polydor, Germany

=== Group albums ===
- 2004: Hot Banditoz Mini Disco, Universal, Germany
- 2005: Hot Banditoz Mini Disco, Tancevalnij Raj, Russia
- 2007: Hot Banditoz Bodyshaker, Universal, Germany
- 2007: Hot Banditoz Best of Holiday Club Hits, Universal, Germany
