= Lorielle London =

German transgender entertainer

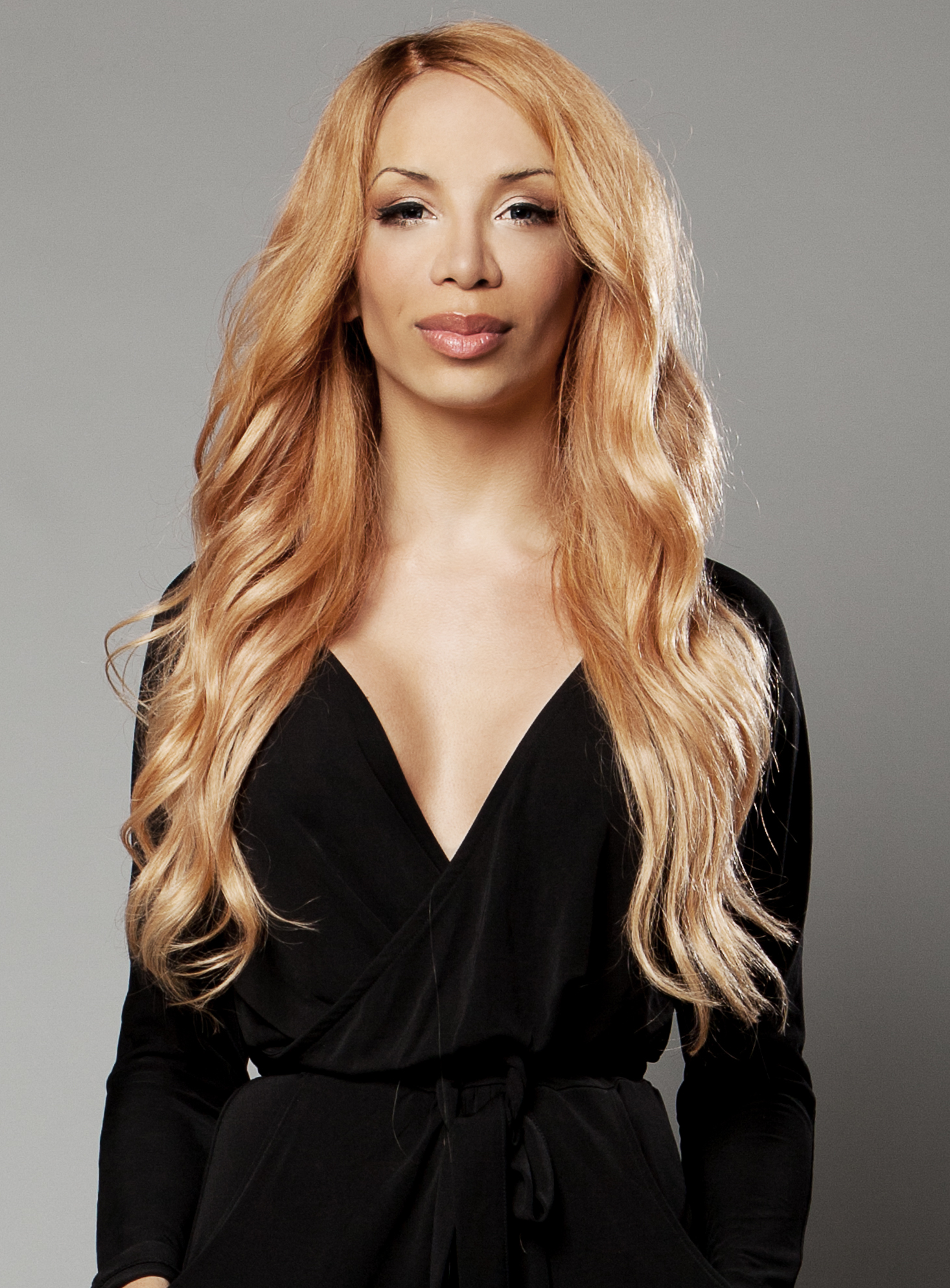
London in 2011

Lorielle London (born 24 December 1983 in Birkenfeld, West Germany) is a German transgender entertainer and television personality.

== Biography ==
=== Early life ===
London was born in 1983 in Birkenfeld to a German fashion seamstress and an American soldier and grew up in nearby Baumholder.

From childhood until her television debut, she worked exclusively in various performing and visual artistic professions. London was discovered in a children's art school by an art professor and began to study painting at the university of Idar-Oberstein at the age of 12. In the following years, her works were displayed in various exhibitions for sale. Her mother acted as her agent.

London discovered her love for singing in an American gospel choir. As a solo performer, she made several appearances at festivals, giving concerts, and was hired as lead vocalist for various bands.

In addition, she devoted herself to a form of acrobatics called 'contortion', which she trained and performed for 17 years. At that time, she was one of the very few professional male contortionists in Germany.

Due to a drastic voice change during puberty, she gave up her singing ambitions and decided to follow in her mother's footsteps to study fashion design.

=== TV debut ===
Lorielle London entered as a contestant for the second season of Deutschland sucht den Superstar (part of the Idol franchise) in 2003. After not advancing in the first season, she applied the following season with the song "I Just Called to Say I Love You" by Stevie Wonder and eventually finished in tenth place out of 40,000 applicants. Although her singing talent was prominent, she attracted attention with her androgynous appearance and gestures that were often discussed and ridiculed in satirical programs. London says that she had to learn how to accept this new image very quickly that was contrary to her previous life as an artist.

=== Other work ===
After leaving Deutschland sucht den Superstar, the interest in London as an entertainer remained. She appeared in different series, shows and numerous celebrity and lifestyle-news broadcasts. In 2004, London, among others, entered the reality TV show Die Alm ("The Farm"). Die Alm, which, after initial airing received low ratings, increased its viewership dramatically once London was hired. The television network ProSieben then decided to extend the series by an extra week and London remained until the final. Following the program, she regularly appeared on various tabloid shows on Sat.1, such as Das Sat.1 Frühstücksfernsehen ("Sat.1 Breakfast Show"). She made her acting debut in 2006, in a comedy remake of Little Red Riding Hood. The film was released under the title Die ProSieben Märchenstunde: Rotkäpchen – Wege zum Glück.

In autumn of 2006, London publicly came out as transgender and announced that her artist name for the future would be 'Lory Glory'. In addition, she underwent sex reassignment surgery. American gospel singer Lori Hölzel with the artist name 'Lori Glori' procured a court order that forbade London from using that particular choice of name due to likelihood of confusion. The transgender entertainer then became 'Lorielle London'.

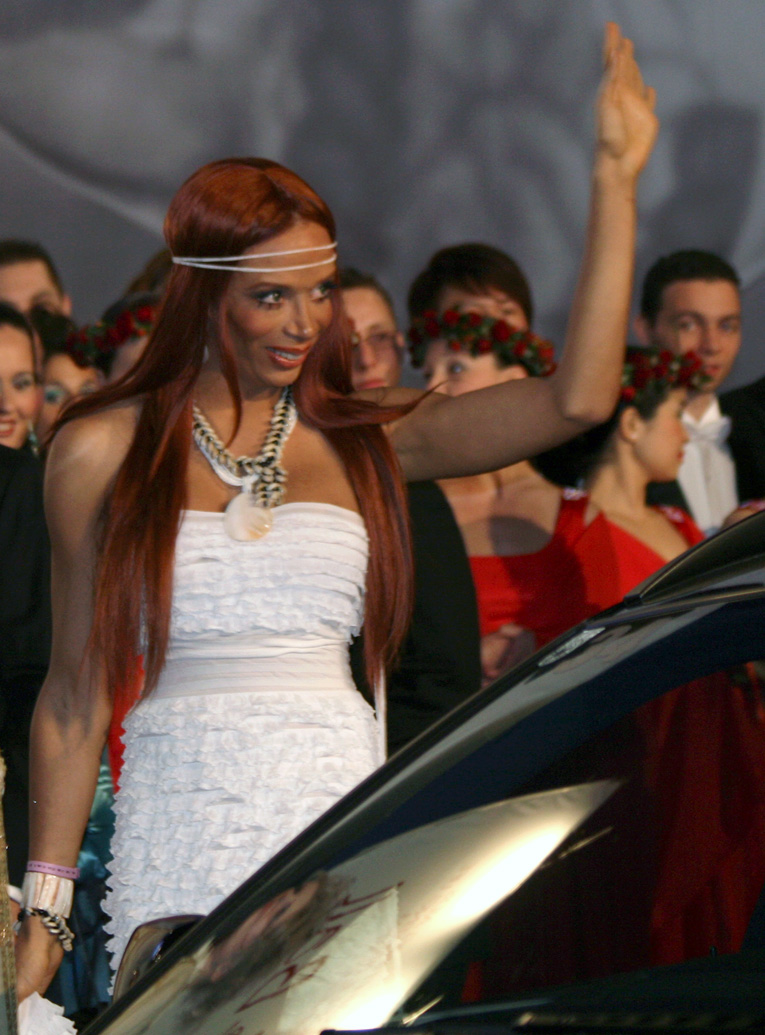
London at Life Ball 2009

In January 2009, London entered as a contestant on the German version of I'm a Celebrity...Get Me Out of Here! on RTL. Despite all preconceptions, one of the most respected German newspapers, FAZ, described her performance as "human, vulnerable and real". London eventually finished second behind actress Ingrid van Bergen.

Since then, she has been active as a television host, reporter and co-anchor. RTL hired London as a red carpet correspondent for the Echo Award ceremony (the biggest German music award ceremony). She interviewed celebrities such as Taylor Swift and Lionel Richie, among others. For the Deutschland sucht den Superstar final 2009, London returned for the special "Night of the Superstars", this time as a backstage reporter. As a celebrity guest and co-host on Big Brother Germany, she co-hosted with TV presenter Miriam Pielhau and later made two more celebrity-guest appearances on Big Brother in 2010.

The television production company Norddeich TV hired London in 2011 for a show called Die Schulermittler ("the school investigators") to mentor a young transgender. The show aired on 19 October 2011 on RTL. In the same year, she moved to London, England with her partner.

In 2012, London appeared on the RTL show Total Blackout, where she won against candidates like Roberto Blanco and Jimi Blue Ochsenknecht, and eventually became "Queen of Dark" She also worked as a reporter on the RTL Nitro show Ich bin ein Star – Holt mich hier raus – Das Magazin in 2013, where she reported daily on current events.

== Television appearances ==
London has been in several television productions as both a contestant and actress:

- 2003–2004: Deutschland sucht den Superstar (RTL)
- 2004: Die Alm – Promischweiß und Edelweiß (ProSieben)
- 2006: Die ProSieben Märchenstunde – episode "Rotkäppchen: Wege zum Glück" (as 'Mieser Barde') (ProSieben)
- 2008: DSDS – Das große Wiedersehen (RTL)
- 2009: Ich bin ein Star – Holt mich hier raus! (RTL)
- 2009: Das perfekte Promi-Dinner (VOX)
- 2009: Promi Kocharena (VOX)
- 2009: Mrs. Hankey's Christmas Special
- 2009–2010: Big Brother (RTL II)
- 2010: Der große deutsche Führerschein-Test (RTL II)
- 2011: Die Schulermittler (as Herself) (RTL)
- 2013: Promi Shopping Queen (VOX)
- 2014: Frauendingsbums (Sixx)
