= DSDS Kids season 1 =

DSDS Kids
- Season 1
- Hosted by: Daniel Aßmann
- Judges: Dieter Bohlen; Michelle Hunziker; Dana Schweiger
- Winner: Marco Kappel

Release
- Original network: RTL
- Original release: 5 May – 25 May 2012

DSDS Kids was the only season of the kids version of Deutschland sucht den Superstar. Broadcaster RTL announced on 13 March 2012 that there will be a kids edition of DSDS for children between the ages of 4 and 14. Parents had up until 31 March 2012 to register their children. The first show was scheduled to start on 5 May 2012 at 20:15. Dieter Bohlen, Michelle Hunziker and Dana Schweiger were named to the jury and Daniel Aßmann served as the host.

In April 2013, RTL decided that DSDS Kids will not return for a second season. There were only four shows planned for the first season and no auditions were shown. The first three shows showed each step of the ten children who would eventually qualify for the finals. There were 38,664 applications for season 1 of the show.

== Semi-finals ==
=== First semi-final ===
Original airdate: 5 May 2012

Contestants	Song (Artist)	Percentage of calls
Timmy	"Grenade" (Bruno Mars)	
Gala	"Rolling in the Deep" (Adele)	
Samuel	"Easy" (Cro)	
Erisa	"Alles nur in meinem Kopf" (Andreas Bourani)	
Pina	"Footprints in the Sand" (Leona Lewis)	
Skyla	"Schlumpfenstern" (cover version of "Call My Name") (The Smurfs)	
Julius	"The Lazy Song" (Bruno Mars)	
Alysha	"Tik Tok" (Kesha)	
Selina	"Stadt" (Cassandra Steen)	
Besnik	"Someone Like You" (Adele)	

- Voted through the final: Besnik, Timmy, Alysha
- Eliminated: Gala, Samuel, Erisa, Pina, Skyla, Julius, Selina

=== Second semi-final ===
Original airdate: 11 May 2012

Contestants	Song (Artist)	Percentage of calls
Malcom	"Billionaire" (Travie McCoy feat. Bruno Mars)	
Vanilla	"Für dich" (Yvonne Catterfeld)	
Nico	"Can You Feel the Love Tonight" (Elton John)	
Laura	"Use Somebody" (Kings of Leon)	
Michael-Chung	"Und wenn ein Lied" (Söhne Mannheims)	
Hakan	"Just the Way You Are" (Bruno Mars)	
Alina	"Mama Do (Uh Oh, Uh Oh)" (Pixie Lott)	
Lisa-Marie	"We Found Love" (Rihanna feat. Calvin Harris)	
Marco	"Wanted Dead or Alive" (Bon Jovi)	
Noemi	"Price Tag" (Jessie J)	

- Voted through the final: Alina, Vanilla, Marco
- Eliminated: Malcom, Nico, Laura, Michael-Chung, Hakan, Lisa-Marie, Noemi

=== Third semi-final ===
Original airdate: 18 May 2012

Contestants	Song (Artist)	Percentage of calls
Gianni Laffontien	"Que Sera, Sera" (Hermes House Band)	
Stefani	"Mercy" (Duffy)	
Marcel Kaiser	"Someone Like You" (Adele)	
Latifa	"1000 km bis zum Meer" (Luxuslärm)	
Anita	"Smile" (Michael Jackson)	
Sinan	"Nur kurz die Welt retten" (Tim Bendzko)	
Verena	"Because of You" (Kelly Clarkson)	
Jakob	"Schön ist es auf der Welt zu sein" (Roy Black)	
Yves	"Heart Skips a Beat" (Olly Murs)	
Shania	"Hallelujah" (Alexandra Burke)	

- Voted through the final: Marcel, Shania, Yves
- Eliminated: Gianni, Stefani, Latifa, Anita, Sinan, Verena, Jakob

== Final ==
Original airdate: 25 May 2012

Contestants	Song (Artist)	Percentage of calls
Alysha	"Ai se eu te pego!" (Michel Teló)	
Yves	"The Lazy Song" (Bruno Mars)	
Shania	"Somebody That I Used to Know" (Gotye feat. Kimbra)	
Gianni	"Danza Kuduro" (Don Omar feat. Lucenzo)	
Alina	"Almost Lover" (A Fine Frenzy)	
Timmy	"You Give Me Something" (James Morrison)	
Besnik	"Rolling in the Deep" (Adele)	
Vanilla	"Unforgettable" (Nat King Cole)	
Marcel	"Set Fire to the Rain" (Adele)	
Marco	"Nothing Else Matters" (Metallica)	

- Winner: Marco
- 2nd to 10th place: Alysha, Yves, Shania, Gianni, Alina, Timmy, Besnik, Vanilla, Marcel

== Elimination chart ==
Legend
Did not perform	Female	Male	Semi-final	Final	Winner

Stage:		Semi-finals			WC	Final
Week:		5/5	5/11	5/18	5/25	
Place	Contestant	Result				
1	Marco Kappel		Final			Winner
2-10	Alina		Final			Elim
2-10	Alysha	Final				Elim
2-10	Besnik	Final				Elim
2-10	Gianni Laffontien			Elim	Final	Elim
2-10	Marcel Kaiser			Final		Elim
2-10	Shania			Final		Elim
2-10	Timmy	Final				Elim
2-10	Vanilla		Final			Elim
2-10	Yves			Final		Elim
Semi- Final 3	Anita			Elim		
Semi- Final 3	Jakob			Elim		
Semi- Final 3	Latifa			Elim		
Semi- Final 3	Sinan			Elim		
Semi- Final 3	Stefani			Elim		
Semi- Final 3	Verena			Elim		
Semi- Final 2	Hakan		Elim			
Semi- Final 2	Laura		Elim			
Semi- Final 2	Lisa-Marie		Elim			
Semi- Final 2	Malcom		Elim			
Semi- Final 2	Michael-Chung		Elim			
Semi- Final 2	Nico		Elim			
Semi- Final 2	Noemi		Elim			
Semi- Final 1	Erisa	Elim				
Semi- Final 1	Gala	Elim				
Semi- Final 1	Julius	Elim				
Semi- Final 1	Pina	Elim				
Semi- Final 1	Samuel	Elim				
Semi- Final 1	Selina	Elim				
Semi- Final 1	Skyla	Elim				

- The judges decided the tenth contestant for the final as the "WildCard Contestant" and this person presented in the final week.
