= Sem Eisinger =

German singer (born 1994)

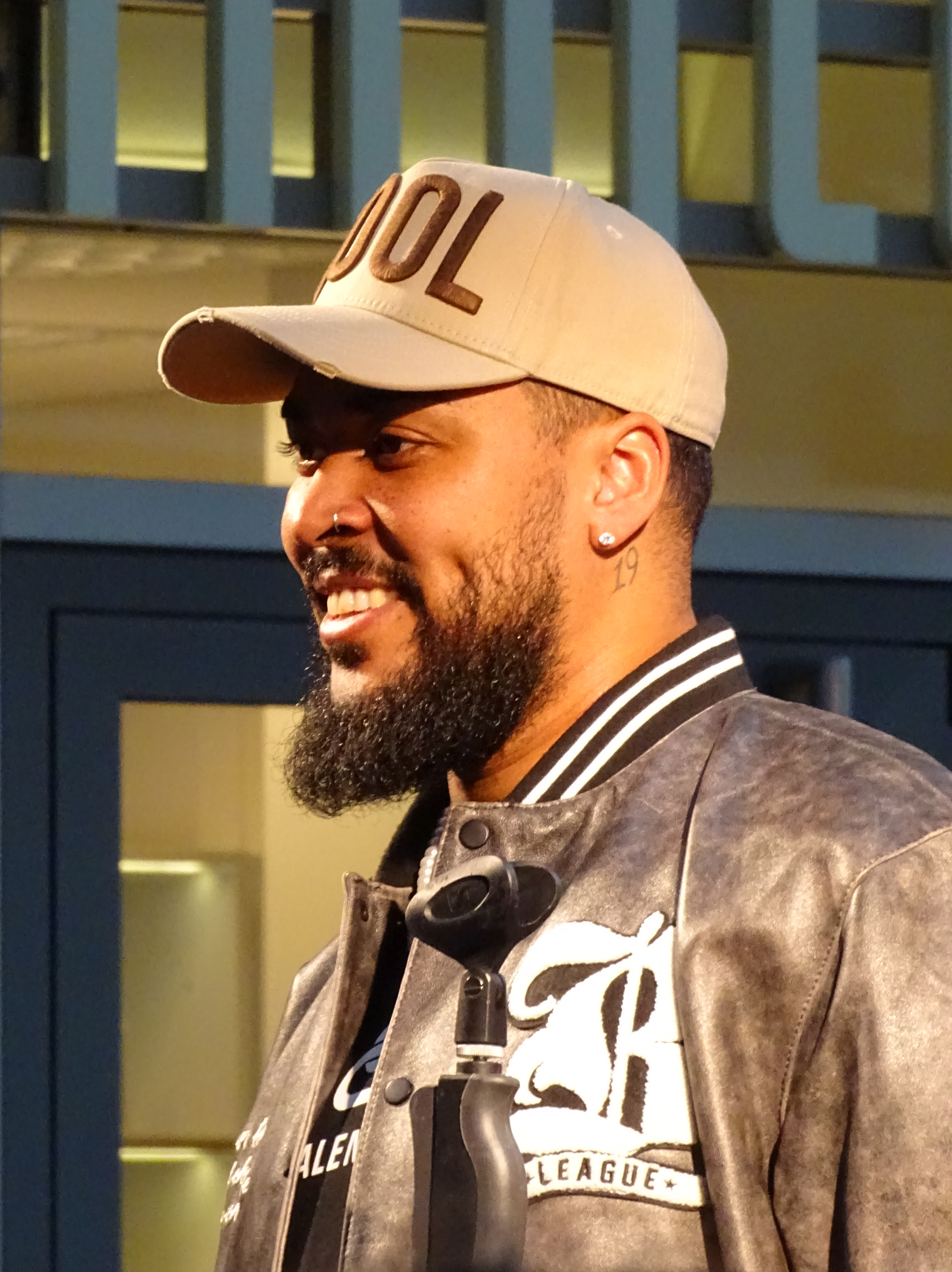
- Eisinger in 2023

Background information
- Born: 1994 (age 31–32); Ober-Roden, Rödermark, Hesse, Germany
- Genres: Pop
- Occupation: Singer
- Label: Universal Music

Sem Eisinger (born 1994) is a German pop singer. He won the 20th season of the talent show Deutschland sucht den Superstar in 2023.

== Early and personal life ==
Eisinger spent part of his childhood in Mallorca and moved back to Germany with his family after 2010, initially living in Ober-Roden. He has previously worked as a bartender and in parcel delivery. He lives in Frankfurt, is married, and has a daughter.

== Musical career ==
In 2016, Eisinger participated in the 6th season of the talent show The Voice of Germany, where he was eliminated from the "Battles" on Samu Haber's team. Since 2017, he has regularly performed at the annual Riaz and Friends concert in Schöningen, organized by Fabian Riaz.

In 2023, Eisinger was a candidate in the 20th season of Deutschland sucht den Superstar, which he won in the final with 54.81% of the audience votes. He dedicated his winning song, "Don't Let Me Go," to his father, who died a few hours before Eisinger's performance in the first live show. As the winner of the singing competition, he received a recording contract with Universal Music, a prize money of 100,000 euros, and appearances as the support act for Dieter Bohlen's comeback tour. With his winning song, "Don't Let Me Go," Eisinger entered the German singles charts at number 57 on 21 April 2023. On 23 April 2023, he entered the Swiss singles charts at number 35. His second single, "Rodeo Love," was released on 25 August 2023. In September, he appeared on ZDF-Fernsehgarten.

== Discography ==
=== Singles ===
List of singles, with selected chart positions, sales and certifications
Title	Details	Peak chart positions			Album
Title	Details	GER	AUT	SWI	Album
"Don’t Let Me Go"	2023	57	47	35	Non-album singles
"Rodeo Love"	2023	—	—	—	Non-album singles
"—" denotes a title that did not chart, or was not released in that territory.
