= Eine Klasse für sich =

German television series

- Written by: Peter M. Thouet
- Directed by: Frank Strecker
- Music by: Willy Hoffmann, Siro Music
- Country of origin: Germany
- Original language: German language
- No. of seasons: 1
- No. of episodes: 25

Production
- Running time: 25 minutes

Original release
- Network: ZDF
- Release: November 27, 1984

Eine Klasse für sich was a German family television series that premiered on ZDF from November 27, 1984, to June 18, 1985. The 25-part series was directed by Frank Strecker and written by Peter M. Thouet.

== Plot ==
The series is set in a boarding school located in a castle, where students face both interpersonal and academic challenges that are ultimately resolved with the support of the community.

The film depicts rebellious teenagers—some still in puberty—grappling with questions about their lives and futures. They embody the West German protest culture of the 1960s, ’70s, and early ’80s, often clashing with parents and teachers who cannot fully understand or accept it. These generational tensions contribute to the conflicts highlighted throughout the story.

== See also ==
- List of German television series
