= Raúl Richter =

German television and voice actor (born 1987)

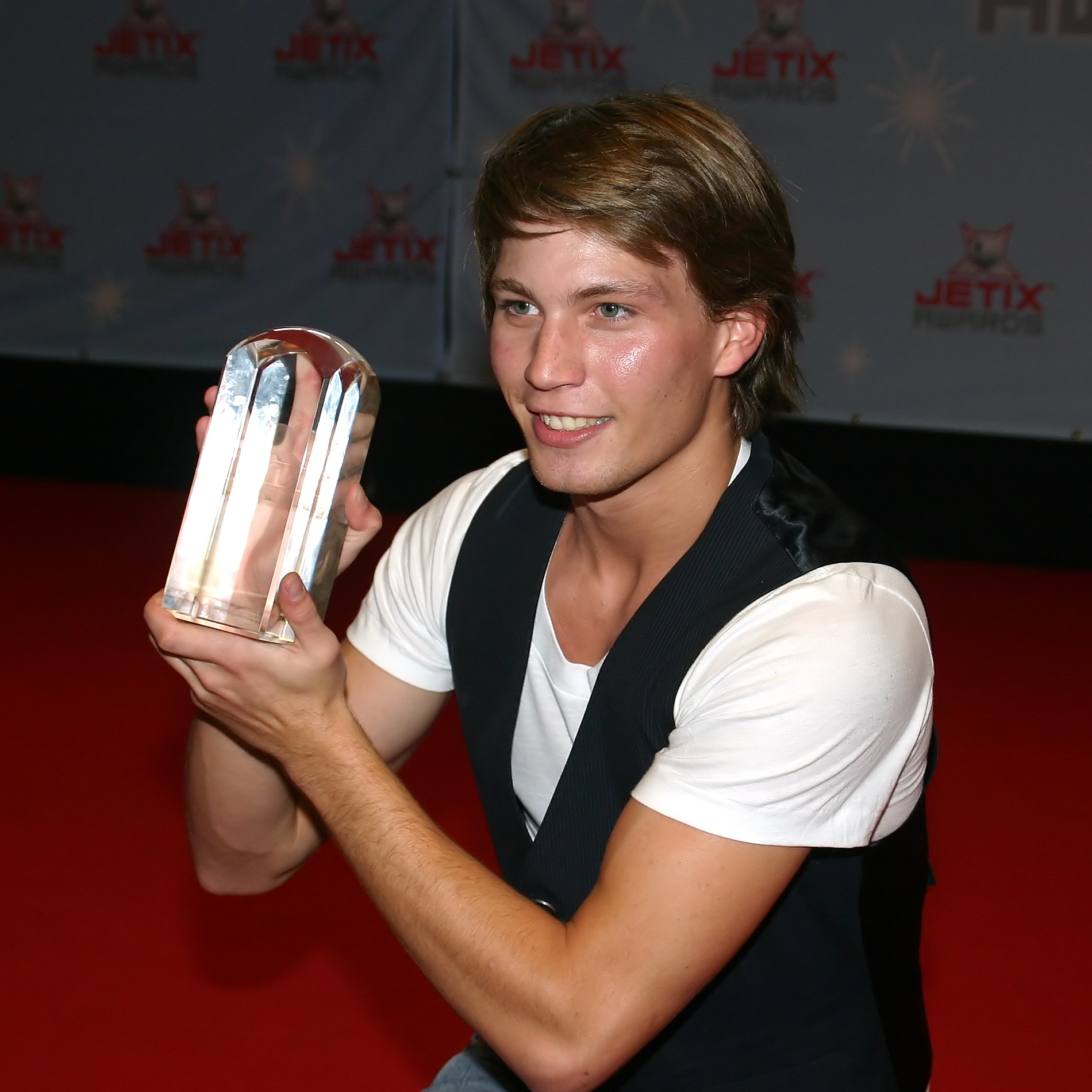
- Raúl Richter in 2008
- Born: 31 January 1987 (age 38); West Berlin, West Germany
- Website: www.raul-richter.de

Raúl Amadeus Mark Richter (born 31 January 1987 in West Berlin) is a German television and voice actor well known for his portrayal of Nik Gundlach in the German soap opera Gute Zeiten, schlechte Zeiten.

Richter, who spent his early years in Peru, took part in Let's Dance, the German version of Dancing with the Stars, in 2010.
