= Nina Eichinger =

German TV presenter and actress

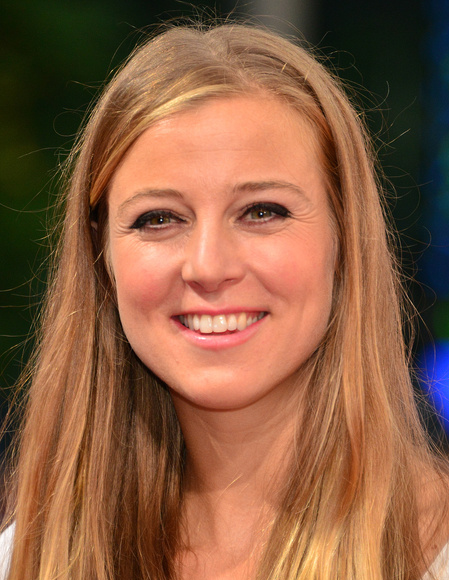
- Eichinger at the Berlin premiere of Sex Tape, 2014
- Born: 16 September 1981 (age 43); Munich, West Germany
- Occupation(s): TV presenter, actress

Nina Eichinger (born 16 September 1981) is a German television presenter and actress.

Eichinger was born in Munich, the daughter of film producer and director Bernd Eichinger. She was an MTV VJ and has been a jury member for Deutschland sucht den Superstar, seasons 6 and 7. However, she missed the final of season 7 after being stuck in Los Angeles following flight restrictions as a result of the 2010 eruptions of Eyjafjallajökull. She also played roles in The Three Musketeers, The Baader Meinhof Complex and other movies.
