= Isi Glück =

German singer (born 1991)

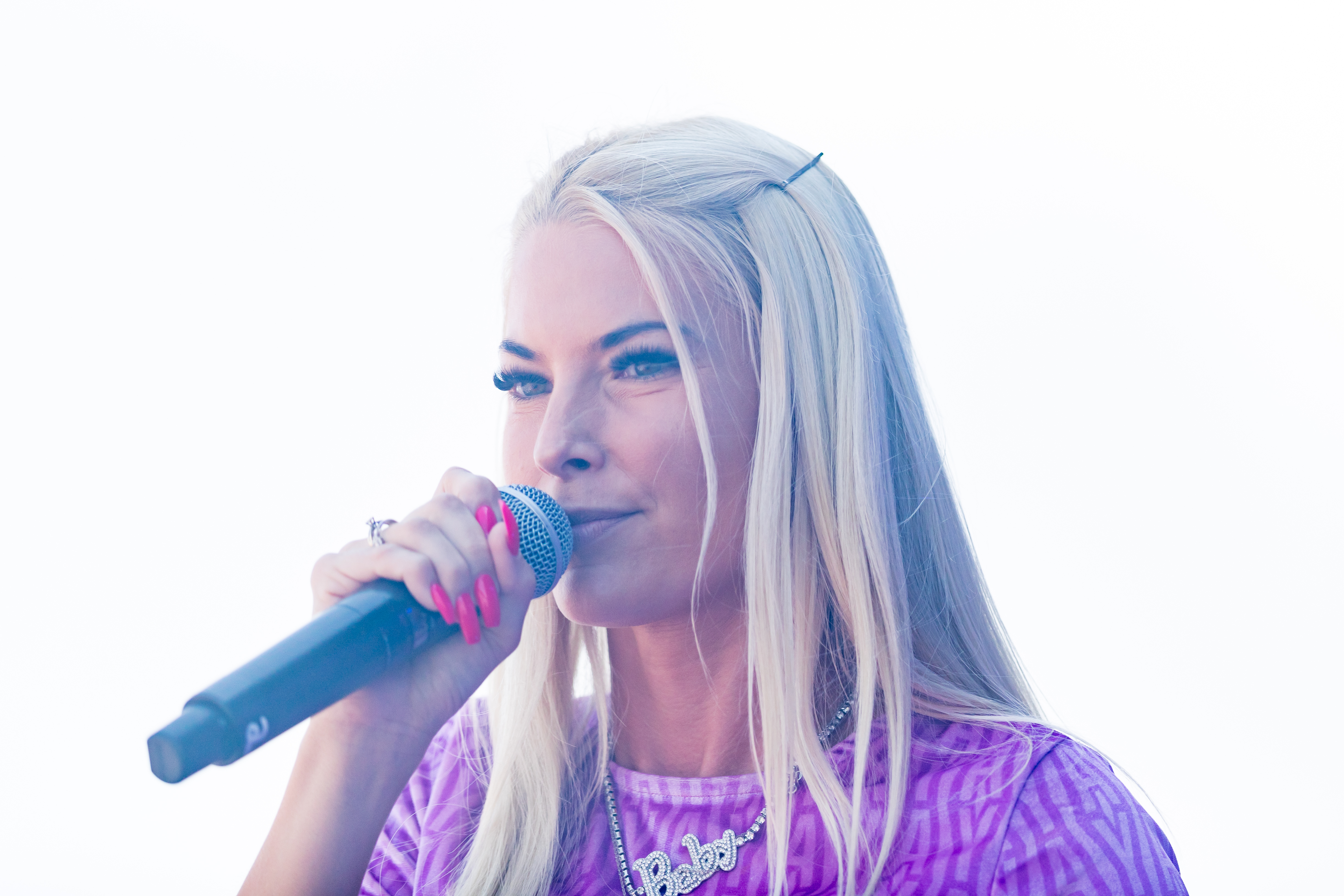
- Glück in 2022

Background information
- Born: Isabel Gülck; 11 February 1991 (age 35); Elmshorn, Schleswig-Holstein, Germany
- Genres: Partyschlager
- Occupation: Singer

Isabel Gülck (born 11 February 1991), known professionally as Isi Glück, is a German partyschlager singer. Since 2017, she has performed regularly at the Mega-Park in Mallorca and, in winter, at the "Kuhstall" in Ischgl.

== Biography ==
Isabel Gülck was born on 11 February 1991 in Elmshorn, Schleswig-Holstein. After attending elementary school in Kiebitzreihe, she completed her secondary school diploma at the Jacob Struve School in Horst (Holstein). This was followed by an apprenticeship as a sports and fitness clerk, then an insurance clerk in her father's company, which she abandoned after the Miss Germany pageant. On 11 February 2012, she won the Miss Germany pageant at Europa-Park Rust. She had previously participated in the Miss Schleswig-Holstein beauty pageant, but was eliminated in the preliminary rounds. She was later crowned Miss Ashampoo. As Miss Germany, she made around 200 appearances until she was replaced by Carolina Noeding on 24 February 2013.

Glück married Mario Buder in 2016. After divorcing Buder, in 2019, she married Carlos Lucio, the former managing director of the Mega-Park nightclub.

== Reality TV ==
At the age of 20, Glück took part in a casting format for the docu-soap Daniela Katzenberger – natürlich blond in 2011 as one of 13 participants. She then participated in the seventh season of Germany's Next Top Model. In 2021, she was a contestant on CoupleChallenge – Das feste Team gewinnen (The Strongest Team Wins) and in 2024 on Kampf der Realitystars – Schiffbruch am Traumstrand (Battle of the Reality Stars – Shipwreck on the Dream Beach).

== Discography ==
=== Studio albums ===
List of studio albums, with selected chart positions
Title	Details	Peak chart positions		
Title	Details	GER	AUT	SWI
Alles Isi	Released: 17 January 2025; Label: Summerfield Records; Format: CD, LP, digital download, streaming	1	13	70
"—" denotes a title that did not chart, or was not released in that territory.

=== Singles ===
- 2017: Ich will zurück zu Dir (Hände hoch Malle)
- 2017: 13 Tage
- 2017: Ein kleines bisschen küssen
- 2017: Der kleine Haifisch
- 2018: Die Kinder von Malle (with Bianca Hill)
- 2018: Das Leben ist ne Party
- 2019: Die Party sind wir
- 2019: Homegirls
- 2019: Wir sind alle da
- 2019: Lichtermeer
- 2020: Tok Tok Tok
- 2020: Ballerina (Mallorca wo die Liebe begann) (with Honk!)
- 2020: Chica Style
- 2021: Geile Zeit
- 2021: Derbe am Feiern
- 2021: Für immer auf Mallorca (with Julian Benz & DJ Mico)
- 2021: Die Berge über uns (with Ikke Hüftgold)
- 2022: Bis die Sonne wieder lacht
- 2022: Ich feier das (with Mütze Katze)
- 2022: Knicklicht
- 2022: Hurra das ganze Dorf ist da (with Dorfrocker)
- 2022: Nachtaktiv
- 2022: Nimm mich mit ins Paradies (with Julian Benz)
- 2022: Kaleidoskop
- 2023: Mein Leben ist ein Club
- 2023: Ich schieß mich weg (with Micha von der Rampe)
- 2023: Delfin (with Honk!)
- 2023: So viel gemeinsam
- 2023: Hey DJ pump den Bass (with Julian Benz)
- 2023: Mallorca mein Löwe mein Bär (with Honk! & Kreisligalegende)
- 2023: Weihnachtsmann & Co. KG
- 2023: Filmriss (with Ikke Hüftgold)
- 2024: Ninja Samurai Party Fighter
- 2024: Mit alles (with Fette Party)
- 2024: Mallearen
- 2024: Oberteil (with Marc Eggers)
- 2024: Finale (with Calvin Kleinen & Kreisligalegende)
- 2024: Heimlich am Strand (with Calvin Kleinen)
- 2024: Mallekind (with Julian Benz)
- 2024: Regenbogen (with Felix Harrer & Honk!)
- 2024: Halt ma’ mein Bier
- 2025: Malle ist bei mir das ganze Jahr
- 2025: Chaos im Kopf (with Le Shuuk)
- 2025: Bux Bunni (with Julian Sommer)
