= Oliver Geissen =

German television presenter (born 1969)

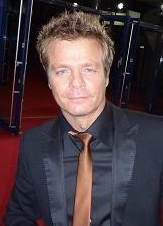
- Oliver Geissen in 2012
- Born: Oliver Geissen; 21 August 1969 (age 57); Hamburg, Germany
- Occupation: Television presenter
- Spouse: Christina Plate
- Children: 3

Oliver Geissen (born 21 August 1969) is a German television presenter. He was born in Hamburg. From 1999 to 2009, he was talk show host in Die Oliver Geissen Show on German broadcaster RTL. He also presents the music show Die ultimative Chartshow on RTL.

He married twice. In 2009, he married German actress Christina Plate. He has three sons.
