= Archbishop of St. Angela Gymnasium =

Coordinates: 51°07′15″N 7°24′55″E

Archdiocese Gymnasium St. Angela
- Erzbischöfliches St.-Angela-Gymnasium
- Wipperfürth, NRW; Germany

Information
- Type: Catholic Gymnasium
- Website: Home page

Archdiocese Gymnasium St. Angela is a German catholic Gymnasium located in Wipperfürth, North Rhine-Westphalia.

== School life ==
The school has the "voluntary instruction" sports promotion program for students in years 5 and 6. The program is set up to improve posture, endurance and coordination. Advanced movement skills and improving physical performance to support the healthy emotional and social development of the child.

The school offers regular field trips. It is successful in competitions in art, Latin and sports and supports charitable causes.

== Notable people ==
- Sebastian Wurth, season 8 participant of Deutschland sucht den Superstar.
