= Deutschland sucht den Superstar season 8 =

Season of television series

Deutschland sucht den Superstar
- Season 8
- Hosted by: Marco Schreyl
- Judges: Dieter Bohlen; Fernanda Brandão; Patrick Nuo
- Winner: Pietro Lombardi
- Runner-up: Sarah Engels

Release
- Original network: RTL
- Original release: 8 January – 7 May 2011

Season chronology
- ← Previous; Season 7 Next → Season 9

The eighth season of Deutschland sucht den Superstar was broadcast on German channel RTL from 8 January to 7 May 2011. The winner got a recording contract with Universal Music Group. For the first time there was a prize money of 500,000 Euros. Nina Eichinger and Volker Neumüller were removed from the panel and were replaced by Fernanda Brandão and Patrick Nuo. Marco Schreyl returned as the host. DSDS has extended participation privileges to Austria and Switzerland. Pietro Lombardi won the competition.

Sixty people were injured on 27 March in a stampede when a large crowd showed up for an autograph session with this season's participants at CentrO in Oberhausen. More than two dozen people were hospitalized. The victims of the injuries were between 12 and 17 years old and injuries include broken bones, shock, and loss of consciousness. Emergency treatment tents to handle the crowd. The organizers were only expecting 5,000 fans to show up, but an estimated 19,000 people attended. There were no charges laid after the investigation was completed in July.

== Controversies ==
The Hamburger Morgenpost questioned whether RTL misquoted DSDS Top 10 candidate Anna-Carina Woitschack. In an interview, Anna-Carina was quoted as saying "It was cut together all wrong. I never said that I hate Sarah - but on the contrary, I do not hate Sarah Engels. That is what I said. But it was cut this way by RTL, because it looks good for the show."

RTL received a statement from the Office of Public Safety stating that Sebastian Wurth was not allowed to participate after 10 pm. RTL was also fined €15,000 for the incident.

The Hamburger Morgenpost questioned whether the live shows were actually live broadcast. In the third "Mottoshow", Marco Angelini slipped up in his performance and forgot to sing at the correct time.

Pietro Lombardi's brother posted nude picture of Sarah Engels after she used Pietro's cell phone to talk to girls. The hardcore fans of Pietro Lombardi told his brother Marco about this and he was not happy about this. So, he decided to take "revenge". Pietro's brother also wrote "Everyone knows how cheap Sarah Engels is. She is sneaky. A liar."

DSDS host Marco Schreyl mixed up the phone numbers for candidates Zazou Mall and Marco Angelini. A camera shot of Marco Angelini showed him enraged towards the lens. A reporter for the Hamburger Morgenpost, who was present, reported there were chaotic scenes shortly before the end of the recording. Dieter Bohlen mentioned the mistake and Marco Schreyl replied that "It could be made easier for the host". RTL decided that no candidate would be eliminated and the final show has been pushed back a week and is now scheduled to air on 7 May.

On the sixth Mottoshow, Sarah Engels had two wardrobe incidents, when dancing to "Walking on Sunshine", where she began dancing too close to one of the cameras, causing two upskirts. This was eventually shown to the studio audience during the recap of her performance and was noted by the judges.

== Auditions ==
As with season 7, an audition truck, in which the candidates can qualify for the televised auditions, stopped in various cities in Germany, Austria and Switzerland between August 2010 and October 2010. Open auditions took place in September 2010 in Cologne, Munich, Hamburg and Berlin. 34,956 people auditioned throughout the 35 cities that hosted auditions. 135 candidates advanced to the Recall. Menderes Bagci, who failed in the auditions in the previous 7 seasons, advanced to the recall.

== "Recall" ==
The first "recall" show aired on 2 February. The 135 candidates who advanced to the Recall were split up into groups where the judges picked 60 candidates for the next round. The 60 candidates who advanced participated in groups and duets. Nico Raecke, who originally was one of the participants advancing to the Top 35, was thrown out of Deutschland sucht den Superstar because of his arrest for robbery and assault. Menderes Bagci was one of the candidates eliminated on 5 February Recall show. The Top 35 went to the Maldives.

== Finalists ==
(Ages stated at time of contest)

Contestant	Age	Hometown	Voted off	Liveshow theme
Pietro Lombardi	18	Karlsruhe	Winner	Grand Finale
Sarah Engels	18	Hürth	26 February 2011; 7 May 2011	Megahits; Grand Finale
Ardian Bujupi	19	Heidelberg	30 April 2011	Semifinal
Marco Angelini	26	Graf, Austria	23 April 2011	Pop, Rock and Discofever
Sebastian Wurth	16	Wipperfürth	16 April 2011	Hits of the 80's, 90's, and Today
Zazou Mall	26	Zurich, Switzerland	9 April 2011	America vs Europe
Norman Langen	25	Übach-Palenberg	19 March 2011	Party Hits
Anna-Carina Woitschack	18	Kamern	12 March 2011	Spring Feelings
Nina Richel	17	Hildesheim	Disqualified	
Marvin Cybulski	30	Hannover	5 March 2011	Apres-Ski Hits

== "Die Top 15 – Jetzt oder nie" (The Top 15 – Now or Never) ==
Original airdate: 19 February 2011

Contestants	Song (Artist)	Percentage of calls
Zazou Mall	One Love (Estelle & David Guetta)	6,1% (8/15)
Sebastian Wurth	Home (Michael Bublé)	12,3% (3/15)
Nina Richel	There You'll Be (Faith Hill)	3,2 (10/15)
Norman Langen	Ich Bau Dir Ein Schloss (Jürgen Drews)	8,5% (5/15)
Awa Corrah	Only Girl (In The World) (Rihanna)	1,8% (15/15)
Ardian Bujupi	Sway (Michael Bublé)	9,7% (4/15)
Nicole Kandziora	Firework (Katy Perry)	2,1% (14/15)
Mike Müller	Show Me the Meaning of Being Lonely (Backstreet Boys)	2,8% (11/15)
Anna-Carina Woitschack	If I Ain't Got You (Alicia Keys)	8,4% (6/15)
Christopher Schwab	Hey There Delilah (The Plain White T's)	2,6% (12/15)
Marco Angelini	Stark (Ich + Ich)	7,1% (7/15)
Felix Hahnsch	The Man Who Can't Be Moved (The Script)	2,6% (13/15)
Pietro Lombardi	Billionaire (Bruno Mars & Travie McCoy)	12,7% (2/15)
Marvin Cybulski	Midnight Lady (Chris Norman)	14,0% (1/15)
Sarah Engels	One Moment in Time (Whitney Houston)	6,1% (9/15)

Advancing to Top 10 (Public votes): Norman, Marvin, Marco, Sebastian, Pietro, Ardian, Anna-Carina

Advancing to Top 10 (Jury selection): Sarah, Zazou, Nina

== "Mottoshows" (theme shows) ==
=== Top 10 - "Megahits" ===
Original airdate: 26 February 2011

Contestants	Song (Artist)	Percentage of calls
Marco Angelini	Dance with Somebody (Mando Diao)	8,0% (7/10)
Zazou Mall	Don't Stop the Music (Rihanna)	11,0% (4/10)
Nina Richel	Breakaway (Kelly Clarkson)	7,4% (8/10)
Ardian Bujupi	In My Head (Jason Derülo)	9,3% (5/10)
Norman Langen	Wahnsinn (Wolfgang Petry)	7,1% (9/10)
Sarah Engels	When You Believe (Mariah Carey ft. Whitney Houston)	6,8% (10/10)
Sebastian Wurth	You Raise Me Up (Westlife)	15,9% (1/10)
Pietro Lombardi	With You (Chris Brown)	14,3% (2/10)
Anna-Carina Woitschack	I Will Always Love You (Whitney Houston)	9,0 (6/10)
Marvin Cybulski	We've Got Tonight (Kenny Rogers)	11,1% (3/10)

- Jury Elimination Forecast: Nina Richel or Zazou Mall (Dieter & Fernanda), Nina Richel (Patrick)
- Bottom 3: Nina Richel, Norman Langen & Sarah Engels
- Eliminated: Sarah Engels

=== Top 9 - "Apres-Ski Hits" ===
Original airdate: 5 March 2011

Contestants	Song (Artist)	Percentage of calls
Norman Langen	Ein Stern (...der deinen Namen trägt) (DJ Ötzi & Nik P.)	10,3% (6/9)
Zazou Mall	Born This Way (Lady Gaga)	10,8% (4/9)
Nina Richel	Everytime We Touch (Cascada)	13,1% (2/9)
Marco Angelini	Fliegerlied (Zillertaler Dirndljäger)	10,3% (5/9)
Sebastian Wurth	Ich war noch niemals in New York (Sportfreunde Stiller)	11,8% (3/9)
Anna-Carina Woitschack	I Will Survive (Gloria Gaynor)	10,05 (7/9)
Marvin Cybulski	1000 und 1 Nacht (Zoom!) (Klaus Lage)	7,4% (9/9)
Ardian Bujupi	Tonight (I'm Lovin' You) (Enrique Iglesias)	8,6% (8/9)
Pietro Lombardi	Freaky Like Me (Madcon)	17,2% (1/9)

- Jury Elimination Forecast: Nina Richel (Dieter & Patrick), Norman Langen or Nina Richel (Fernanda)
- Bottom 3: Anna-Carina Woitschack, Ardian Bujupi & Marvin Cybulski
- Eliminated: Marvin Cybulski

=== Top 8 - "Frühlings Gefühle" (Spring Feelings) ===
Original airdate: 12 March 2011

Contestants	Song (Artist)	Percentage of calls
Zazou Mall	Umbrella (Rihanna)	8,9% (6/8)
Ardian Bujupi	Grenade (Bruno Mars)	10,7% (4/8)
Marco Angelini	Shame (Robbie Williams ft. Gary Barlow)	10,4% (5/8)
Norman Langen	Verlieben, Verloren, Vergessen, Verzeihen (Wolfgang Petry)	8,0% (7/8)
Sebastian Wurth	You Don't Know (Milow)	12,6% (3/8)
Anna-Carina Woitschack	Für Dich (Yvonne Catterfeld)	6,8% (8/8)
Pietro Lombardi	Down (Jay Sean)	16,6% (2/8)
Sarah Engels	I Wanna Dance With Somebody (Whitney Houston)	26,0% (1/8)

- Jury Elimination Forecast: Ardian Bujupi or Zazou Mall (Dieter), Ardian Bujupi (Fernanda), Can't Decide (Patrick)
- Bottom 3: Zazou Mall, Norman Langen & Anna-Carina Woitschack
- Eliminated: Anna-Carina Woitschack

=== Top 7 - "Party Kracher" (Party Hits) ===
Original airdate: 19 March 2011

Contestants	Song (Artist)	Percentage of calls
Marco Angelini	Let Me Entertain You (Robbie Williams)	10,4% (6/7)
Norman Langen	Hey! Baby (DJ Ötzi)	9,2% (7/7)
Ardian Bujupi	Beautiful Monster (Ne-Yo)	12,7% (4/7)
Zazou Mall	Hot n Cold (Katy Perry)	16,3% (3/7)
Sebastian Wurth	Monsta (Culcha Candela)	12,1% (5/7)
Pietro Lombardi	Que Sera, Sera (Whatever Will Be, Will Be) (Hermes House Band)	22,0% (1/7)
Sarah Engels	Release Me (Agnes)	17,3% (2/7)

- Jury Elimination Forecast: Zazou Mall or Norman Langen (Dieter, Fernanda & Patrick)
- Bottom 3: Sebastian Wurth, Marco Angelini & Norman Langen
- Eliminated: Norman Langen

=== Top 6 - "English & German Hits" ===
Original airdate: 2 April 2011

Contestants	Song (Artist)	Percentage of calls
Sebastian Wurth	Du trägst keine Liebe in Dir (Echt)	13,8%
Sebastian Wurth	Wonderful Life (Hurts)	13,8%
Marco Angelini	Vom selben Stern (Ich & Ich)	9,2%
Marco Angelini	Wonderwall (Oasis)	9,2%
Zazou Mall	Stadt (Cassandra Steen feat. Adel Tawil)	12,9%
Zazou Mall	Fight for This Love (Cheryl Cole)	12,9%
Ardian Bujupi	Dieser Weg (Xavier Naidoo)	15,1%
Ardian Bujupi	Feel (Robbie Williams)	15,1%
Sarah Engels	Symphonie (Silbermond)	20,6%
Sarah Engels	Run (Leona Lewis)	20,6%
Pietro Lombardi	Mein Stern (Ayman)	28,4%
Pietro Lombardi	Every Breath You Take (Sting)	28,4%

- Jury Elimination Forecast: Zazou Mall, Marco Angelini
- No elimination after wrong televoting numbers were announced for Zazou and Marco.

=== Top 6 - "America vs Europe" ===
Original airdate: 9 April 2011

Contestants	Song (Artist)	Percentage of calls
Sebastian Wurth	You and Me (In My Pocket) (Milow)	14,0% (4/6)
Sebastian Wurth	Hallelujah (Rufus Wainwright)	14,0% (4/6)
Ardian Bujupi	Glow (Madcon)	16,0% (3/6)
Ardian Bujupi	I Need A Dollar (Aloe Blacc)	16,0% (3/6)
Zazou Mall	A Night like This (Caro Emerald)	13,6% (6/6)
Zazou Mall	Waka Waka (This Time For Africa) (Shakira)	13,6% (6/6)
Marco Angelini	Der Kommissar (Falco)	13,7% (5/6)
Marco Angelini	Use Somebody (Kings Of Leon)	13,7% (5/6)
Sarah Engels	Walking on Sunshine (Katrina And The Waves)	17,8% (2/6)
Sarah Engels	Hurt (Christina Aguilera)	17,8% (2/6)
Pietro Lombardi	Don't Worry, Be Happy (Hermes House Band)	24,9% (1/6)
Pietro Lombardi	Mad World (Tears for Fears)	24,9% (1/6)

- Jury Elimination Forecast: Marco Angelini or Zazou Mall
- Bottom 2: Marco Angelini & Zazou Mall
- Eliminated: Zazou Mall

=== Top 5 - "Hits of the 80's, 90's, and Today" ===
Original airdate: 16 April 2011

Contestants	Song (Artist)	Percentage of calls
Sebastian Wurth	Ayo Technology (Milow)	15,3% (5/5)
Sebastian Wurth	I Promised Myself (Nick Kamen)	15,3% (5/5)
Sebastian Wurth	Mandy (Westlife)	15,3% (5/5)
Ardian Bujupi	We've Got It Goin' On (Backstreet Boys)	16,1% (4/5)
Ardian Bujupi	More (Usher)	16,1% (4/5)
Ardian Bujupi	(I Just) Died in Your Arms (Cutting Crew)	16,1% (4/5)
Marco Angelini	Hollywood Hills (Sunrise Avenue)	18,6% (3/5)
Marco Angelini	Fly Away (Lenny Kravitz)	18,6% (3/5)
Marco Angelini	Major Tom (Coming Home) (Peter Schilling)	18,6% (3/5)
Sarah Engels	The Best (Tina Turner)	26,5% (1/5)
Sarah Engels	What a Feeling (Irene Cara)	26,5% (1/5)
Sarah Engels	Footprints in the Sand (Leona Lewis)	26,5% (1/5)
Pietro Lombardi	I Just Called to Say I Love You (Stevie Wonder)	23,5% (2/5)
Pietro Lombardi	To Make You Feel My Love (Kris Allen)	23,5% (2/5)
Pietro Lombardi	Sweat (A La La La La Long) (Inner Circle)	23,5% (2/5)

- Jury Elimination Forecast: —
- Bottom 2: Ardian Bujupi & Sebastian Wurth
- Eliminated: Sebastian Wurth

=== Top 4 - "Pop, Rock and Discofever" ===
Original airdate: 23 April 2011

Contestants	Song (Artist)	Percentage of calls
Marco Angelini	Angels (Robbie Williams)	18,4% (4/4)
Marco Angelini	How You Remind Me (Nickelback)	18,4% (4/4)
Marco Angelini	Born to Be Alive (Patrick Hernandez)	18,4% (4/4)
Ardian Bujupi	Here Without You (3 Doors Down)	23,0% (3/4)
Ardian Bujupi	Fairytale (Alexander Rybak)	23,0% (3/4)
Ardian Bujupi	Sex Machine (James Brown)	23,0% (3/4)
Pietro Lombardi	You Are Not Alone (Michael Jackson)	30,9% (1/4)
Pietro Lombardi	Just a Gigolo (David Lee Roth)	30,9% (1/4)
Pietro Lombardi	Gimme Hope Jo'anna (Eddy Grant)	30,9% (1/4)
Sarah Engels	I'm So Excited (The Pointer Sisters)	28,0% (2/4)
Sarah Engels	Eye of the Tiger (Survivor)	28,0% (2/4)
Sarah Engels	A Moment Like This (Kelly Clarkson)	28,0% (2/4)

- Jury Elimination Forecast: Marco Angelini (Patrick Nuo), Pietro Lombardi (Fernanda Brandão), No one (Dieter Bohlen)
- Bottom 2: Marco Angelini & Sarah Engels
- Eliminated: Marco Angelini

=== Top 3 - Semifinal ===
Original airdate: 30 April 2011

Contestants	Song (Artist)	Percentage of calls
Ardian Bujupi	Wavin' Flag (K'naan)	27.3% (3/3)
Ardian Bujupi	Loving You Is Killing Me (Aloe Blacc)	27.3% (3/3)
Ardian Bujupi	Feeling Good (Michael Bublé)	27.3% (3/3)
Sarah Engels	L ady Marmalade (Christina Aguilera, Pink, Lil' Kim & Mýa)	37,3% (1/3)
Sarah Engels	One Day in Your Life (Anastacia)	37,3% (1/3)
Sarah Engels	Beautiful (Christina Aguilera)	37,3% (1/3)
Pietro Lombardi	Can You Feel the Love Tonight (Elton John)	35,4 (2/3)
Pietro Lombardi	Wenn Das Liebe Ist (Glashaus)	35,4 (2/3)
Pietro Lombardi	Mambo No. 5 (Lou Bega)	35,4 (2/3)

- Jury Elimination Forecast: Can't Decide
- Bottom 2: Pietro Lombardi & Ardian Bujupi
- Eliminated: Ardian Bujupi

=== Top 2 - Final (Contestant's Choice, Highlight Song & Winner's Single) ===
Original airdate: 7 May 2010

Contestant	Song (Artist)	Percentage of calls
Sarah Engels	How Will I Know (Whitney Houston)	48,1% (2/2)
Sarah Engels	Run (Leona Lewis)	48,1% (2/2)
Sarah Engels	Call My Name (Winner's Single by Dieter Bohlen)	48,1% (2/2)
Pietro Lombardi	Dance with My Father (Luther Vandross)	51,9% (1/2)
Pietro Lombardi	Que Sera, Sera (Whatever Will Be, Will Be) (Hermes House Band)	51,9% (1/2)
Pietro Lombardi	Call My Name (Winner's Single by Dieter Bohlen)	51,9% (1/2)

- Judges' forecasts of who would win: Sarah Engels (Patrick), Pietro Lombardi (Fernanda & Dieter)
- Winner: Pietro Lombardi
- Runner-Up: Sarah Engels

== Group song ==
- Top 15: "Higher" by Taio Cruz ft. Kylie Minogue
- Top 10: "Club Can't Handle Me" by Flo Rida ft. David Guetta
- Top 9: "The Time (Dirty Bit)" by The Black Eyed Peas
- Top 8: "Turn Around (5, 4, 3, 2, 1)" by Flo Rida
- Top 7: "Yeah 3x" by Chris Brown
- Top 6: "On The Floor" by Jennifer Lopez ft. Pitbull
- Top 6: "Who's That Chick" by David Guetta ft. Rihanna
- Top 5: "I Gotta Feeling" by The Black Eyed Peas
- Top 4: "Crying at the Discoteque" by Alcazar
- Top 3: "When Love Takes Over" by David Guetta ft. Kelly Rowland
- Top 2: "We've Got Tonight" by Ronan Keating ft. Jeanette Biedermann
  "The Time (Dirty Bit)" by Black Eyed Peas
  Top 10: "Higher" by the Taio Cruz ft. Kylie Minogue (without Pietro and Sarah)

== Elimination chart ==
Legend
Did Not Perform	Female	Male	Top 15	Top 10	Winner

Safe	Safe First	Safe Last	Judges' Choice	Eliminated

Stage:		Top 15	Finals									
Week:		2/19	2/26	3/5	3/12	3/19	4/2	4/9	4/16	4/23	4/30	5/7
Place	Contestant	Result										
1	Pietro Lombardi	2nd 12.7%	2nd 14.3%	1st 17.2%	2nd 16.6%	1st 22.0%	1st 28.4%	1st 24.9%	2nd 23.5%	1st 30.0%	2nd 35.4%	Winner; 51.9%
2	Sarah Engels	9th 6.1%	10th 6.7%		1st 26.0%	2nd 17.3%	2nd 20.6%	2nd 17.8%	1st 26.5%	2nd 28.9%	1st 37.3%	Runner-Up; 48.1%
3	Ardian Bujupi	4th 9.7%	5th 9.6%	8th 8.6%	4th 10.7%	4th 12.7%	3rd 15.1%	3rd 16.0%	4th 16.1%	3rd 23.0%	3rd 27.3%	
4	Marco Angelini	7th 7.1%	7th 8.0%	5th 10.3%	5th 10.5%	6th 10.4%	6th 9.2%	5th 13.7%	3rd 18.6%	4th 18.4%		
5	Sebastian Wurth	3rd 12.3%	1st 15.8%	3rd 11.8%	3rd 12.6%	5th 12.1%	4th 13.8%	4th 14.0%	5th 15.3%			
6	Zazou Mall	8th 6.1%	4th 11.0%	4th 10.8%	6th 8.8%	3rd 16.3%	5th 12.9%	6th 13.6%				
7	Norman Langen	5th 8.5%	9th 7.1%	6th 10.3%	7th 8.0%	7th 9.2%						
8	Anna-Carina Woitschack	6th 8.4%	6th 9.0%	7th 10.0%	8th 6.8%							
9	Nina Richel	10th 3.2%	8th 7.4%	2nd 13.5%	DQ							
10	Marvin Cybulski	1st 14.0%	3rd 11.1%	9th 7.5%								
11	Mike Müller	11th 2.8%										
12	Christopher Schwab	12th 2.6%										
13	Felix Hahnsch	13th 2.6%										
14	Nicole Kandziora	14th 2.1%										
15	Awa Corrah	15th 1.8%										

- On 19 February it was intended that the viewers would choose 7 and the judges 3 finalists. The judges, or mostly Dieter Bohlen, however chose not to decide and therefore the three people with the next highest votes made it through to the finals automatically. They were Sarah Engels, Zazou Mall and Nina Richel.
- On 10 March, Nina Richel was taken out of the competition due to her numerous breakdowns. It was stated that she withdrew, however as it turned out RTL took Richel out against her will. She was replaced by Sarah Engels who returned after a one-week absence since her original elimination - finishing 2nd instead of 10th, Engels became the most successful replacement candidate in the history of the show.
- On 2 April RTL switched the numbers of Zazou Mall and Marco Angelini several times during the recap. The voting was therefore stopped at the beginning of the results and it was announced that no one would get eliminated that week and that the series will be extended with a one-week delay for the final. All votes that came in before the first mistake, were included in the result of the following week, people who called later got a refund.

== Top 10 candidates ==
=== Pietro Lombardi ===
Pietro Lombardi (born in Karlsruhe).

Show (Original airdate)	Song (Artist)	Percentage of calls
Top 15 (19 February 2011)	"Billionaire" (Bruno Mars & Travie McCoy)	12,7% (2/15)
Top 10 (26 February 2011)	"With You" (Chris Brown)	14,3% (2/10)
Top 9 (5 March 2011)	"Freaky Like Me" (Madcon)	17,2% (1/9)
Top 8 (12 March 2011)	"Down" (Jay Sean)	16,6% (2/8)
Top 7 (19 March 2011)	"Que Sera, Sera (Whatever Will Be, Will Be)" (Hermes House Band)	22,0% (1/7)
Top 6 (2 April 2011)	Mein Stern (Ayman)	28,4%
Top 6 (2 April 2011)	Every Breath You Take (Sting)	28,4%
Top 6 (9 April 2011)	Don't Worry, Be Happy (Hermes House Band)	24,9% (1/6)
Top 6 (9 April 2011)	Mad World (Tears for Fears)	24,9% (1/6)
Top 5 (16 April 2011)	I Just Called to Say I Love You (Stevie Wonder)	23,5% (2/5)
Top 5 (16 April 2011)	To Make You Feel My Love (Kris Allen)	23,5% (2/5)
Top 5 (16 April 2011)	Sweat (A La La La La Long) (Inner Circle)	23,5% (2/5)
Top 4 (23 April 2011)	You Are Not Alone (Michael Jackson)	30,0% (1/4)
Top 4 (23 April 2011)	Just a Gigolo (David Lee Roth)	30,0% (1/4)
Top 4 (23 April 2011)	Gimme Hope Jo'anna (Eddy Grant)	30,0% (1/4)
Top 3 (30 April 2011)	Can You Feel the Love Tonight (Elton John)	35,4% (2/3)
Top 3 (30 April 2011)	Wenn das Liebe ist (Glashaus)	35,4% (2/3)
Top 3 (30 April 2011)	Mambo No. 5 (Lou Bega)	35,4% (2/3)
Top 2 (7 May 2011)	Dance with My Father (Luther Vandross)	51,9% (1/2)
Top 2 (7 May 2011)	Que Sera, Sera (Whatever Will Be, Will Be) (Hermes House Band)	51,9% (1/2)
Top 2 (7 May 2011)	Call My Name (Winner's Single by Dieter Bohlen)	51,9% (1/2)

=== Sarah Engels ===
Sarah Engels was born in Cologne on 15 October 1992. She had been taking vocal lessons for four years before participating in DSDS and took part in street festivals on many occasions. She was also on DSDS in season 6 where she was eliminated in the recall after a duet with Eugen Flittner. She was eliminated in the Top 10. However, on 10 March, Nina Richel had to leave DSDS as a result of bad health conditions, which resulted in Engels taking her place.

Show (Original airdate)	Song (Artist)	Percentage of calls
Top 15 (19 February 2011)	"One Moment In Time" (Whitney Houston)	6,1% (9/15)
Top 10 (26 February 2011)	"When You Believe" (Mariah Carey ft. Whitney Houston)	6,7% (10/10)
Top 8 (12 March 2011)	"I Wanna Dance With Somebody" (Whitney Houston)	26,0% (1/8)
Top 7 (19 March 2011)	"Release Me" (Agnes)	17,3% (2/7)
Top 6 (2 April 2011)	Symphonie (Silbermond)	20,6%
Top 6 (2 April 2011)	Run (Leona Lewis)	20,6%
Top 6 (9 April 2011)	Walking on Sunshine (Katrina And The Waves)	17,8% (2/6)
Top 6 (9 April 2011)	Hurt (Christina Aguilera)	17,8% (2/6)
Top 5 (16 April 2011)	The Best (Tina Turner)	26,5% (1/5)
Top 5 (16 April 2011)	What a Feeling (Irene Cara)	26,5% (1/5)
Top 5 (16 April 2011)	Footprints in the Sand (Leona Lewis)	26,5% (1/5)
Top 4 (23 April 2011)	I'm So Excited (The Pointer Sisters)	28,9% (2/4)
Top 4 (23 April 2011)	Eye of the Tiger (Survivor)	28,9% (2/4)
Top 4 (23 April 2011)	A Moment Like This (Kelly Clarkson)	28,9% (2/4)
Top 3 (30 April 2011)	One Day in Your Life (Anastacia)	37,3% (1/3)
Top 3 (30 April 2011)	Lady Marmalade (Christina Aguilera, Pink, Lil' Kim & Mýa)	37,3% (1/3)
Top 3 (30 April 2011)	Beautiful (Christina Aguilera)	37,3% (1/3)
Top 2 (7 May 2011)	How Will I Know (Whitney Houston)	48,1% (2/2)
Top 2 (7 May 2011)	Run (Leona Lewis)	48,1% (2/2)
Top 2 (7 May 2011)	Call My Name (Winner's Single by Dieter Bohlen)	48,1% (2/2)

=== Ardian Bujupi ===
Ardian Bujupi was born in Pristina, Yugoslavia and lives in Heidelberg today.

Show (Original airdate)	Song (Artist)	Percentage of calls
Top 15 (19 February 2011)	"Sway" (Michael Bublé)	9,7% (4/15)
Top 10 (26 February 2011)	"In My Head" (Jason Derulo)	9,6% (5/10)
Top 9 (5 March 2011)	"Tonight (I'm Lovin' You)" (Enrique Iglesias)	8,6% (8/9)
Top 8 (12 March 2011)	"Grenade" (Bruno Mars)	10,7% (4/8)
Top 7 (19 March 2011)	"Beautiful Monster" (Ne-Yo)	12,7% (4/7)
Top 6 (2 April 2011)	Dieser Weg (Xavier Naidoo)	15,1%
Top 6 (2 April 2011)	Feel (Robbie Williams)	15,1%
Top 6 (9 April 2011)	Glow (Madcon)	16,0% (3/6)
Top 6 (9 April 2011)	I Need A Dollar (Aloe Blacc)	16,0% (3/6)
Top 5 (16 April 2011)	We've Got It Goin' On (Backstreet Boys)	16,1% (4/5)
Top 5 (16 April 2011)	More (Usher)	16,1% (4/5)
Top 5 (16 April 2011)	(I Just) Died in Your Arms (Cutting Crew)	16,1% (4/5)
Top 4 (23 April 2011)	Here Without You (3 Doors Down)	23,0% (3/4)
Top 4 (23 April 2011)	Fairytale (Alexander Rybak)	23,0% (3/4)
Top 4 (23 April 2011)	Sex Machine (James Brown)	23,0% (3/4)
Top 3 (30 April 2011)	Loving You Is Killing Me (Aloe Blacc)	27,3% (3/3)
Top 3 (30 April 2011)	Feeling Good (Michael Bublé)	27,3% (3/3)
Top 3 (30 April 2011)	Wavin' Flag (K'naan)	27,3% (3/3)

=== Marco Angelini ===
Marco Angelini (born in Voitsberg, Austria). He completed his medical study shortly after the casting and is going to write his thesis after his departure from DSDS. He also planned to write a book about his time at the casting show and his impressions of it. He is lead singer of the Austrian-based rock band Black Balloon.

Show (Original airdate)	Song (Artist)	Percentage of calls
Top 15 (19 February 2011)	"Stark" (Ich + Ich)	7,1% (7/15)
Top 10 (26 February 2011)	"Dance With Somebody" (Mando Diao)	8,0% (7/10)
Top 9 (5 March 2011)	"Fliegerlied" (Zillertaler Dirndljäger)	10,3% (5/9)
Top 8 (12 March 2011)	"Shame" (Robbie Williams ft. Gary Barlow)	10,5% (5/8)
Top 7 (19 March 2011)	"Let Me Entertain You" (Robbie Williams)	10,4% (6/7)
Top 6 (2 April 2011)	Vom selben Stern (Ich & Ich)	9,2%
Top 6 (2 April 2011)	Wonderwall (song) (Oasis)	9,2%
Top 6 (9 April 2011)	Der Kommissar (Falco)	13,7% (5/6)
Top 6 (9 April 2011)	Use Somebody (Kings Of Leon)	13,7% (5/6)
Top 5 (16 April 2011)	Hollywood Hills (Sunrise Avenue)	18,6% (3/5)
Top 5 (16 April 2011)	Fly Away (Lenny Kravitz)	18,6% (3/5)
Top 5 (16 April 2011)	Major Tom (Peter Schilling)	18,6% (3/5)
Top 4 (23 April 2011)	Angels (Robbie Williams)	18,4% (4/4)
Top 4 (23 April 2011)	How You Remind Me (Nickelback)	18,4% (4/4)
Top 4 (23 April 2011)	Born to Be Alive (Patrick Hernandez)	18,4% (4/4)

=== Sebastian Wurth ===
Sebastian Wurth was born in Wipperfürth on 24 July 1994. He is the youngest participant in this year's season. Dieter Bohlen saw great potential in him. Wurth is often compared with Justin Bieber because of their similar hair style. He is a fan of Bayern Munich.

Show (Original airdate)	Song (Artist)	Percentage of calls
Top 15 (19 February 2011)	"Home" (Michael Bublé)	12,3% (3/15)
Top 10 (26 February 2011)	"You Raise Me Up" (Westlife)	15,8% (1/10)
Top 9 (5 March 2011)	"Ich War Noch Niemals In New York" (Sportfreunde Stiller)	11,8% (3/9)
Top 8 (12 March 2011)	"You Don't Know" (Milow)	12,6% (3/8)
Top 7 (19 March 2011)	"Monsta" (Culcha Candela)	12,1% (5/7)
Top 6.1 (2 April 2011)	Du trägst keine Liebe in Dir (Echt)	13,8%
Top 6.1 (2 April 2011)	Wonderful Life (Hurts)	13,8%
Top 6.2 (9 April 2011)	You and Me (In My Pocket) (Milow)	14,0% (4/6)
Top 6.2 (9 April 2011)	Hallelujah (Rufus Wainwright)	14,0% (4/6)
Top 5 (16 April 2011)	Ayo Technology (Milow)	15,3%(5/5)
Top 5 (16 April 2011)	I Promised Myself (Nick Kamen)	15,3%(5/5)
Top 5 (16 April 2011)	Mandy (Westlife)	15,3%(5/5)

=== Zazou Mall ===
Zazou Mall (Born in Zürich, Switzerland)

Show (Original airdate)	Song (Artist)	Percentage of calls
Top 15 (19 February 2011)	"One Love" (Estelle & David Guetta)	6,1% (8/15)
Top 10 (26 February 2011)	"Don't Stop the Music" (Rihanna)	11,0% (4/10)
Top 9 (5 March 2011)	"Born This Way (Lady Gaga)	10,8% (4/9)
Top 8 (12 March 2011)	"Umbrella" (Rihanna)	8,8% (6/8)
Top 7 (19 March 2011)	"Hot n Cold" (Katy Perry)	16,3% (3/7)
Top 6 (2 April 2011)	"Stadt" (Cassandra Steen feat. Adel Tawil)	12,9%
Top 6 (2 April 2011)	"Fight for This Love" (Cheryl Cole)	12,9%
Top 6 (9 April 2011)	"A Night Like This" (Caro Emerald)	13,6% (6/6)
Top 6 (9 April 2011)	"Waka Waka (This Time for Africa)" (Shakira)	13,6% (6/6)

=== Norman Langen ===
Norman Langen was born in Badenberg on 7 March 1985. He likes to sing in German, and likes Schlager, pop and dance music. He is a trained welder but is retraining as a hospice nurse. He has previously sung in a boy band (BXess, later Manhattan). He has three sisters.

Show (Original airdate)	Song (Artist)	Percentage of calls
Top 15 (19 February 2011)	"Ich bau dir ein Schloss" (Jürgen Drews)	8,5% (5/15)
Top 10 (26 February 2011)	"Wahnsinn" (Wolfgang Petry)	7,1% (9/10)
Top 9 (5 March 2011)	"Ein Stern (...der deinen Namen trägt)" (DJ Ötzi & Nik P.)	10,3% (6/9)
Top 8 (12 March 2011)	"Verlieben, verloren, vergessen, verzeihen" (Wolfgang Petry)	8,0% (7/8)
Top 7 (19 March 2011)	"Hey! Baby" (DJ Ötzi)	9,2% (7/7)

=== Anna-Carina Woitschack ===
Anna-Carina Woitschack (born in Kamern).

Show (Original airdate)	Song (Artist)	Percentage of calls
Top 15 (19 February 2011)	"If I Ain't Got You" (Alicia Keys)	8,4% (6/15)
Top 10 (26 February 2011)	"I Will Always Love You" (Whitney Houston)	9,0% (6/10)
Top 9 (5 March 2011)	"I Will Survive" (Gloria Gaynor)	10,0% (7/9)
Top 8 (12 March 2011)	"Für Dich" (Yvonne Catterfeld)	6,8% (8/8)

=== Nina Richel ===
Nina Richel was born in Hildesheim. The then-17-year-old contestant has been eliminated by RTL chief Tom Sänger after the second "Mottoshow", allegedly for health reasons. Some days later she has told the whole story. After Sänger's decision Sarah Engels, not Marvin Cybulski, was invited for a comeback.

Show (Original airdate)	Song (Artist)	Percentage of calls
Top 15 (19 February 2011)	"There You'll Be" (Faith Hill)	3,2% (10/15)
Top 10 (26 February 2011)	"Breakaway" (Kelly Clarkson)	7,4% (8/10)
Top 9 (5 March 2011)	"Everytime We Touch" (Cascada)	13,5% (2/9)
Top 8 (12 March 2011)	Elimintated by Tom Sänger, not the voters.	—

=== Marvin Cybulski ===
Marvin Cybulski (born in Hanover).

Show (Original airdate)	Song (Artist)	Percentage of calls
Top 15 (19 February 2011)	"Midnight Lady" (Chris Norman)	14,0% (1/15)
Top 10 (26 February 2011)	"We've Got Tonight" (Kenny Rogers)	11,1% (3/10)
Top 9 (5 March 2011)	"1000 und 1 Nacht (Zoom!)" (Klaus Lage)	7,5% (9/9)
