= Norman Langen =

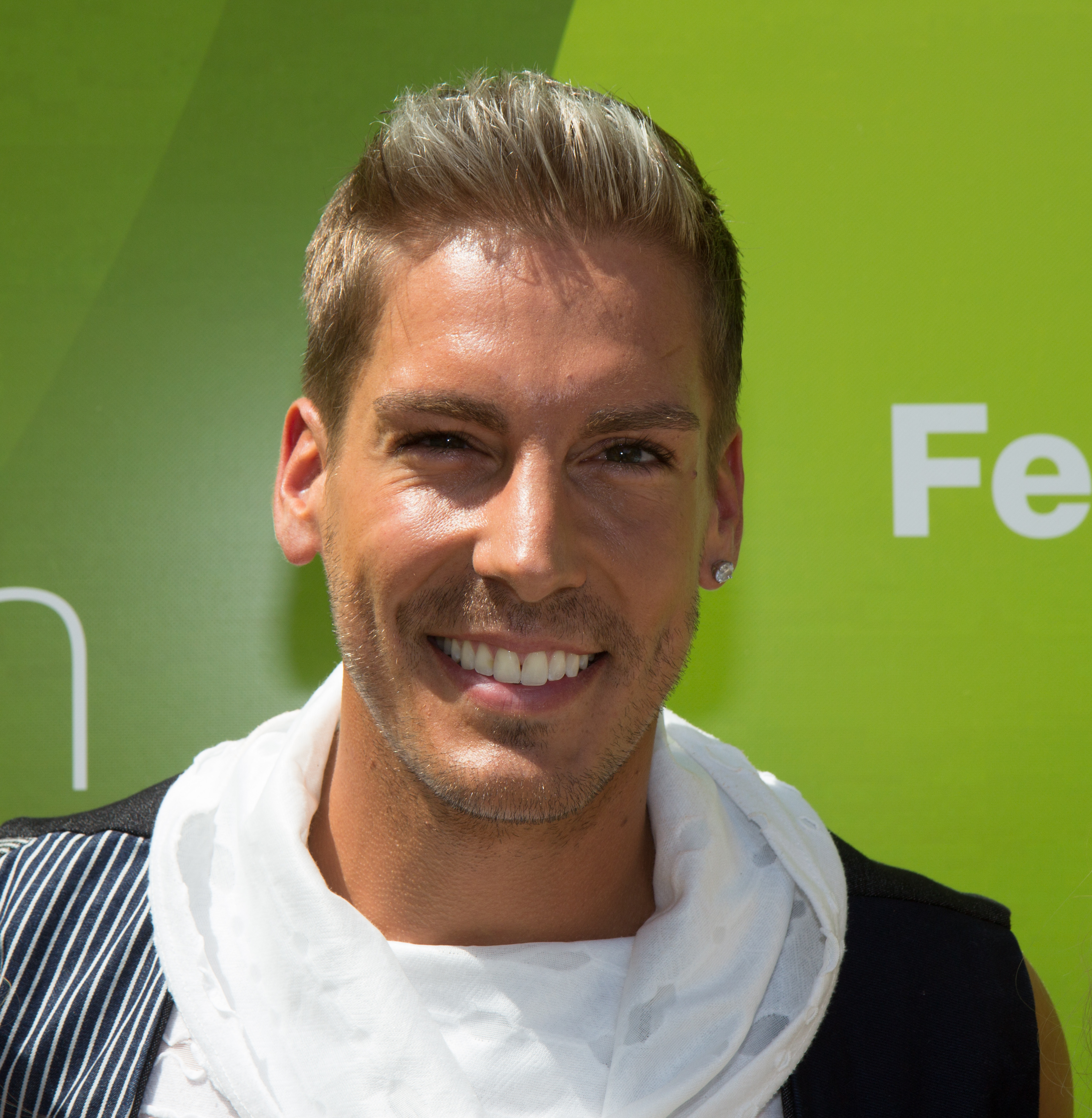
- Norman Langen, 2018

Background information
- Born: Norman Langen; 7 March 1985 (age 40); Bardenberg, Germany
- Occupation: Singer
- Years active: 2011–present

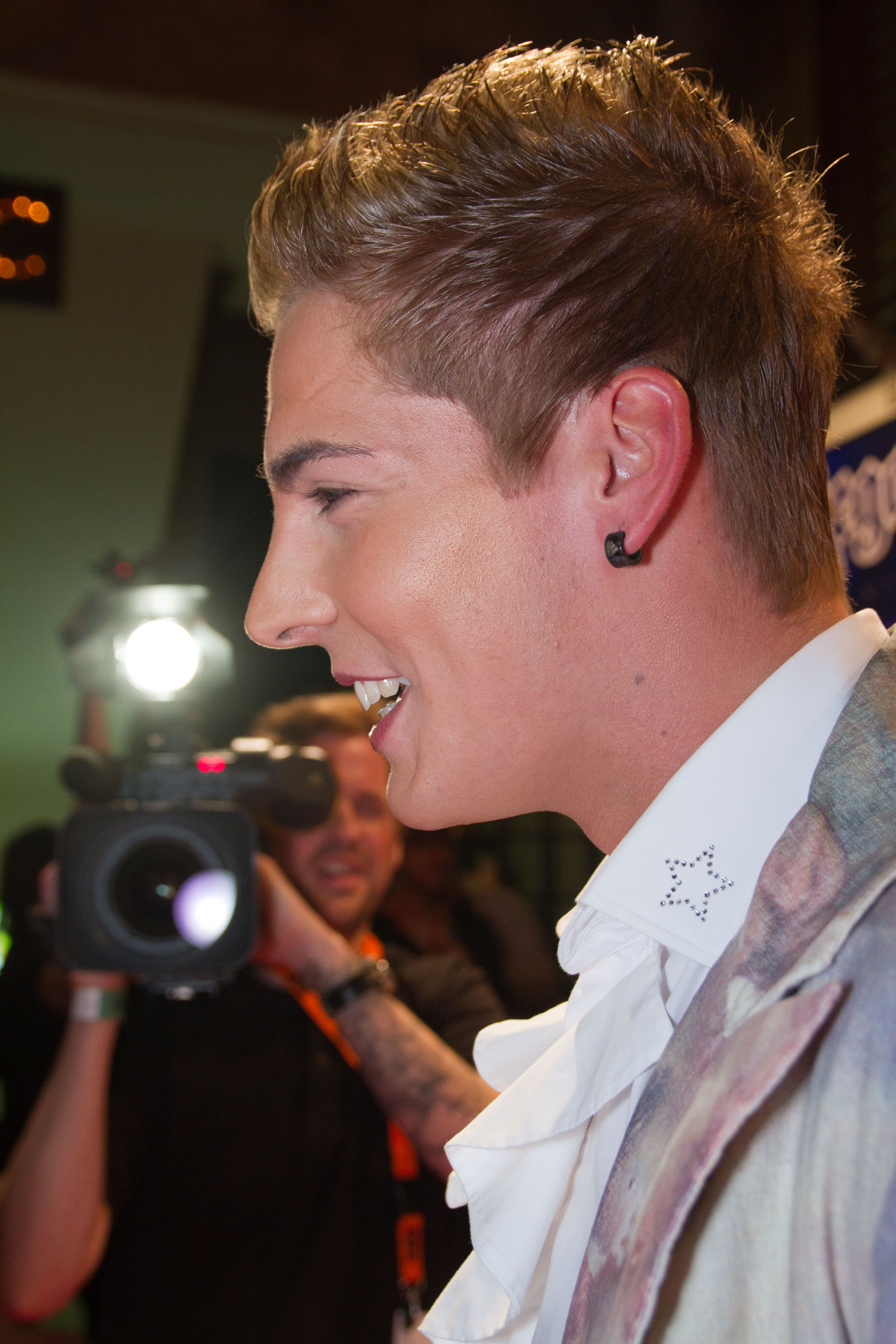
Norman Langen, "Mallorca Opening 2011", Megapark, Mallorca

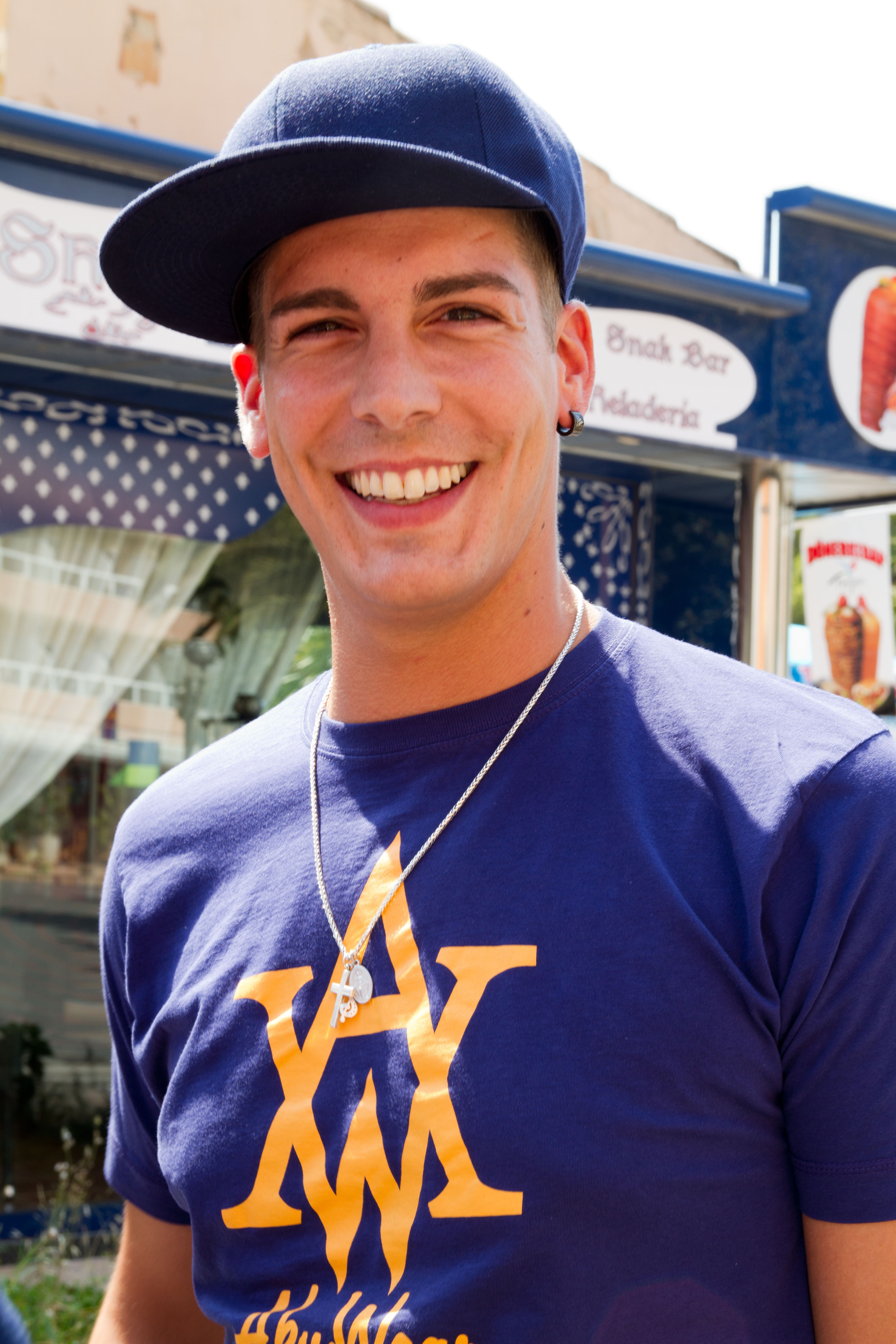
Norman Langen in Santa Ponsa, Mallorca

Norman Langen (born 7 March 1985 in Bardenberg, Germany) is a German singer and a participant in season 8 of Deutschland sucht den Superstar who finished in 7th place. He likes to sing in German. He likes Schlager, pop and dance music.

== Biography ==
=== Early life ===
He was born in Badenberg, Germany but currently lives in Übach-Palenberg, North Rhine-Westphalia. He is a trained welder. But he is retraining as a hospice nurse. He has previously sung in a boy band (BXess, later Manhattan). He has three sisters. He was slightly overweight when he was a kid.

=== Deutschland sucht den Superstar ===
Show (Original airdate)	Song (Artist)	Percentage of calls
Top 15 (19 February 2011)	Ich bau dir ein Schloss (Jürgen Drews)	
Top 10 (26 February 2011)	Wahnsinn (Wolfgang Petry)	
Top 9 (5 March 2011)	Ein Stern (...der deinen Namen trägt) (DJ Ötzi & Nik P.)	
Top 8 (12 March 2011)	Verlieben, verloren, vergessen, verzeihen (Wolfgang Petry)	
Top 7 (19 March 2011)	Hey! Baby (DJ Ötzi)	(7/7)

=== Post-DSDS ===
Langen is "in demand" and is a "solid player" in the music industry. Langen stated that "I'm still traveling a lot. The success of DSDS has never really flattened."

== Discography ==
=== Singles ===
Year	Title	Peak chart position		
Year	Title	GER	AUT	SWI
2011	"Pures Gold"	62		
2012	"Einer von Millionen"			
2014	"Ich wähl' deine Nummer"			
2015	"Wunderbar"			
2015	"Au Revoir, Cherie"			
2016	"Herz aus Glas"			
