= List of linguistic grammar schools =

This list includes linguistic grammar schools (grammar schools specialising in modern languages). Linguistic Grammar schools are defined as schools were pupils can study at least three foreign languages, including at least two modern languages, in junior secondary school.

== Argentina ==
- Colegio Nacional de Monserrat

== Austria ==
- Europagymnasium Klagenfurt am Wörthersee
- Bundesgymnasium und Bundesrealgymnasium Bad Ischl

== Democratic Republic of the Congo ==
- Lycée Français Blaise Pascal Lubumbashi

== Germany ==
=== Bavaria ===
- Kurt-Huber-Gymnasium (Gräfelfing)
- Elsa-Brändström-Gymnasium (Munich)
- Nymphenburger Gymnasium (Munich)
- Platen-Gymnasium Ansbach
- Gymnasium Weilheim
- Adolf-Weber-Gymnasium (Munich)
- Privates Lyzeum der Republik Griechenland in Nürnberg

=== Berlin ===
- Tagore-Gymnasium

=== Brandenburg ===
- Humboldtgymnasium Potsdam
- Gymnasium auf den Seelower Höhen (Seelow)

=== Hamburg ===
Lichtwark-Schule

=== Hesse ===
- Albert Schweitzer Schule Hofgeismar
- Albert-Einstein-Schule (Schwalbach)

=== Lower Saxony ===
- Athenaeum Stade
- Halepaghen-Schule Buxtehude
- Humboldtschule Hannover
- Gymnasium Ursulaschule
- Pädagogium Bad Sachsa

=== Mecklenburg-Western Pomerania ===
- Gymnasium am Sonnenberg Crivitz

=== North Rhine-Westphalia ===
- Gymnasium Heißen (Mülheim an der Ruhr)
- Kaiser-Karls-Gymnasium (Aachen)
- Gymnasium Petrinum Brilon
- Gymnasium Leopoldinum (Detmold)
- Steinbart-Gymnasium (Duisburg)
- Willibrordgymnasium (Emmerich)
- Burggymnasium Essen
- Evangelisch Stiftisches Gymnasium Gütersloh
- Lindengymnasium Gummersbach
- Albrecht-Dürer-Gymnasium Hagen
- Gymnasium Hammonense (Hamm)
- Freiherr-vom-Stein-Gymnasium (Kleve)
- Gymnasium Rodenkirchen (Cologne)
- Engelbert-Kaempfer-Gymnasium (Lemgo)
- Zeppelin-Gymnasium Lüdenscheid
- Mathematisch-Naturwissenschaftliches Gymnasium Mönchengladbach
- Stiftisches Humanistisches Gymnasium Mönchengladbach
- Gymnasium Paulinum (Münster)
- Pelizaeus-Gymnasium Paderborn
- Marie-Curie-Gymnasium Recklinghausen
- Gymnasium Laurentianum Warendorf
- Andreas-Vesalius-Gymnasium Wesel
- Städtisches Gymnasium Wermelskirchen
- Erzbischöfliches St.-Angela-Gymnasium (Wipperfürth)

=== Rhineland-Palatinate ===
- Max-Planck-Gymnasium Ludwigshafen
- Edith-Stein-Gymnasium Speyer

=== Saxony ===
- Leon-Foucault-Gymnasium Hoyerswerda
- Lessing-Gymnasium Hoyerswerda
- Gotthold-Ephraim-Lessing-Gymnasium Kamenz

=== Schleswig-Holstein ===
- Altes Gymnasium Flensburg
- Goethe-Schule Flensburg
- Auguste-Viktoria-Schule (Flensburg)
- Fördegymnasium (Flensburg)
- Heinrich-Heine-Schule Heikendorf
- Auguste-Viktoria-Schule Itzehoe
- Gymnasium Kaltenkirchen
- Burckhardtgymnasium Kiel

== France ==
- Lycée Diwan de Carhaix
- La Providence
- Lycée général et Technologique MICRO LYCEE
- Lycée général et Technologique Félix Proto

== Greece ==
- 4o Geniko Lykeio (Gel) Mytilinis
- Geniko Lykeio Ippeiou
- Esperino Lykeio Mytilinis
- Geniko Lykeio Mantamadou
- 2o Geniko Lykeio Mytilinis
- Geniko Lykeio Geras
- Geniko Lykeio Polichnitou Lesvou
- 3o Geniko Lykeio (Gel) Mytilinis
- Geniko Lykeio Plomariou
- Geniko Peiramatiko Lykeio Mytilinis
- Geniko Lykeio Pamfilon Lesvou
- Geniko Lykeio Antissas Lesvou
- Lykeio Agras
- Geniko Lykeio Petras
- 5o Geniko Lykeio Mytilinis

== Italy ==
Many places in Italy have a linguistic grammar school (Liceo linguistico), frequently with other kinds of grammar school.

- Liceo „Dante Alighieri“ (Brixen)
- Oberschulen Jakob Philipp Fallmerayer Brixen
- Istituto Marcelline Quadronno (Milan)
- Gymnasien Meran
- Oberschulzentrum Sterzing
- Nicolaus Cusanus Sprachen- und Realgymnasium

== Kazakhstan ==
- Deutsches Gymnasium Nur-Sultan – Schule Nr. 46 in Astana

== Poland ==
- Liceum Ogólnokształcące im. Jana Pawła II (Nadarzyn)
- Liceum Ogólnokształcące im. Stanisława Staszica (Pleszew)
- I Liceum Ogólnokształcące im.A.Mickiewicza (Olsztyn)

== Switzerland ==
- Freies Gymnasium Bern
- Kantonsschule St. Gallen
- Le Rosey

== United Kingdom ==
- Bloxham School
- Bury Grammar School
- Callywith College, Bodmin
- Colyton Grammar School
- Kesteven and Grantham Girls School
- King Edward VI Grammar School, Chelmsford
- King's School, Rochester
- Portsmouth Grammar School
- Queen Mary’s Grammar School (Walsall)
- Ripon Grammar School
- Southend High School for Girls
- St Benedict’s School, London
- United World College of the Atlantic, Vale of Glamorgan, Wales
- Wolverhampton Grammar School

== United States ==
=== California ===
- BASIS Independent Silicon Valley

=== New Jersey ===
- Haddonfield Memorial High School
