= Wipperfürth =

- Town
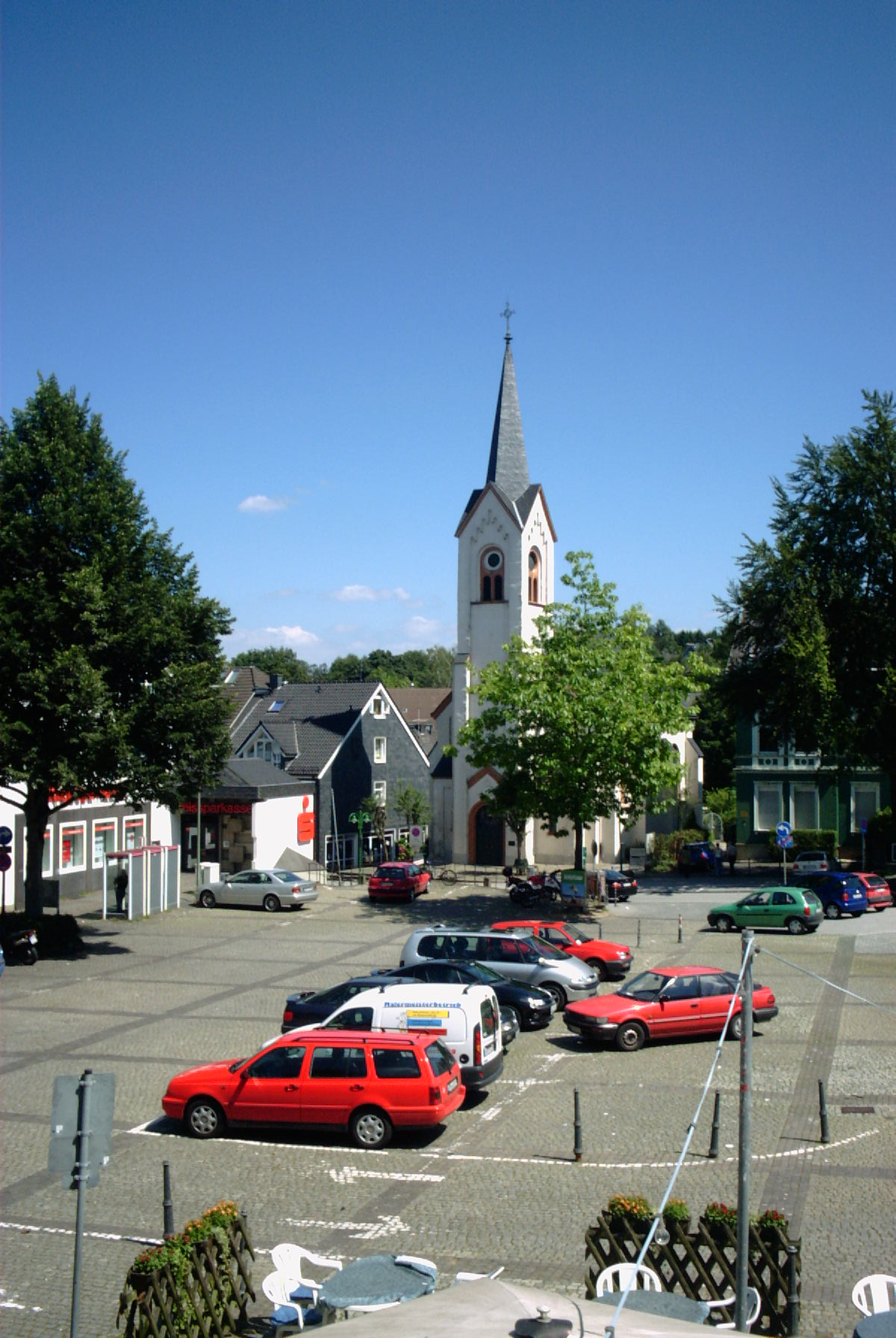
- Protestant church

- Flag Coat of arms

- Location of Wipperfürth within Oberbergischer Kreis district
- Interactive map of Wipperfürth
- Location within Germany Location within North Rhine-Westphalia
- Coordinates: 51°7′N 7°24′E
- Country: Germany
- State: North Rhine-Westphalia
- Admin. region: Köln
- District: Oberbergischer Kreis
- Subdivisions: 8

Government
  - Mayor (2020–25): Anne Michaela Loth

Area
  - Total: 118.3 km^{2} (45.7 sq mi)
- Elevation: 280 m (920 ft)

Population (2025-12-31)
  - Total: 21,480
  - Density: 181.6/km^{2} (470.3/sq mi)
- Time zone: UTC+01:00 (CET)
  - Summer (DST): UTC+02:00 (CEST)
- Postal codes: 51688
- Dialling codes: 02267
- Vehicle registration: GM
- Website: www.wipperfuerth.de

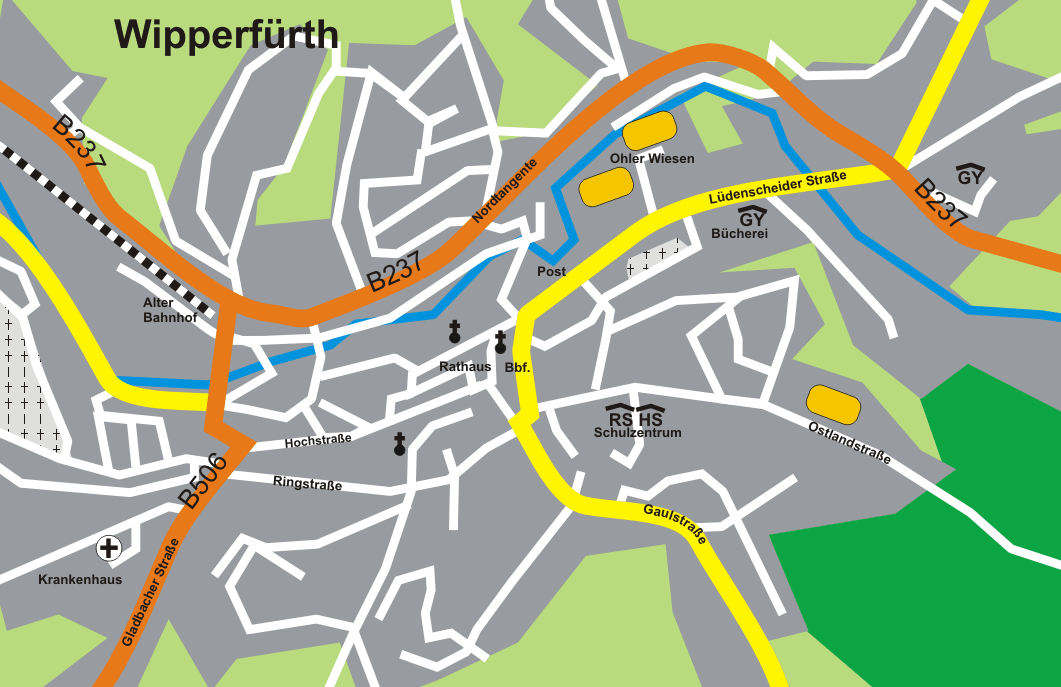
Map of the city

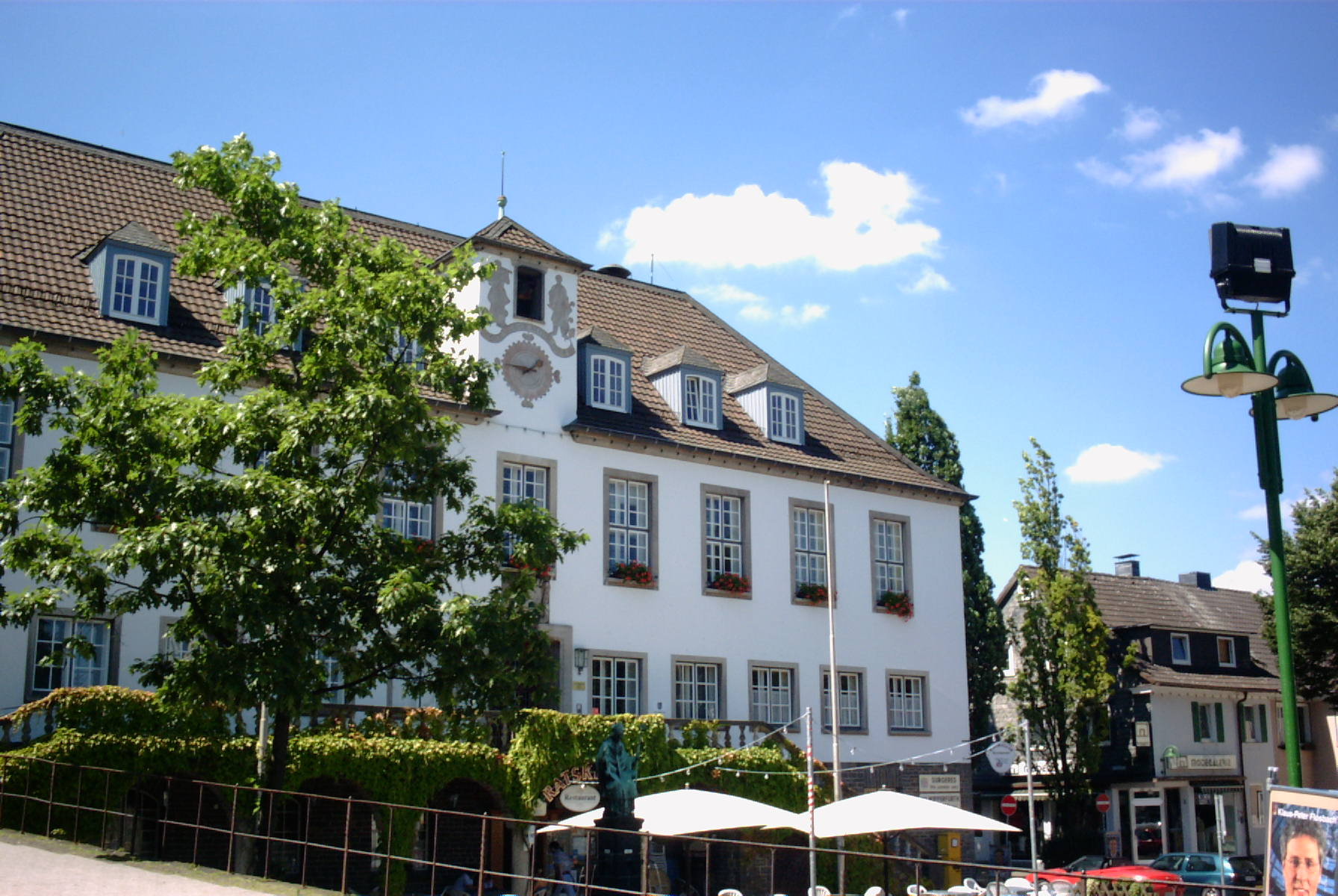
Town hall

Wipperfürth (German pronunciation: [ˈvɪpɐˌfʏʁt]) or the Hanseatic City of Wipperfürth is a municipality in the Oberbergischer Kreis of North Rhine-Westphalia, Germany, about 40 km north-east of Cologne, and the oldest town in the Bergischen Land. In the local dialect, a Bergish dialect of the Limburgish language the town is still being called Weperevorthe.

== History ==
The eldest documentary mention dates from 1131. In the Siegburger Mirakelbuch the place is already designated Oppidum(=town). Manner of writing of the first naming: "Weperevorthe". Wipperfürth received town rights between 1217 and 1222. Since 1283 the administration of the town was governed by count Adolf V. von Berg. Already in 1275 king Rudolf von Habsburg allowed the count to move his mint from Wildberg to Wipperfürth. Here, Pfennige were stamped according to Cologne model. In 1328, with the privilege of king Louis the Bavarian the first coinage of Groschen in Germany began in Wipperfürth. Since the 14th century the town was a member of the Hanse. Businesspeople of the town traveled to Stockholm, Dorpat, Malmö, Novgorod, Reval and Lübeck. The town coat of arms of 1267 shows a church in merlons-reinforced wall. Leftovers of this town wall can still be found on the Klosterberg. The oldest building are located at the market, together with the market well. The development of the town was hindered by numerous town fires: 1333, 1352, 1368, 1383, 1404, 1412 and 1465. From 1815–1932 Wipperfürth was capital town of the district with the same name.

== Geography ==
=== Geographical position ===
Wipperfürth lies on the flow Wupper which is designated in the upper reaches to the east of the town Wipper.

=== Neighbouring municipalities ===
The neighbouring municipalities and neighbouring towns are: Lindlar, Kürten, Wermelskirchen, Hückeswagen, Radevormwald, Halver, Kierspe and Marienheide.

=== Districts ===
The town Wipperfürth is made up of 8 districts:

- Wipperfürth
- Egen
- Kreuzberg (Wipperfürth)
- Ohl
- Agathaberg
- Thier
- Wipperfeld
- Hämmern

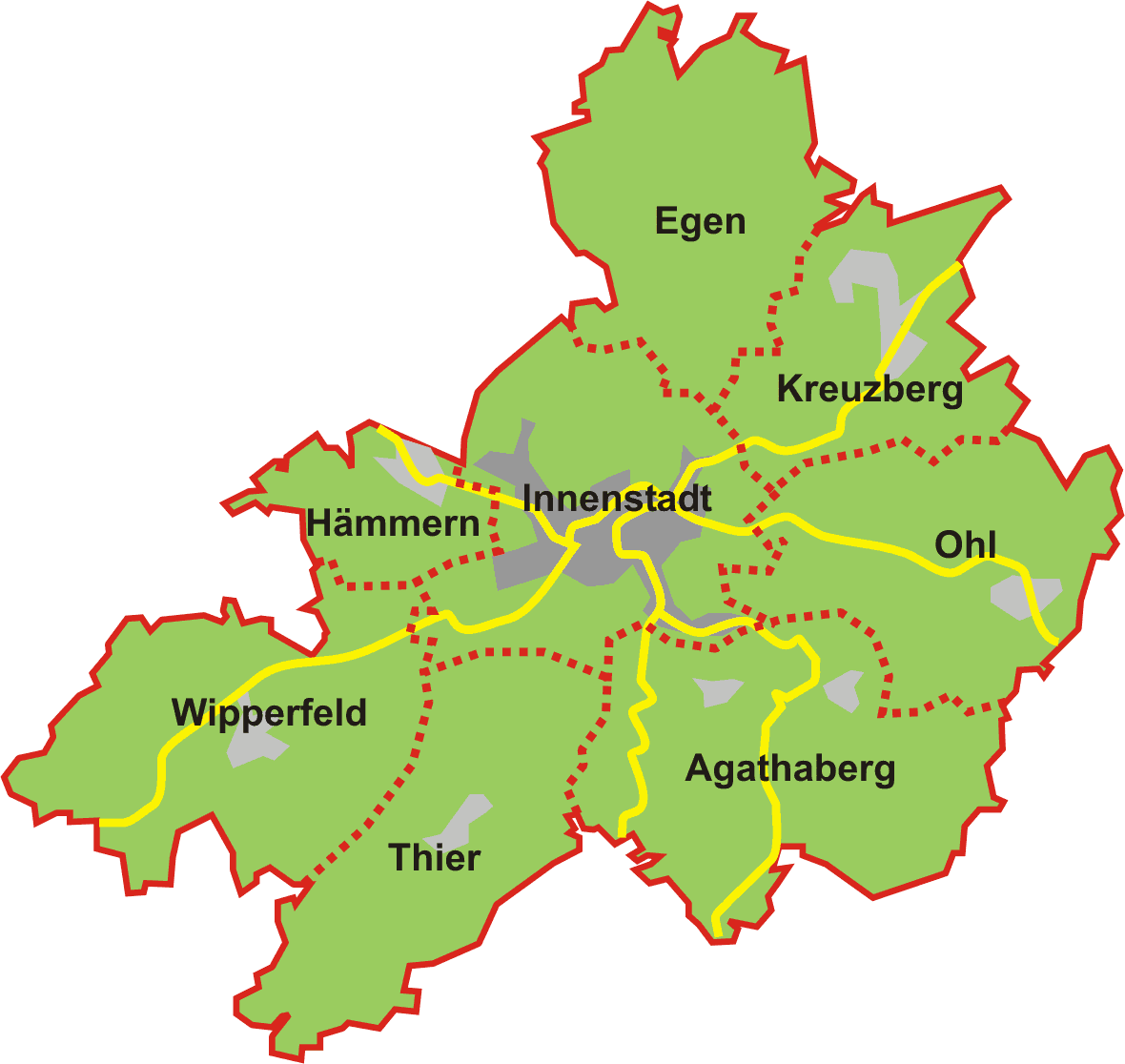
Districts of Wipperfürth

=== Localities ===
A	Abstoß – Abshof – Agathaberg – Ahe – Ahlhausen – Alfen – Altensturmberg – Arnsberg
B	Ballsiefen – Baumhof – Beinghausen – Bengelshagen – Benninghausen – Berge – Bergesbirken – Berghäuschen – Berghausen – Berghof – Berrenberg – Biesenbach – Birkenbaum – Birkerhof – Bochen – Böswipper – Boxberg – Boxbüchen – Bruch – Bühlstahl – Büschel
D	Dahl – Dellweg – Dhünn – Dievesherweg – Dörpinghausen – Dörrenbach – Dohrgaul – Drecke – Dreine
E	Egen – Egerpohl – Eichholz – Elbertzhägen – Engsfeld – Ente – Erlen
F	Fähnrichstütten – Fahlenbock – Finkelnburg – Fliegeneichen – Forste – Freihäuschen – Friedrichsthal – Frösseln – Fürden
G	Gardeweg – Gardeweger Mühle – Gerhardsfeld – Graben – Grennebach – Großblumberg – Großfastenrath – Großhöhfeld – Großscherkenbach – Grünenbaum – Grünenberg – Grüttenhausen – Grund – Grunewald – Grüterich
H	Hackenberg – Hämmern – Hammer – Hahnenberg – Hamböcken – Hambüchen – Halkenberg – Harhausen – Hardenbicke – Hasenburg – Hasselbick – Haufe – Heid – Heidtkotten – Hermesberg – Herweg – Herzhof – Hilgerbrücke – Hintermühle – Hinterschöneberg – Hinterwurth – Hönnige – Hof – Hohenbüchen – Hohl – Hollinden – Hollmünde – Hülsen – Hütten – Hungenberg
I	Ibach – Im Hagen – Isenburg
J	Jägerhof – Jörgensmühle – Jostberg – Julsiefen
K	Kahlenberg – Kahlscheuer – Kaplansherweg – Kerspe – Kirchenbüchel – Klaswipper – Kleineichhölzchen – Kleinfastenrath – Kleinscherkenrath – Klemenseichen – Kleppersfeld – Klespe – Klitzhaufe – Kluse – Kofeln – Kohlgrube – Kotten – Kremershof – Kreuzberg – Kupferberg – Küppersherweg
L	Lamsfuß – Langensiefen – Laudenberg – Leiersmühle – Lendringhausen – Lesenbüchen – Leuchtenbirken – Levenhausen – Lieth
M	Meddenbick – Mesewinkel – Mittelschneppen- Mittelschwarzen – Mosse – Müllensiepen
N	Nagelsbüchel – Nagelsgaul – Neeskotten – Neuenhaus – Neuensturmberg – Neumühle – Neye – Neye-Siedlung – Niederbenningrath – Niederdhünn – Niederengsfeld – Niederflossbach – Niedergaul – Niederholl – Niederkemmerich – Niederklüppelberg – Niederröttenscheid – Niederscheveling – Niederwipper
O	Oberbenningrath – Oberdierdorf – Oberflossbach – Obergaul – Oberholl – Oberholl – Oberkemmerich – Oberlüttgenau – Obermausbach – Obernien – Oberröttenscheid – Oberscheveling – Oberschneppen- Oberschwarzen – Ohl – Ommer – Ommerborn
P	Pannenhöh – Peffekoven – Peddenpohl – Peppinghausen – Platzweg – Poshof
R	Raffelsiefen – Ritterlöh – Ritzenhaufe – Roppersthal
S	Sanderhöhe – Sassenbach – Schäfershöh – Schleise – Schmalenfeld – Schneppen – Schniffelshöh – Schnipperingen – Schnipperinger Mühle – Schollenbach – Schwelmer Siepen – Schwickertzhausen – Sommerberg – Sonnenschein – Speckenbach – Stillinghausen – Stüttern
T	Their – Teufelswiese
U	Überberg – Unterdierdorn – Unterholl – Unterlüttgenau – Untermausbach – Unternien – Unterschneppen – Unterschwarzen – Unterstenhof – Unterthier
V	Vordermühle – Vorderschöneberg – Vorderwurth – Vossebrechen
W	Warth – Wasserfuhr – Wegerhof – Weier – Wiegen – Wingenbach – Wipperfeld – Wipperhof – Wüstemünte – Wüstenhof

== Population ==
Historical population

Year	Pop.	±% p.a.
1965	21,205	—
1970	22,214	+0.93%
1975	21,608	−0.55%
1980	20,782	−0.78%
1985	20,458	−0.31%
1990	21,487	+0.99%
1995	22,409	+0.84%

Year	Pop.	±% p.a.
2000	23,095	+0.60%
2005	23,669	+0.49%
2010	23,186	−0.41%
2015	21,481	−1.52%
2020	20,875	−0.57%
2025	21,480	+0.57%

Source: Landesdatabank Nordrhein-Westfalen

== The coat of arms of Wipperfürth ==
The arms were granted on 9 December 1975 but were in use a long time before. Wipperfürth received city rights between 1217 and 1222. The oldest seal dates from around 1250 and already shows a city wall, church and a small shield with the arms of the Counts of Berg, who ruled over the city. In the 14th century the small shield was removed. The present arms are based and nearly identical to the composition of the first seal. The city wall denotes the civic character of Wippenfürth, the church is the local St. Nicholas church.

== Politics ==
Party	Seats	Ref.
Christian Democratic Union	17	
Social Democratic Party	8	
UWG	4	
Green Party	7	
Free Democratic Party	2	

== Culture and places of interest ==
=== Dams ===
- Kierspe dam
- Neye dam
- Schevelinger dam
- Bever dam

=== Buildings ===
- Altes Seminar ("Old seminar") in the Lüdenscheider Straße.
- the former Franziskanerkloster (a cloister)

=== Churches ===
By far the oldest church in Wipperfürth is the Catholic parish church St.-Nikolaus placed in the downtown of Wipperfürth. Not far away, the Protestant church was built next to the marked-place in 1875. The so-called Antoniuskirche ("Antonius-church", a minister) was built on the Klosterberg ("cloister hill").

=== Spare time and sport ===
The town disposes of various sports field, stadium with field, indoor swimming pool with 25 meters of roads incl. sauna and sunbathing area, airfield, tennis courts, squash, riding spaces and play bowls.

==== Sport clubs ====
- Airfield – Wipperfürth-Neye EDKN
- DLRG Wipperfürth
- 1.Wipperfürther Rock´n Roll Club
- BKV Oberberg
- Boxing club Wipperfürth
- BSG Wipperfürth
- Canoe friends Wipperfürth e. V.
- Aerial sport association Wipperfürth
- Motor sport club Wipperfürth in AAA road service e. V.
- Cycling club Wipperfürth
- Riding association Wipperfürth
- Chess club Wipperfürth
- Sports fisherman association Wipperfürth
- Sports club Wipperfürth
- Stadtsportverband Wipperfürth
- Dance corps
- Dance school Böhlefeld
- Diving sport community Wipperfürth
- TC Silber-Blau Wipperfürth
- TV Wipperfürth
- VfR Wipperfürth
- VSG Wipperfürth e. V.
- WTC Wipperfürth

== Economy ==
During the Industrial Revolution several companies originated in the area of the textile industry. The most important industry company is the electric light bulb factory founded in 1904 Radium.

Radium also is even today together with the armature factory VOSS the biggest employer in Wipperfürth. Here particularly the electric-working industry, plastic-working industry, metal working industry and paper-working industry is resident.

== Transport ==
=== Federal highways ===
Wipperfürth lies in the intersection of the federal highways B 237 (Remscheid- Meinerzhagen) and B 506 (Cologne – Wipperfürth). The B 256 unidirectional Gummersbach in the place Ohl for the B 237.

=== Bus routes ===
(VRS: Verkehrsverbund Rhein-Sieg, VRL: Verkehrsgemeinschaft Ruhr-Lippe), OVAG: Oberbergische Verkehrsgesellschaft AG, MVG: Märkische Verkehrsgesellschaft GmbH, KWS: Kraftverkehr Wupper-Sieg AG)

- VRS (KWS) Linie 426 to Bergisch Gladbach (S) via Kürten
- VRS (KWS) Linie 427 to Bergisch Gladbach (S) via Kürten-Weiden
- VRS (KWS) Linie 429 to Bergisch Gladbach (S) via Kürten-Olpe
- VRS (OVAG) Linie 332 to Engelskirchen Bf. via Lindlar
- VRS (OVAG) Linie 333 to Engelskirchen Bf. via Lindlar-Frielingsdorf
- VRS (OVAG) Linie 336 to Marienheide via Gummersbach or ro Hückeswagen and Remscheid-Lennep
- VRS (OVAG) Linie 337 to Egen via Neye
- VRS (OVAG) Linie 338 to Kreuzberg
- VRL (MVG) Linie 55 to Lüdenscheid via Haken-Kreuzberg und Halver

== Public facilities ==
- Employment centre
- District court
- Tax office
- Youth welfare office
- forestry office
- Test place of the safety standards authority
- Branch of the circle health office

== Health ==
Hospitals: St. Josef hospital Wipperfürth (258 beds)

== Education ==
The municipality has two high schools, Engelbert von Berg – Gymnasium (high school), and Archbishop of St. Angela Gymnasium (high school), a secondary modern school, a Konrad Adenauer – secondary school, a work pedagogic school (occupational lecture), eight elementary schools and two special schools.

== Notable people ==
- Nicolas Abdat (* 1996), football player
- Johann Christian Josef Abs (1781–1823), teacher
- Johann Joseph Bauerband (1800–1878), lawyer, university professor, politician
- Franz Rudolf Bornewasser (1866–1951), bishop from Trier since 1922
- Franz Crass (1928–2012) Operatic bass singer
- Manuela Goller (born 1971), Football goalkeeper
- Thorsten Hens, professor, Department of Banking and Finance, University of Zurich
- Hans Leo Kausemann, former mayor and former District Administrator and honorary citizen
- Barbara Kisseler, civilized nation secretary in Berlin
- Mark Lamsfuß (* 1994), badminton player
- Udo Lattek (1935–2015), Retired football coach
- Stephan Ley (1867–1964), Beethoven scholar
- Ernst Lotz (1887–1948), the first minister of education and culture from Rhineland-Palatinate
- Konrad Martin (1812–1879), bishop of Paderborn
- Joseph Mausbach (1861–1931), Morality theologian, Sozialethiker, parliamentarian
- Frank Mock, Retired Football Coach
- Alois Pollender (1800–1879), discoverer anthrax bazillus (1855)
- Fritz Vollbach, composer and musician
- Hermann Voss, Former mayor and honorary citizen
- Sebastian Wurth (born 1994), Deutschland sucht den Superstar season 8 participant

== Twin town ==
- Surgères, Charente-Maritime in France

== Further sources of information ==
=== Literature (German) ===
- Joseph John, Geschichte der Stadt Wipperfürth, Gummersbach 1842;
- Conrad Schmitz, Geschichte der Stadt Wipperfürth, Wipperfürth 1910;
- Paul Engel, Wipperfürth im Wandel der Zeiten, Wipperfürth 1949;
- Peter Opladen, Das Dekanat Wipperfürth, Siegburg 1955;
- Anneliese Triller/Jörg Füchtner, Das Abschriftenbuch der Stadt Wipperfürth, Essen 1969;
- Frank Berger/Fred Antweiler, Wipperfürth gestern und heute, Remscheid 1984
- Fred Antweiler/Frank Berger, Wipperfürth und seine Kirchdörfer, Bergisch Gladbach 1986.
