= Wipperfeld =

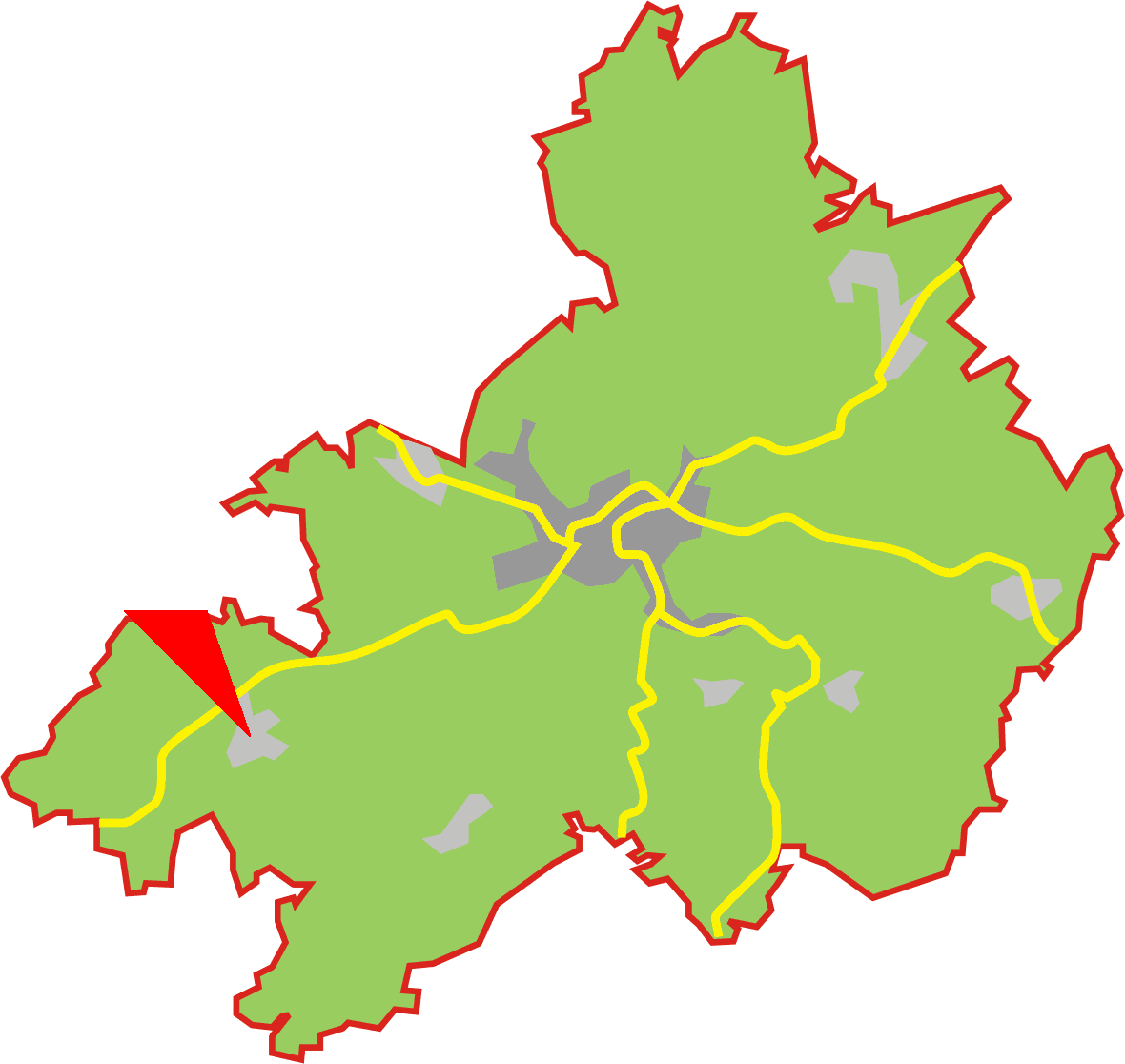
- Position of Wipperfeld in the town of Wipperfürth
- Coordinates: 51°05′20″N 7°19′28″E
- Country: Germany
- State: North Rhine-Westphalia
- Admin. region: Köln
- District: Oberbergischer Kreis
- Town: Wipperfürth
- Highest elevation: 280 m (920 ft)
- Lowest elevation: 250 m (820 ft)

Population (February 28, 2005)
  - Total: 1,876
  - District: 1,698 (12−31−2,002)
- Area code: 02268

Wipperfeld is a village and a district in the town of Wipperfürth which is a Northrhine-Westphalian municipality in the Oberbergischer Kreis, about 40 km north-east of Cologne.

== Geographical position ==
Wipperfeld is set in the west of Wipperfürth, next to the federal road B506 from Wipperfürth to Bergisch Gladbach.

Villages proximate to Wipperfeld are Lamsfuß, Erlen, Grüterich, Überberg and Oberholl.

The river "Wipperfelder Bach" runs through the village.

== The district Wipperfeld ==
The district Wipperfeld consists of the following villages:

- Arnsberg
- Birkerhof
- Boxberg
- Buchholz
- Ente
- Erlen
- Fahlenbock
- Frößeln
- Gerhardsfeld
- Grund
- Grunewald
- Hamböcken
- Heid
- Herweg
- Hüffen
- Julsiefen
- Kofeln
- Lamsfuß
- Lieth
- Mittelschneppen
- Mittelschwarzen
- Neumühle
- Niederdhünn
- Oberholl
- Obermausbach
- Oberschneppen
- Oberschwarzen
- Pannenhöh
- Sommerberg
- Überberg
- Unterholl
- Untermausbach
- Unterschneppen
- Unterschwarzen
- Wüstenhof

== History ==
=== Mediaeval Times ===
In mediaeval times the village formed a part of the department of Steinbach (Lindlar) and belonged to the district of the country court in Lindlar.

The parish church of Wipperfeld was built in the 12th century. The present-day church was built in 1892 and consecrated in 1894.

=== Modern times ===
Up unto the 19th century a flour mill was in operation. The mill is identified in the "Statistik des Bergischen Landes von 1797".

In 1890 Mr Mausbach from Wipperfeld was elected as the mayor of Lindlar.

Up to 1975 an independent municipality of Wipperfeld existed.

== Culture ==
=== Parish Churches ===
- Catholic church of St. Klemens. Wipperfeld

== Schools ==
- Catholic elementary school Wipperfeld

== Traffic ==
=== Federal roads ===
The federal road B506 from Wipperfürth to Bergisch Gladbach runs next to Wipperfeld.

=== Bus routes ===
Bus stops Wipperfeld, Wipperfeld, Wende, Wipperfeld, Kirche:

- VRS (KWS) 427 to Bergisch Gladbach (S) via Kürten-Weiden
- VRS (KWS) 426 to Bergisch Gladbach (S) via Kürten

== Literature ==
=== German ===
- Führer, Gerhard: Alarm durch Läuten, Blasen und Trommelschlagen : die Feuerwehren von Olpe und Wipperfeld in früherer Zeit. In: Rhein.-Berg. Kalender 66. 1996 (1995) S. 183-187
- 75 Jahre St.-Seb.-Schützenbruderschaft Wipperfeld 1921 e. V. Wipperfeld 1996
