= Achim Petry =

German singer and musician (born 1974)

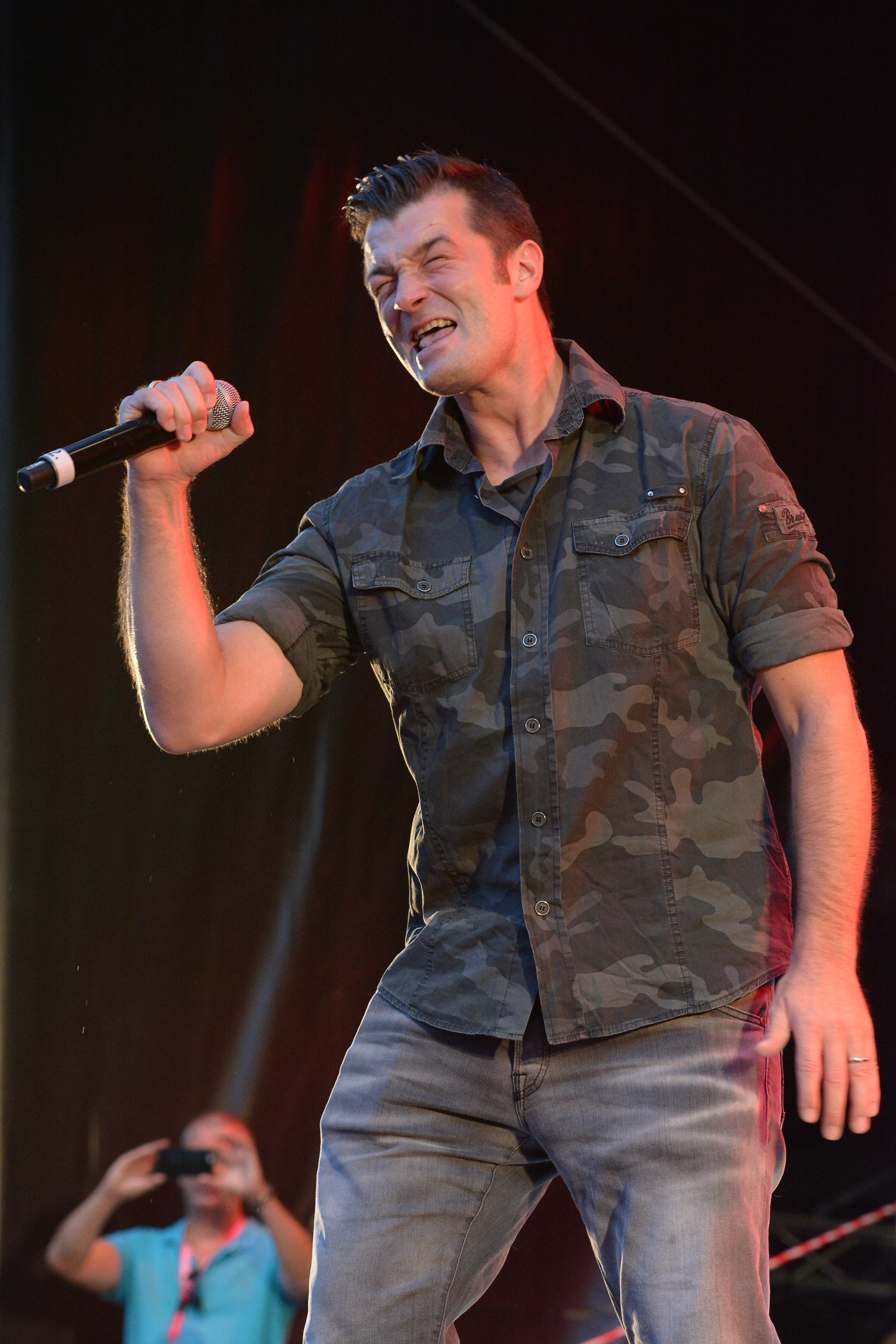
- Petry at Essen.Original. in 2015
- Born: 24 August 1974 (age 51); Bonn, North Rhine-Westphalia, Germany
- Father: Wolfgang Petry
- Musical career
- Genres: Pop, teen pop, adult contemporary, soft rock, pop rock, alternative rock, dance
- Occupations: Singer, musician
- Formerly of: Trademark
- Website: www.achimpetry.de

Achim Petry (born 24 August 1974) is a German singer and musician, best known for singing in the German pop trio Trademark.

== Biography ==
Achim Petry is the son of the Schlager-singer Wolfgang Petry. Back to mid-1990s, Petry was a member of a German musical group Trademark, working under the name of Achim Remling, together with two other members Mirko Bäumer and Sascha Sadeghian. The group Trademark later dissolved in early 2000s. Starting in 2007, Achim Petry began his solo career, with new editions of his father's old hits.

== Discography ==
=== Albums ===
- 2007: So wie ich!
- 2008: So wie ich! (Special Edition)
- 2013: Mein Weg
- 2014: Mittendrin

=== Singles ===
- 2007: Keiner liebt dich …
- 2008: Dschungel Wahnsinn (feat. Dschungel Allstars)
- 2008: Das wird 'ne lange Nacht
- 2008: Wie ein Komet (Promo)
- 2009: Maria Maria
- 2013: Deine Liebe ist der Wahnsinn
- 2013: Rosalie
- 2014: Rettungsboot (feat. Wolfgang Petry)

== Tour ==
- 2008: Der Wahnsinn geht weiter
