= Engelbert-von-Berg-Gymnasium Wipperfürth =

Gymnasium (secondary school) in Wipperfürth, Germany

Coordinates: 51.1204°N 7.4069°E

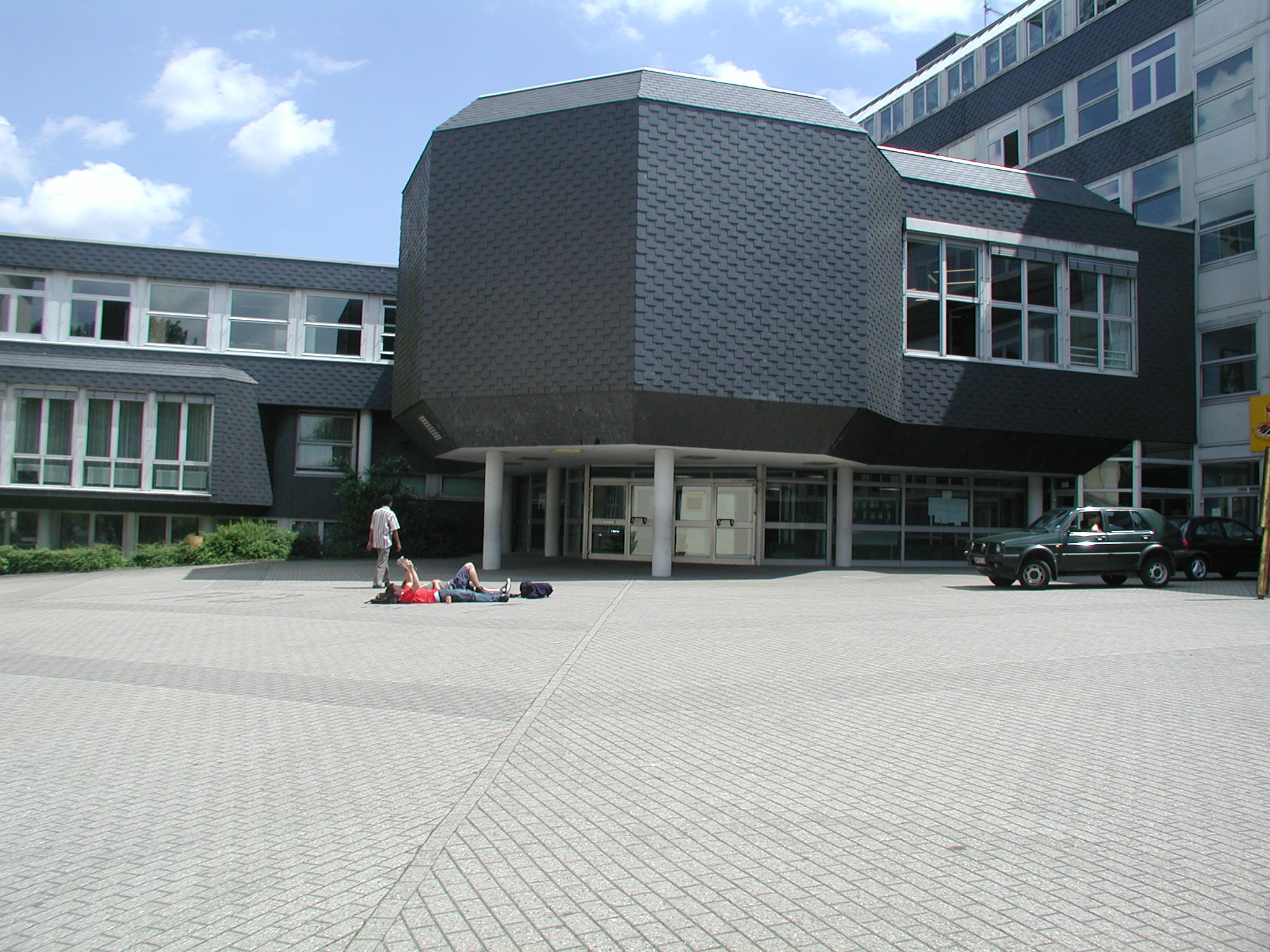
School

Engelbert-von-Berg-Gymnasium Wipperfürth (EvB) is a gymnasium (secondary school) in Wipperfürth, Germany.

The school in its modern form began in 1830.

== Notable alumni ==
- Afu Thomas - Social media figure in China
