= Hönnige =

Locality in North Rhine-Westphalia, Germany

Coordinates: 51.1325°N 7.4275°E

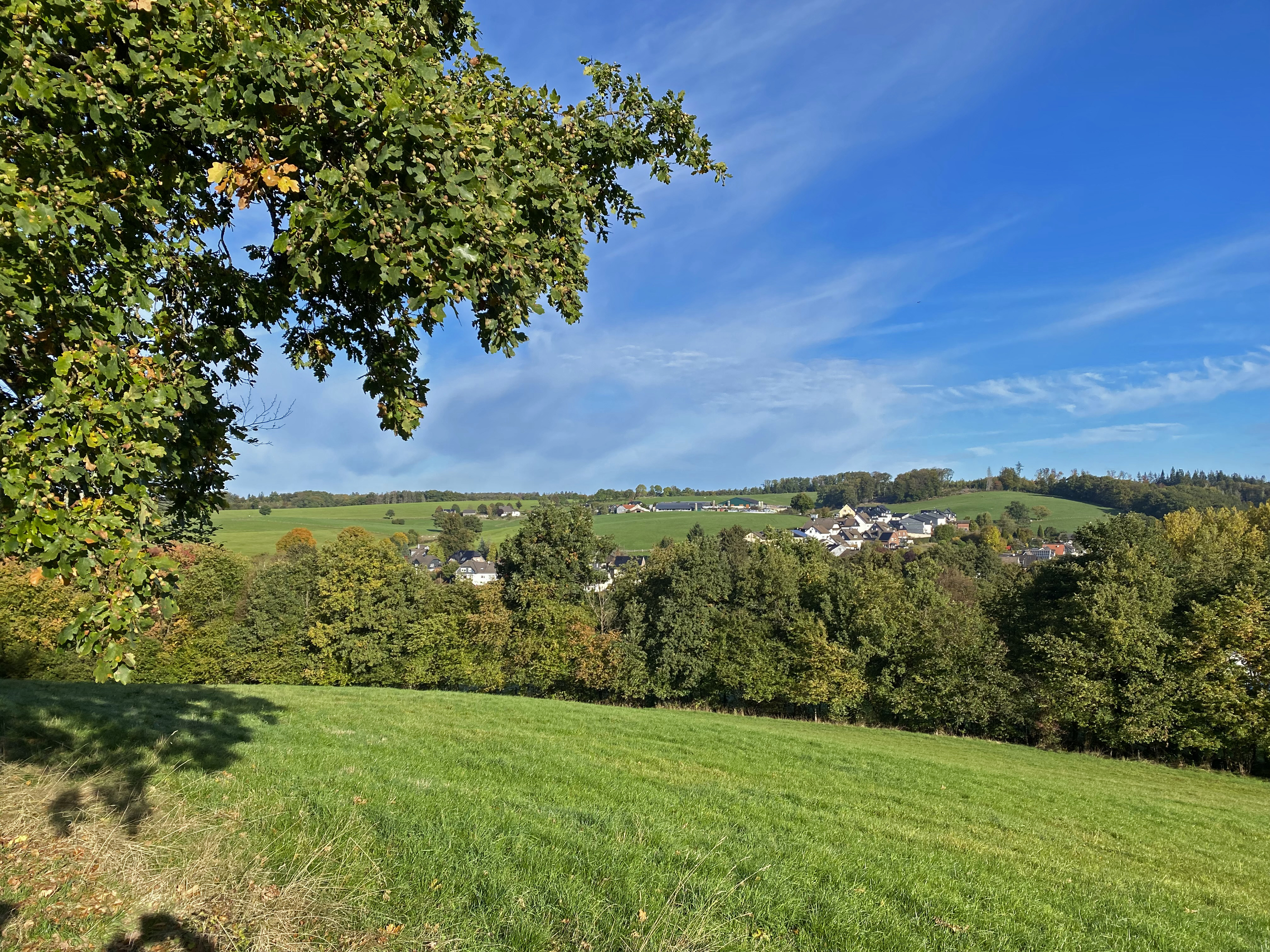

Hönnige is a locality of the municipality Wipperfürth in the Oberbergischer Kreis of North Rhine-Westphalia, Germany.
