= Johann Christian Josef Abs =

German teacher

Johann Christian Josef Abs (26 August 1781 in Wipperfürth – 15 April 1823 in Königsberg) was a German teacher.

In the year 1799 Abs gave his vow in the Franciscan monastery of Hamm and adopted the name of Theodosius. In 1806 he became head of the claustral school of Halberstadt. In this school, he accepted children without considering their ages, confessions, classes and sex. He often recruited his assistants among his pupils. His teachings included Bible studies, health and a tutorial in measurement. With the time, his method of teaching approached more and more that of Johann Heinrich Pestalozzi.

In 1810 Abs left the claustral school and announced the creation of a "boarding school for boys and girls". One year later, he published a tract on his adaptation of the teaching methods of Pestalozzi. In the feeling that a woman's care is beneficial for his pupils, he quit the priesthood in 1813, adopted the Evangelic confession and married a former assistant of his.

According to the eighth annual report of his institution, the school consisted of a care station for orphaned children, a preparation school for children who are not yet ready for their first lessons, an education school for children whose parents were unable to care for them themselves and finally a public school open for everyone who wishes to use his common sense.

In 1815 Abs became head of the regional orphanage and combined it with his elementary school and a teacher seminary. Foreign governments sent young men to him to learn his methods of teaching. In 1818 he followed a call to Königsberg where he became director of the royal orphanage. He successfully held this position until his death in 1823.

== Sources ==
- Allgemeine Deutsche Biographie - online version
