= Vordermühle =

Village in North Rhine-Westphalia, Germany

Coordinates: 51°04′57″N 7°26′02″E

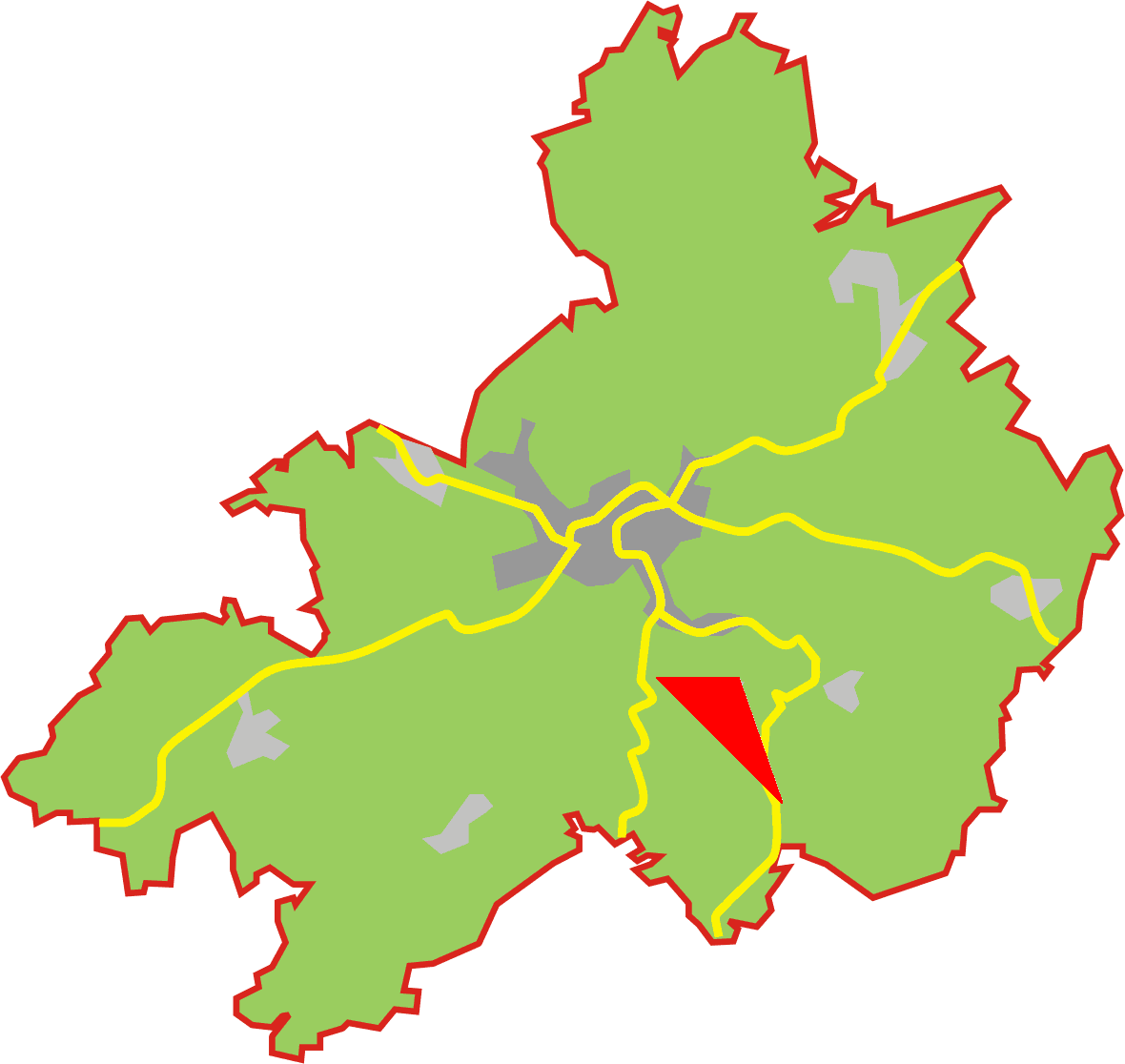
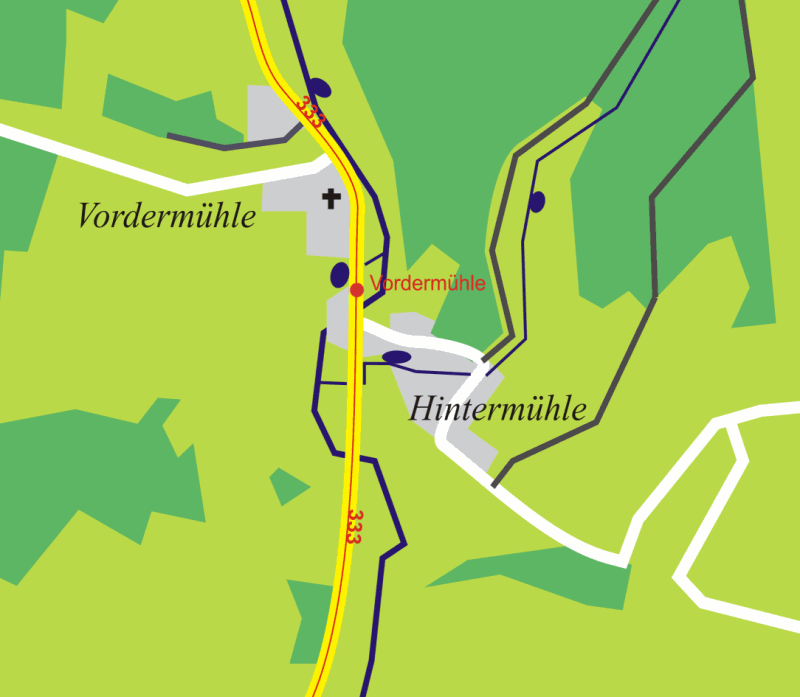
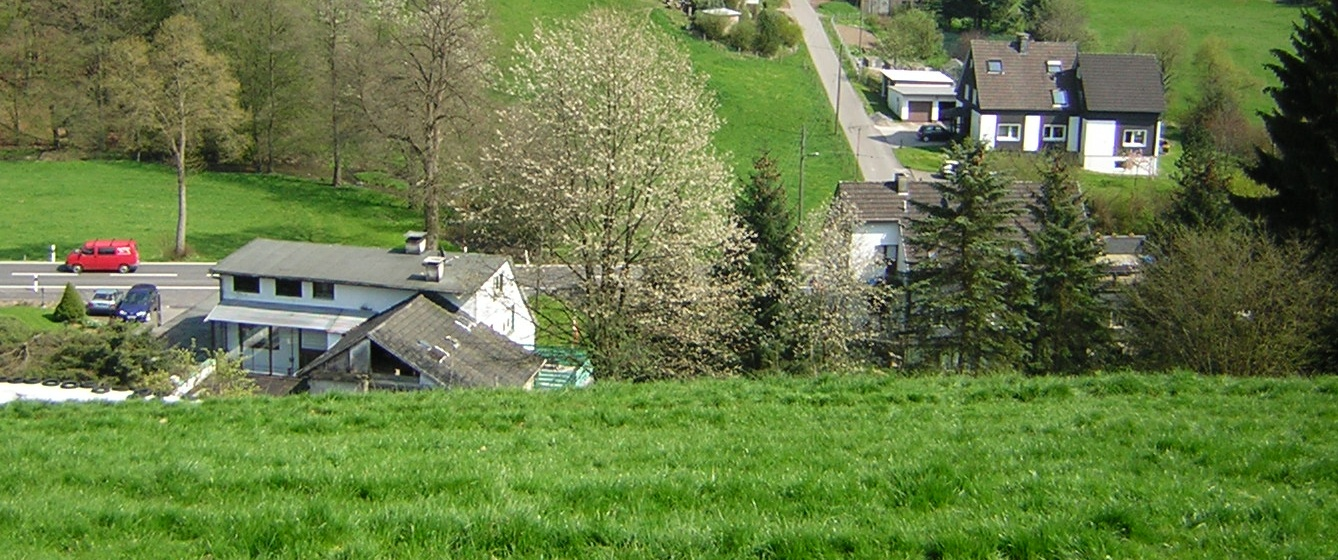
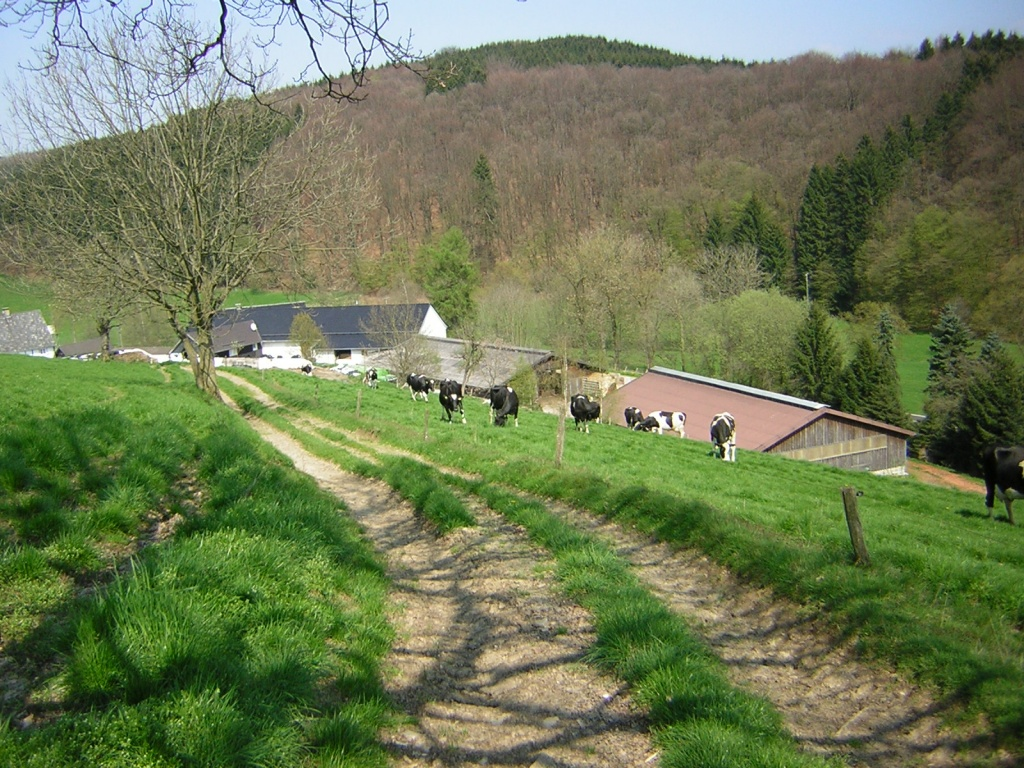
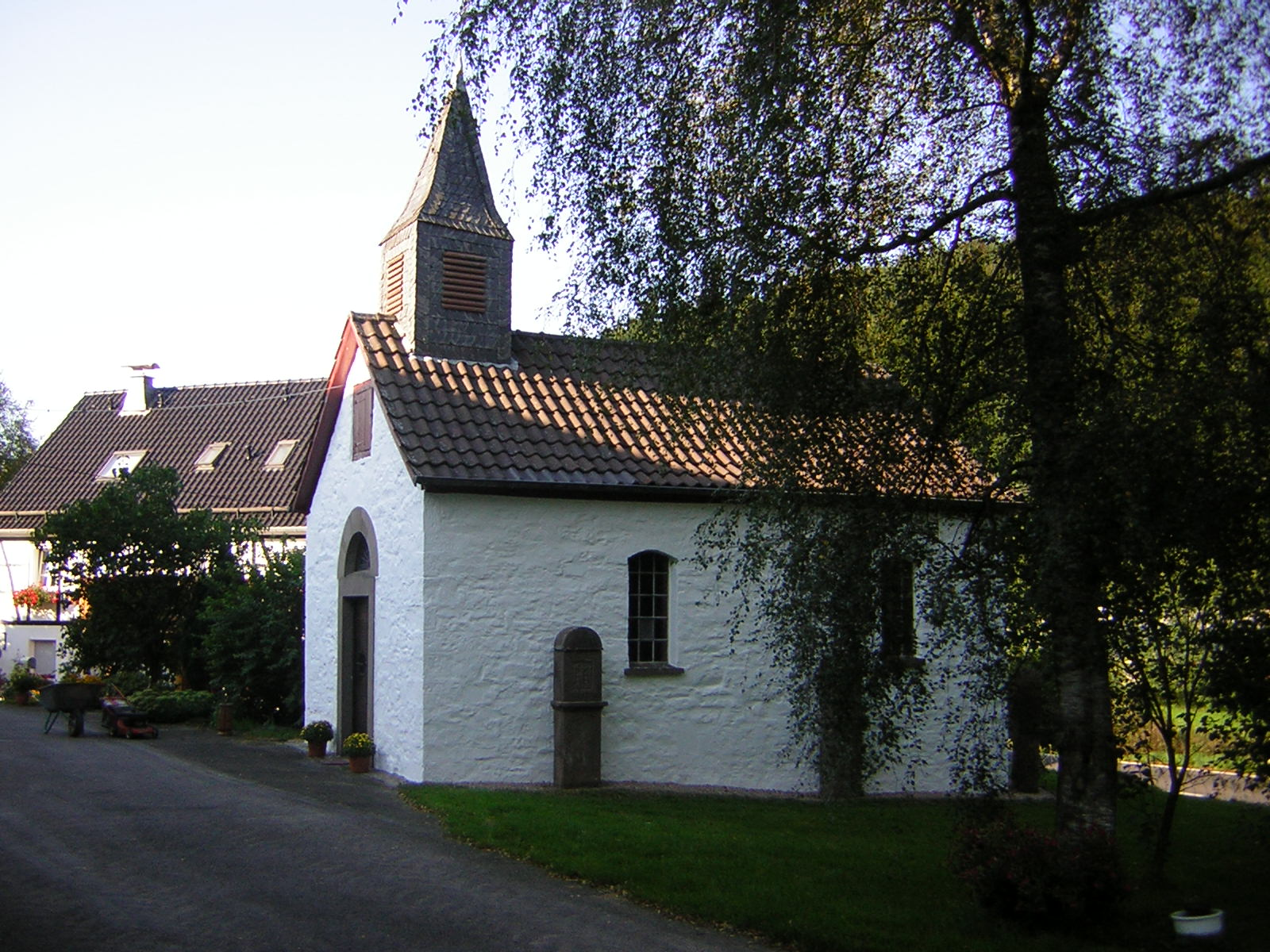
Position
Information
Population: (in 2005)	30
Geographical position:	7° 26' 02" Ost; 51° 04' 57" Nord
Height above sealevel:	250 m
Postal code :	51688
Prefix:	02267
pictures
Vordermühle street numbers 7-9
Vordermühle street numbers 5
The chapel of Vordermühle

Vordermühle is a village in North Rhine-Westphalia, Germany. It is in the municipality of Wipperfürth in the Oberbergischer Kreis, about 40 km north-east of Cologne.

== Geographical position ==
Like the close village of Hintermühle, Vordermühle has its own water supply. Villages near Vordermühle are Neeskotten, Klemenseichen, Wingenbach and Berrenberg.

Three rivers run through this village: the "Wingenbacher Siefen", the "Stüttemer Siefen" and the "Dierdorfer Siefen". All of them finally flow into the "Lindlarer Sülz".

The country lane L302 from Wipperfürth to the town of Frielingsdorf (Lindlar) passes through the village.

== History ==
The village was first mentioned in the year of 1548 as tho der Mollen. A simple translation of the village's name is "In front of the mill", which refers to the existence of a mill in this village.

=== The chapel ===
The chapel of Vordermühle was built in 1683. The population of the surrounding villages gather there in May to pray.

In the year of 1843 the small chapel was destroyed; its owner, Peter Wilhelm Stege, r rebuilt the chapel. The new chapel was bigger, 22 feet long and 15 feet wide and had a small tower with a bell. The population of Vordermühle longed for the chapel's lustration in order to celebrate Mass in the chapel. It failed because the question of who paid the charges was unanswered.

In 1845 Peter Wilhelm Steger and his family donated the chapel to the catholic parish in Wipperfürth and announced together with Johann Peter Schnippering to care for the chapel.

On May 17, 1845, priest Dünner lustrated the chapel to the Virgin Mother.

In 1857 a fire destroyed four houses and the chapel in Vordermühle. Again, Petr Wilhelm Steger rebuild the chapel with help of Johann Christian Börsch. Two years later priest Dünner lustrated two small bells.

The chapel was renovated in 1930. The expenses were paid by a collection in the school district of Vordermühle. Till 2004 the mass was celebrated every month in the chapel. A lack of priests in Wipperfürth makes this no longer possible today.

=== The Mill ===
Today the former mill is a bakery with a water wheel.

=== The old school ===
The building of the former school is renovated and used as a tenement. Pupils from Vordermühle go to Agathaberg in order to attend a primary school.

== Bus routes ==
Bus stop in Vordermühle:

- 332 Wipperfürth - Dohrgaul - Frielingsdorf - Lindlar - Engelskirchen Bf. (OVAG, Saturday and Sunday)
- 333 Wipperfürth - Dohrgaul - Frielingsdorf - Engelskirchen Bf. (OVAG, Monday till Sunday)
