= Trademark (group) =

Former German band

- Origin: Germany
- Genres: Pop, teen pop, Pop rock
- Years active: 1995–2002
- Labels: Na Klar! BMG International; Musicrama/Koch
- Past members: Achim Remling; Mirko Bäumer; Sascha Sadeghian

Trademark was a German vocal group consisting of three members, Achim Remling, Mirko Bäumer and Sascha Sadeghian. The group followed the Michael Learns to Rock sound, but with more ballad tempo. Their songs and singles included "I'll Be the One", "Only Love" and "Amazed".

"Only Love", "I'll Be the One" and "I'm Not Supposed to Love You Anymore" were hits in Asia.

After some years, the three members decided to break up and each of them started their own solo careers (according to the assistant of Achim Remling).

Their song "Only Love" was also covered by Cantopop artist Jacky Cheung under the title "愛下去" ("May Love Continue"). "Miss You Finally" was covered by Cantopop artist Eason Chan under the title "終於一百日" ("A Hundred Days Finally").

== Discography ==
=== Studio albums ===
- 1997: Another Time Another Place - GER #26
- 2000: Only Love
- 2002: Miss You Finally... The Very Best of Trademark

=== Singles and EPs ===
- 1997: "I'll Be the One" - GER #95
- 1997: "I'm Not Supposed..."
- 2000: "Amazed"
- 2000: "Only Love"
