= Klaus Lage =

German musician

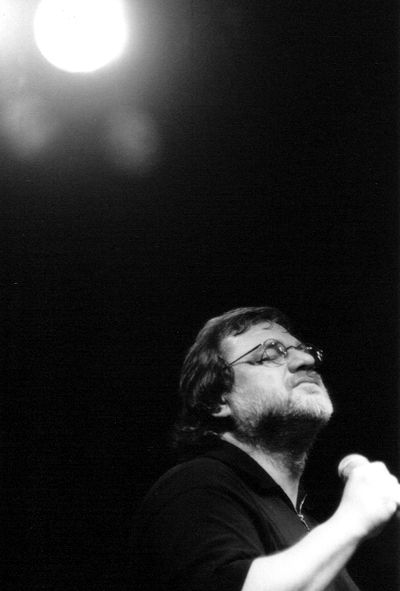
Klaus Lage

Klaus Lage (born 16 June 1950) is a German musician from Soltau, Lower Saxony. He is known for his 1984 single "1000 und 1 Nacht (Zoom!)".

== Life ==
Klaus Lage spent his childhood in Soltau before the family moved to Düsseldorf. Whilst living in Düsseldorf, he attended the Schloß-Gymnasium Benrath. He then later moved back to Soltau, whilst living in Soltau he undertook an apprentice to become a Wholesale Merchant. He did not complete it.

Lage, in 1970 moved to West Berlin, where he worked as an educator and social worker in a children's home.

== Career ==
Whilst living in West Berlin, Klaus made a name for himself with the Berlin Rock Ensemble. The quintet consisted of: Klaus Lage (vocals, guitar), Gregor Schaetz (guitar, vocals), Ralph Billmann (keyboard), Axel Crémer (bass) and Martin Crémer (drums).

== Discography ==
- Klaus Lage (1980)
- Positiv (1982)
- Stadtstreicher (1983)
- Schweißperlen (1984)
- Heiße Spuren (1985)
- Mit meinen Augen - Live (1986)
- Amtlich (1987)
- Rauhe Bilder (1989)
- Single Hit Collection 1982 - 1990 (1990)
- Lieben & Lügen (1991)
- Ein Lachen in Reserve (1992)
- Katz & Maus (1994)
- Live zu zweit (1999)
- Mensch bleiben (2000)
- Die Welt ist schön (2003)
- Zug um Zug (2007)

Klaus Lage has a long history of singing bluesy German hits.
