= Sebastian Wurth =

German singer

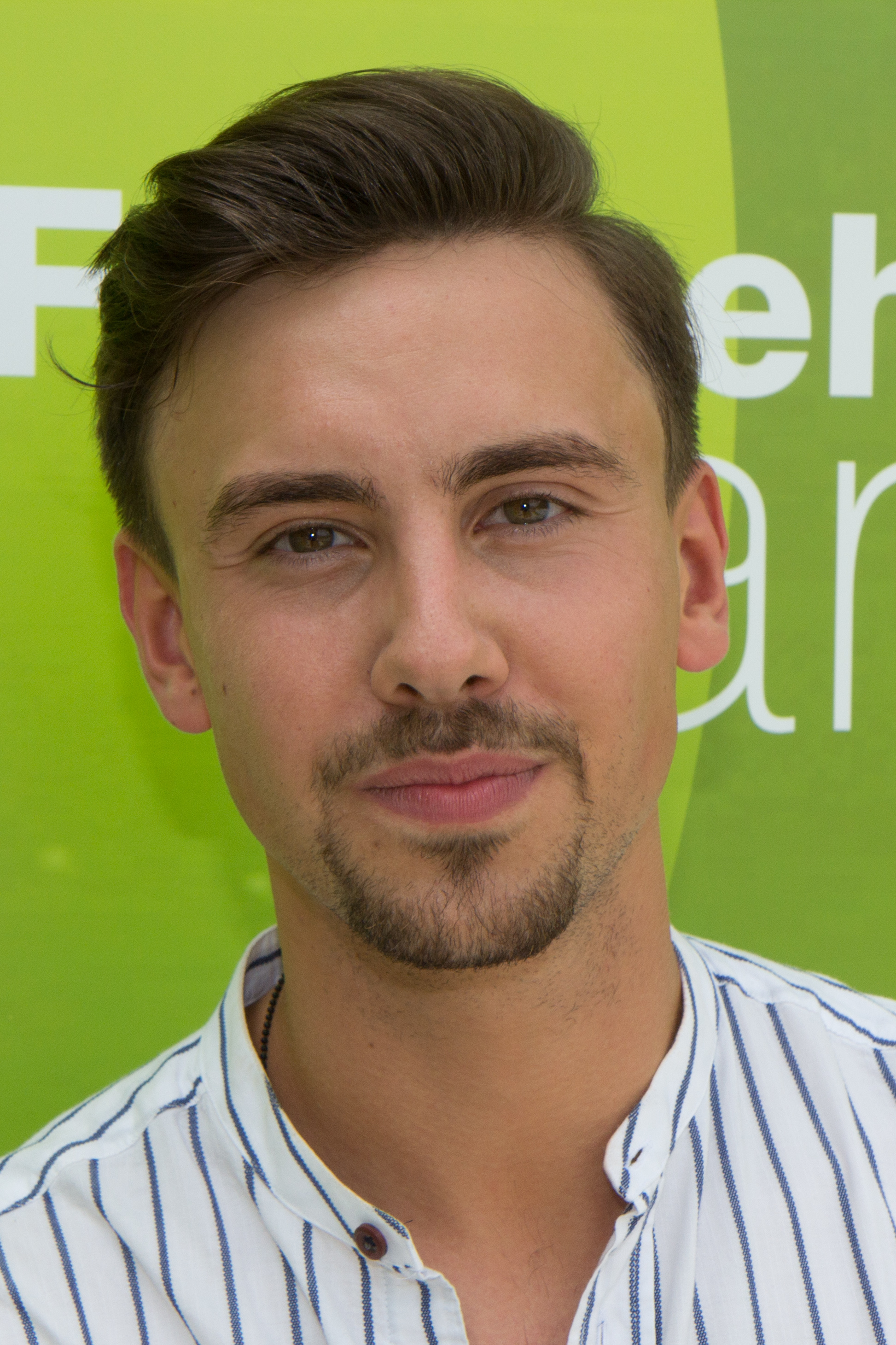
- Wurth in 2018.

Background information
- Born: Sebastian Wurth; 21 July 1994 (age 32); Wipperfürth, Germany
- Occupation: Singer
- Instruments: Vocals, guitar
- Years active: 2011–present

Sebastian Wurth (born 21 July 1994 in Wipperfürth, North Rhine-Westphalia) is a German singer and was a participant in season 8 of Deutschland sucht den Superstar, making it to the Top 5. He released his debut single, Hard to Love You, in 2011. One year later, he released his debut album, Strong, which reached number 34 on the German albums chart.

== Biography ==
=== Early life ===
Sebastian was born in Wipperfürth, North Rhine-Westphalia on 21 July 1994. He is a fan of Bayern Munich. He has already tried to be a songwriter. In his free time, he plays soccer, goes bowling, and likes to go to the cinema. He has a scooter. If his music career does not work out, he would like to study medicine or acting.

=== Deutschland sucht den Superstar ===
He was the youngest participant in season 8. Dieter Bohlen sees great potential in him. He is often compared with Justin Bieber because of their similar hair styles. RTL received a statement from the Office of Public Safety stating that Sebastian Wurth was not allowed to participate after 10 PM. RTL also received a 15,000 Euro fine for allowing him to participate after 10 PM.

==== Performances ====
Show (Original airdate)	Song (Artist)	Percentage of calls
Audition	I'm Yours (Jason Mraz)	
Recall		
Recall	Home (Michael Bublé)	
Top 15 (February 19, 2011)	Home (Michael Bublé)	
Top 10 (February 26, 2011)	You Raise Me Up (Westlife)	
Top 9 (March 5, 2011)	Ich war noch niemals in New York (Udo Jürgens / Sportfreunde Stiller)	
Top 8 (March 12, 2011)	You Don't Know (Milow)	
Top 7 (March 26, 2011)	Monsta (Culcha Candela)	
Top 6 (first show) (April 2, 2011)	Du trägst keine Liebe in Dir (Echt)	—
Top 6 (first show) (April 2, 2011)	Wonderful Life (Hurts)	—
Top 6 (second show) (April 9, 2011)	You and Me (In My Pocket) (Milow)	
Top 6 (second show) (April 9, 2011)	Hallelujah (Leonard Cohen / Rufus Wainwright)	
Top 5 (April 16, 2011)	Ayo Technology (Milow)	(5/5)
Top 5 (April 16, 2011)	I Promised Myself (Nick Kamen)	(5/5)
Top 5 (April 16, 2011)	Mandy (Barry Manilow)	(5/5)

=== Post-DSDS ===
Sebastian Wurth released his first single called "Hard to Love You". Sebastian is working with Tom Hugo and Erik Nyholm. Wurth has started a joint project with fellow DSDS alumni Dominik Büchele. Wurth stated that he miss the hype from DSDS. He does occasional appearances.

== Discography ==
=== Albums ===
Year	Title	Peak chart position		
Year	Title	GER	AUT	SWI
2012	Strong	34	50	81

=== Singles ===
Year	Title	Peak chart position		
Year	Title	GER	AUT	SWI
2011	"Hard to Love You"	18	59	—
2012	"You Let the Sun Go Down"	63	—	—
2012	"The Time Is Right"	—	—	—
