= Wolfgang Petry =

German schlager musician and songwriter

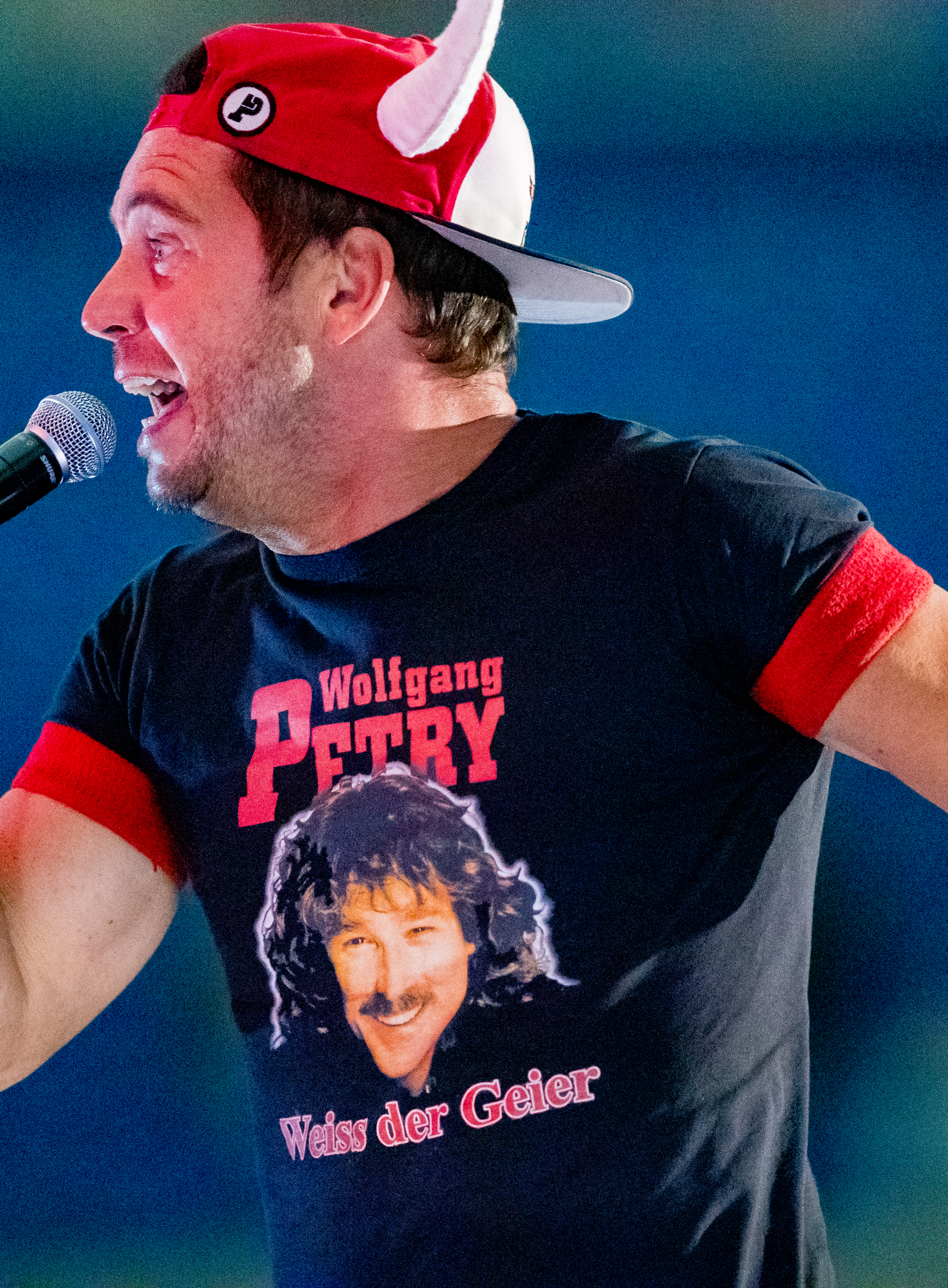
- Lorenz Büffel wearing a Wolfgang Petry shirt
- Born: Franz Hubert Wolfgang Remling; 22 September 1951 (age 75); Cologne, North Rhine-Westphalia, Germany
- Occupations: Singer; Songwriter
- Spouse: Rosemarie Remling (m. 1972)
- Children: Achim Petry
- Website: www.wolfgangpetry.de

Signature
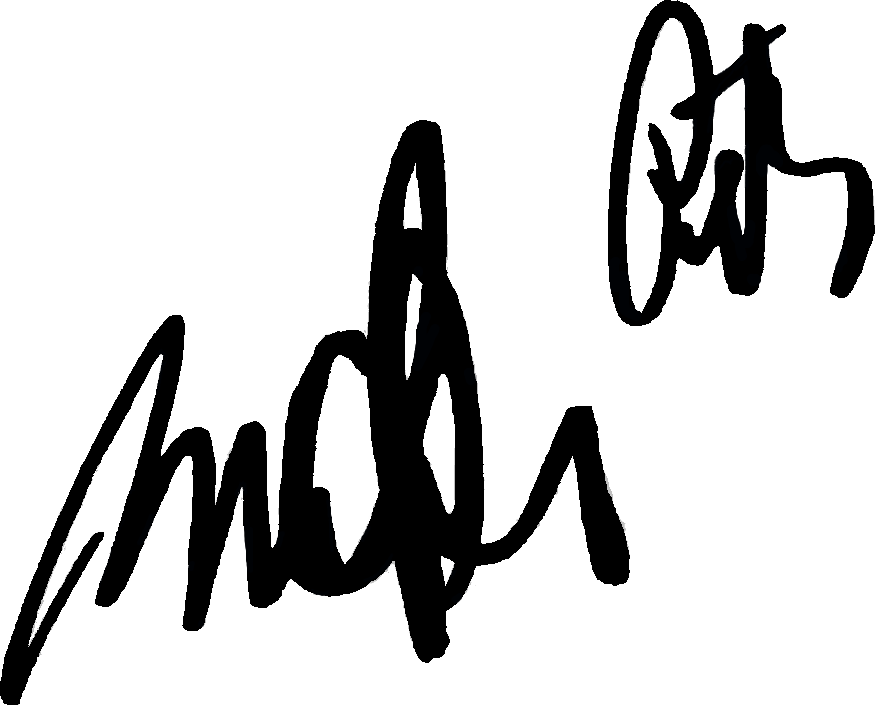

Wolfgang "Wolle" Petry (born Franz Hubert Wolfgang Remling, 22 September 1951) is a German schlager musician and songwriter from Cologne, Germany. In 1997, he was named the leading German language musician in terms of chart figures for the year, with his most successful album Alles.

He won the award for "Best Folk/Pop Artist" National/International" during the Echo awards in 1997, 1998, 1999, 2000 and 2001. He also won the Goldene Stimmgabel award in 1996, 1997, 1999, 2000, 2001, 2002, 2003 and 2005 for Most successful German solo pop act. In 1998 and 2006 he also won the "Platinum Life Award" during the same Goldene Stimmgabel awards.

In his side-project, the Pete Wolf Band he sings in English to more country-oriented music. The project started in 2017 and released albums in 2017 and 2019 as well as an EP in 2022.

== Personal life ==
Petry was born in the neighborhood of Raderthal in Cologne, Germany and grew up there. After his father's death at age 16, he assumed responsibility for his 11-year-old brother. He obtained a vocational degree in precision mechanics while touring with his band in Cologne and surroundings. He married Rosemarie in 1972 and had a son, Achim Petry, two years later. Achim has re-recorded or made new editions of some of his father's songs.

== Discography ==
=== Albums ===
Year	Name	English translation
1976	Ein Freund – Ein Mann	A Friend, a Man
1979	Zweisaitig	Two-sided/Two-stringed
1980	Ganz oder gar nicht	All or Nothing
1981	Einfach leben	Easy Living
1982	Der Himmel brennt	The Sky Is Burning
1983	Wahnsinn	Madness
1984	Rauhe Wege	Rough Paths
1987	Mit offenen Armen	With Open Arms
1988	Manche mögen's heiß	Some Like it Hot
1991	Wo ist das Problem?	Where's the Problem?
1992	Verlieben, verloren, vergessen, verzeih’n	Falling in Love, Lost, Forgot, Forgive
1992	Meine größten Erfolge	My Greatest Hits
1993	Sehnsucht nach dir	Longing for You
1994	Frei für dich	Free for You
1995	Egal	Whatever
1996	Alles	Everything
1996	Die längste Single der Welt – Teil 1	The Longest Single on Earth – Part 1
1996	Gnadenlos	Merciless
1997	Du bist ein Wunder	You're a Miracle
1997	Nie genug	Never Enough
1998	Freude!	Joy!
1998	Einfach geil!	Simply Cool!
1999	Die längste Single der Welt – Teil 2	The Longest Single on Earth – Part 2
1999	Alles – Live	Everything – Live
1999	Komplett	Completely
2000	Konkret	Concretely
2000	Freude 2	Joy 2
2001	Achterbahn	Rollercoaster
2001	Die längste Single der Welt – Teil 3	The Longest Single on Earth – Part 3
2002	Alles 2	Everything 2
2003	Kein Grund zur Panik	No Reason for Panic
2003	Freudige Weihnachten	Jolly Christmas
2004	Typisch	Typical
2004	Nur für dich	Just for You
2005	... Doppelt stark!!! (Doppel CD)	...Double Strong!!! (Double CD)
2005	Die längste Single der Welt – Das Album (Teil 4)	The Longest Single on Earth – Part 4
2005	Ich bin ene kölsche Jung	I'm a Boy from Cologne
2006	Meine Lieblingslieder	My Favourite Songs
2006	30 (Abschiedsalbum)	30 – Farewell Album
2007	Seine schönsten Balladen (mit 2 unveröffentlichten Titeln)	His Most Beautiful Ballads (with 2 unreleased tracks)
2007	Das letzte Konzert – Live – einfach geil!	The Last Concert – Live – Simply Cool
2008	Alles Maxi – Seine größten Erfolge	Everything Maxi – His Greatest Hits
2014	Einmal noch!	Once More!
2014	Wolles fröhliche Weihnachten	Wolle's Merry Christmas
2015	Brandneu	Brand-New
2016	Die Jahre mit dir	The Years with You
2018	Genau jetzt!	Right Now!
2021	Auf das Leben	Here's to Life
2023	Stark wie wir	Strong Like Us
2023	Immer wenn es schneit	Whenever It Snows

==== As the Pete Wolf Band ====
- Happy Man (2017)
- 2084 (2019)
