= The Masked Singer (German TV series) season 6 =

The Masked Singer
- Season 6
- Starring: Ruth Moschner; Rea Garvey; Various guests
- Hosted by: Matthias Opdenhövel; Thore Schölermann
- No. of contestants: 10
- Winner: Ella Endlich as "Zebra"
- Runner-up: Mark Keller as "Dornteufel"
- No. of episodes: 6

Release
- Original network: ProSieben
- Original release: 19 March – 23 April 2022

Season chronology
- ← Previous; Season 5 Next → Season 7

The sixth season of the German singing competition The Masked Singer premiered on 19 March 2022 on ProSieben. Ruth Moschner and Rea Garvey returned to the panel. Matthias Opdenhövel also returned as host. Thore Schölermann hosted only the first episode after Opdenhövel tested positive for COVID-19.

On 23 April 2022, the Zebra (singer Ella Endlich) was declared the winner and the Dornteufel (actor Mark Keller) was the runner-up.

== Panelists and host ==
Season 6 panelists and host

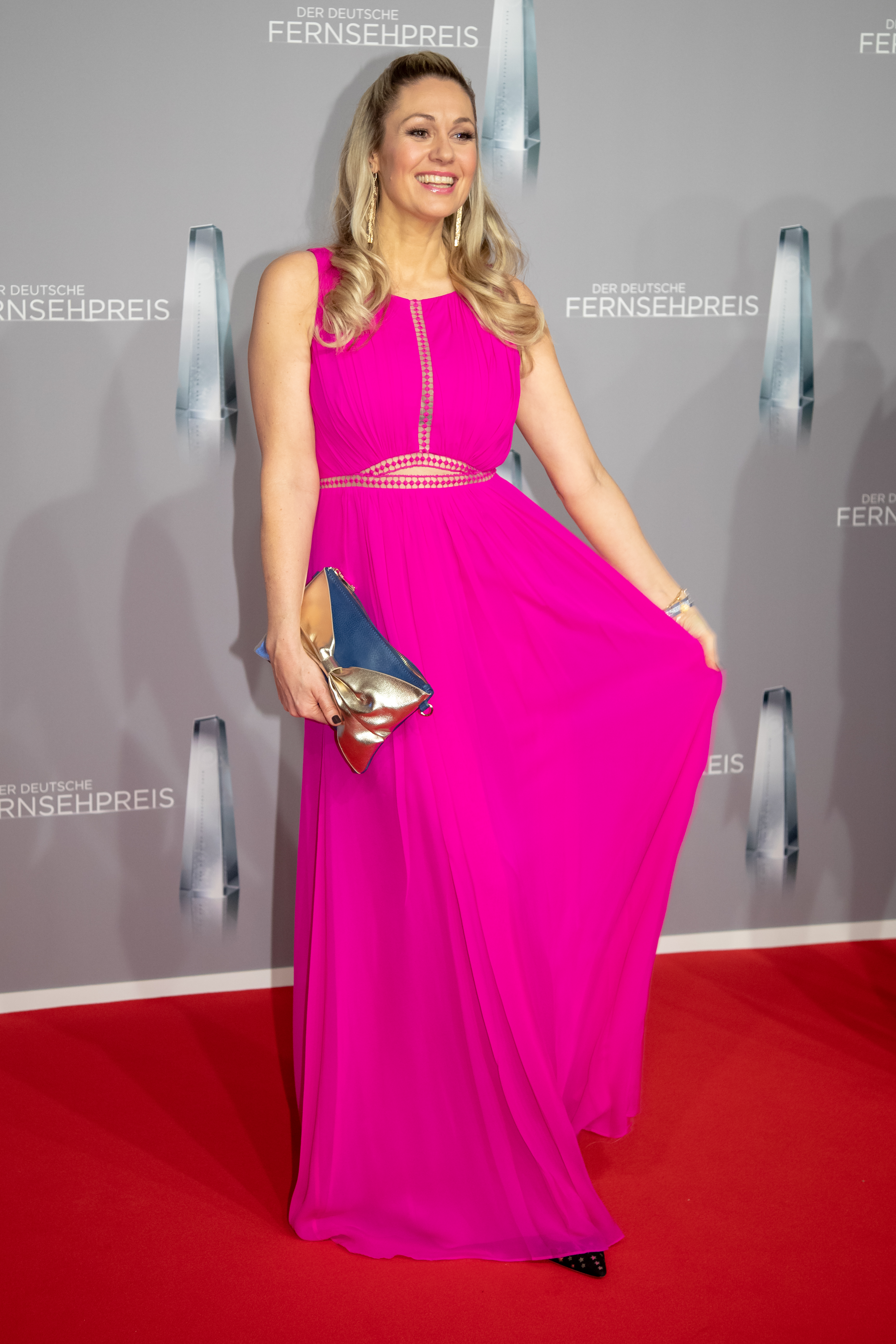
Ruth Moschner

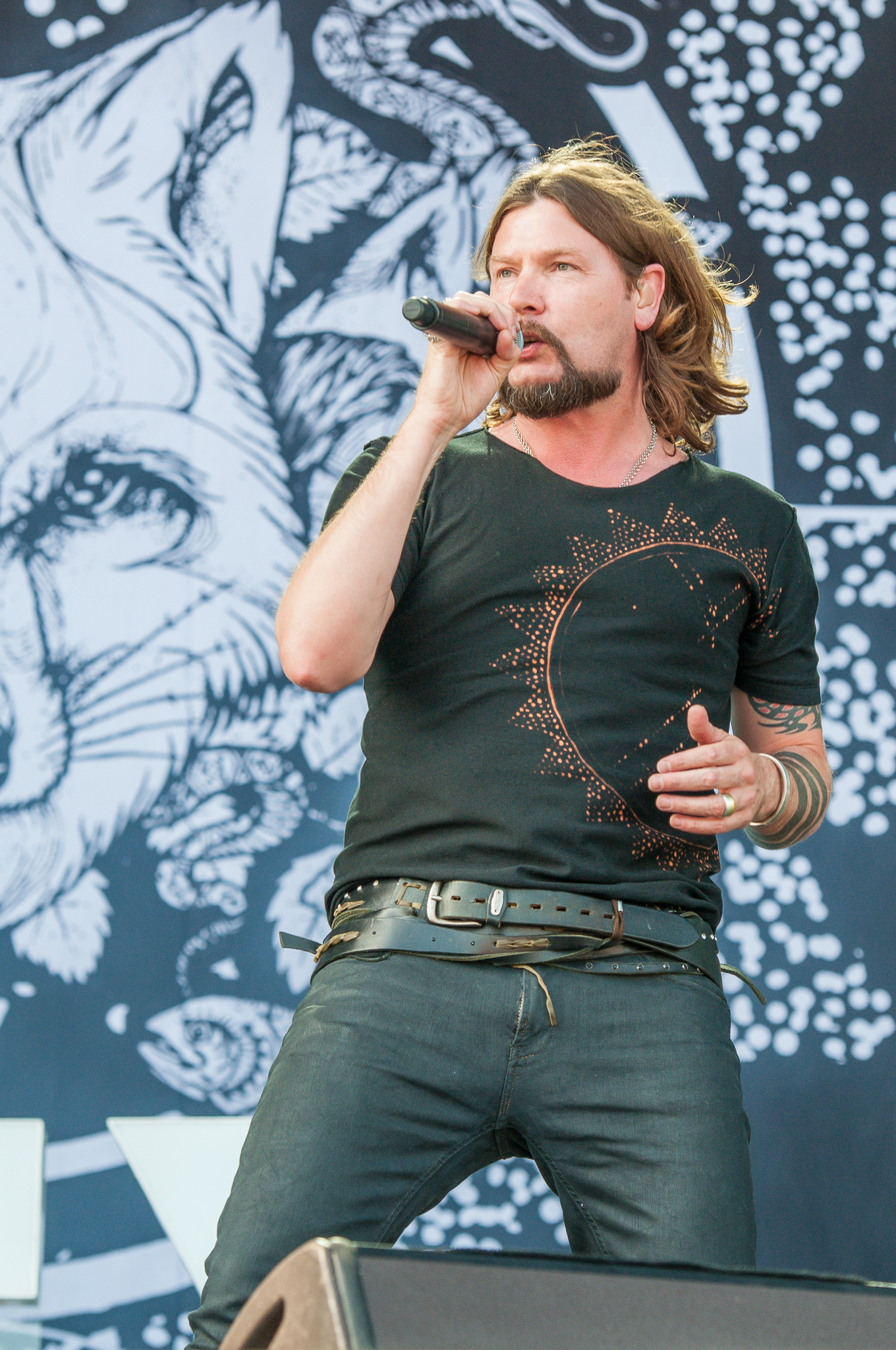
Rea Garvey

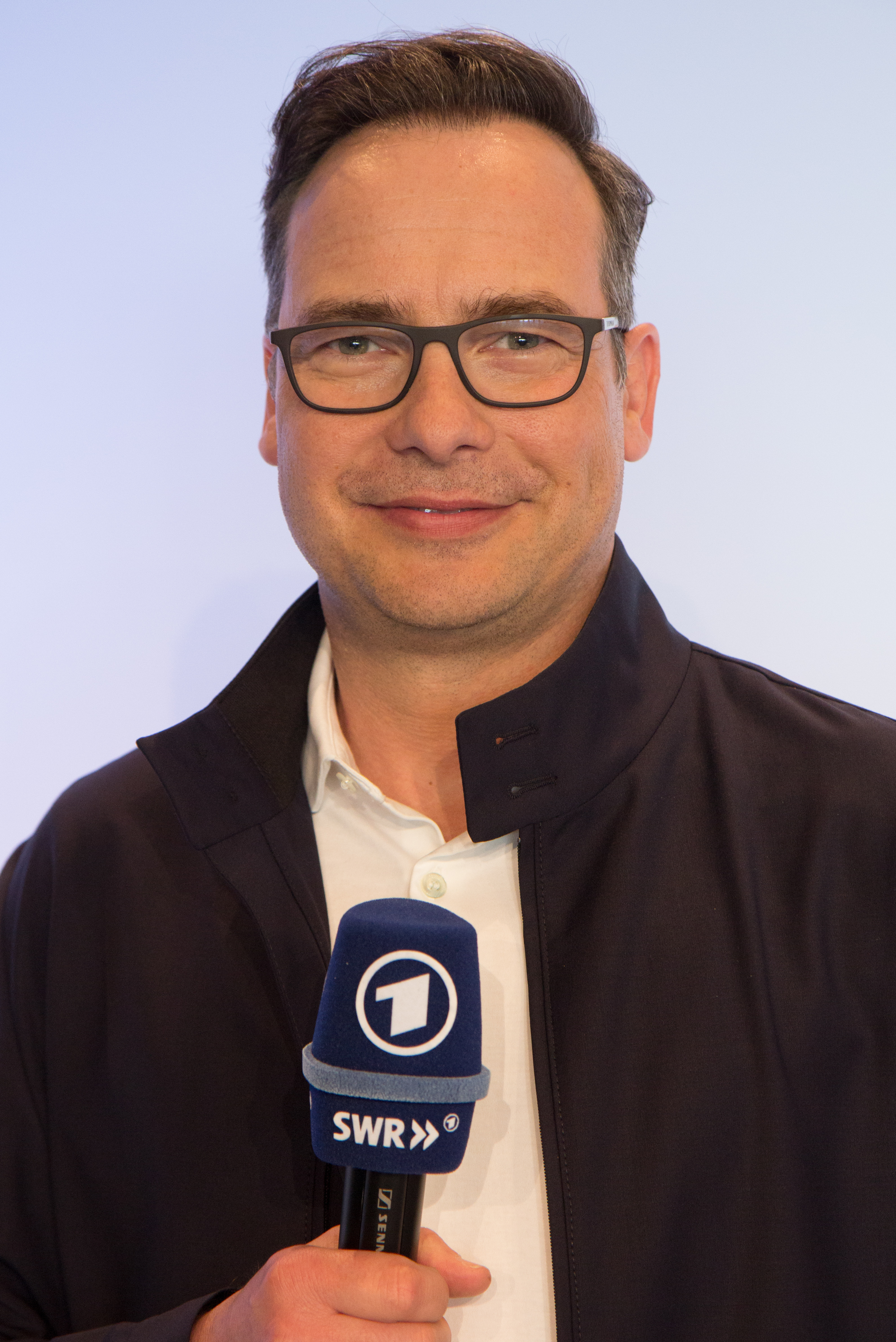
Matthias Opdenhövel

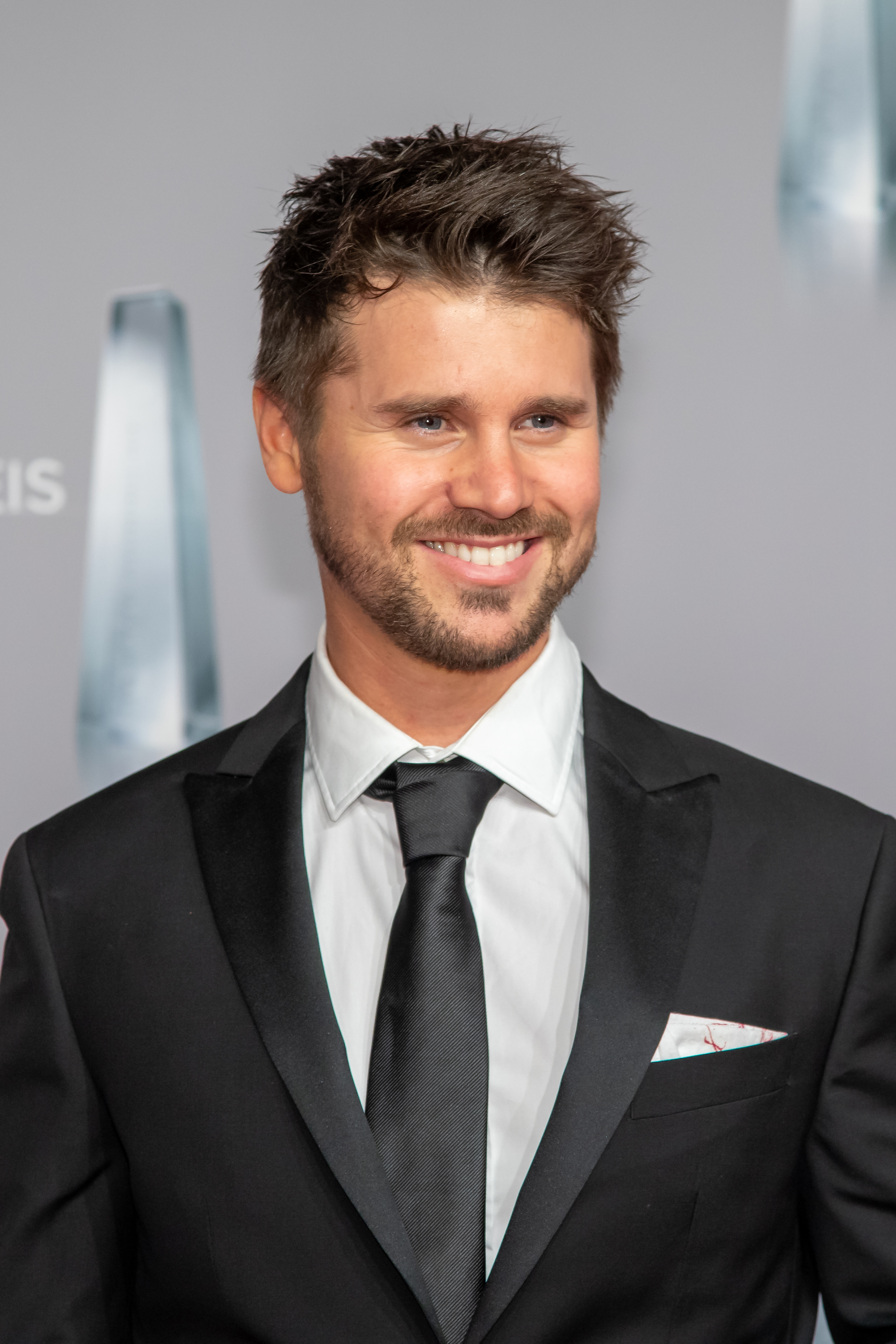
Thore Schölermann

TV Presenter Ruth Moschner and singer Rea Garvey both returned for their fifth and fourth season as panelists, respectively. Regular host Matthias Opdenhövel tested positive for COVID-19 a few days before production was set to begin in March 2022; consequently, Thore Schölermann guest hosted the first episode. Opdenhövel returned in the second episode.

As in previous seasons, a spin-off show named The Masked Singer - red. Special was aired after each live episode, hosted by Rebecca Mir (episode 1, 5), Annemarie Carpendale (episode 2, 4, 6) and Viviane Geppert (episode 3).

=== Guest panelists ===
Various guest panelists appeared as the third judge in the judging panel for one episode. These guest panelists included:

Season 6 guest panelists

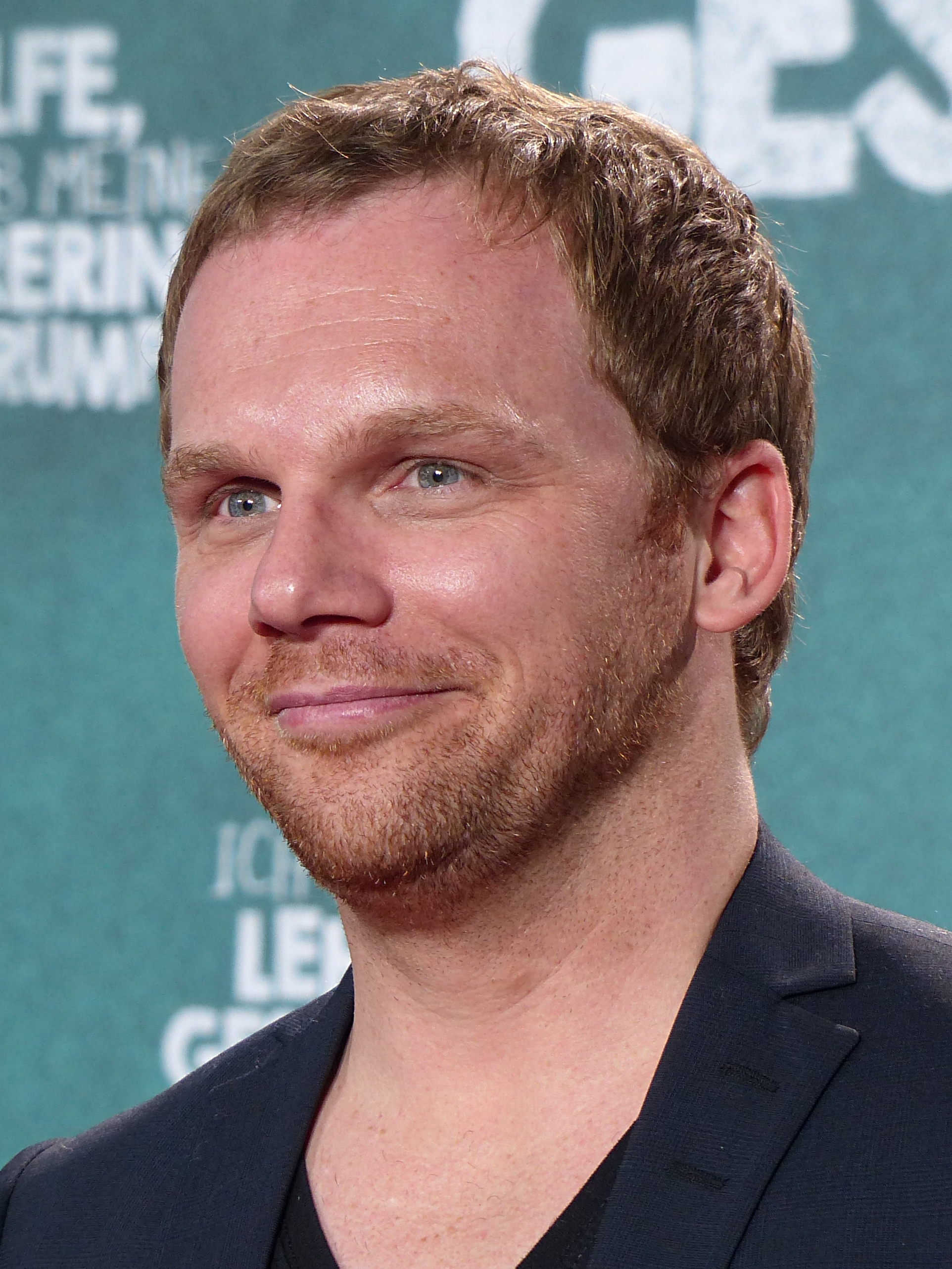
Ralf Schmitz (episode 1)

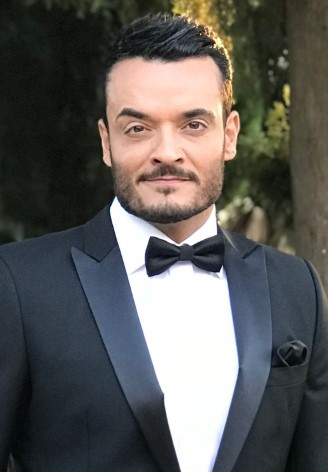
Giovanni Zarrella (episode 2)

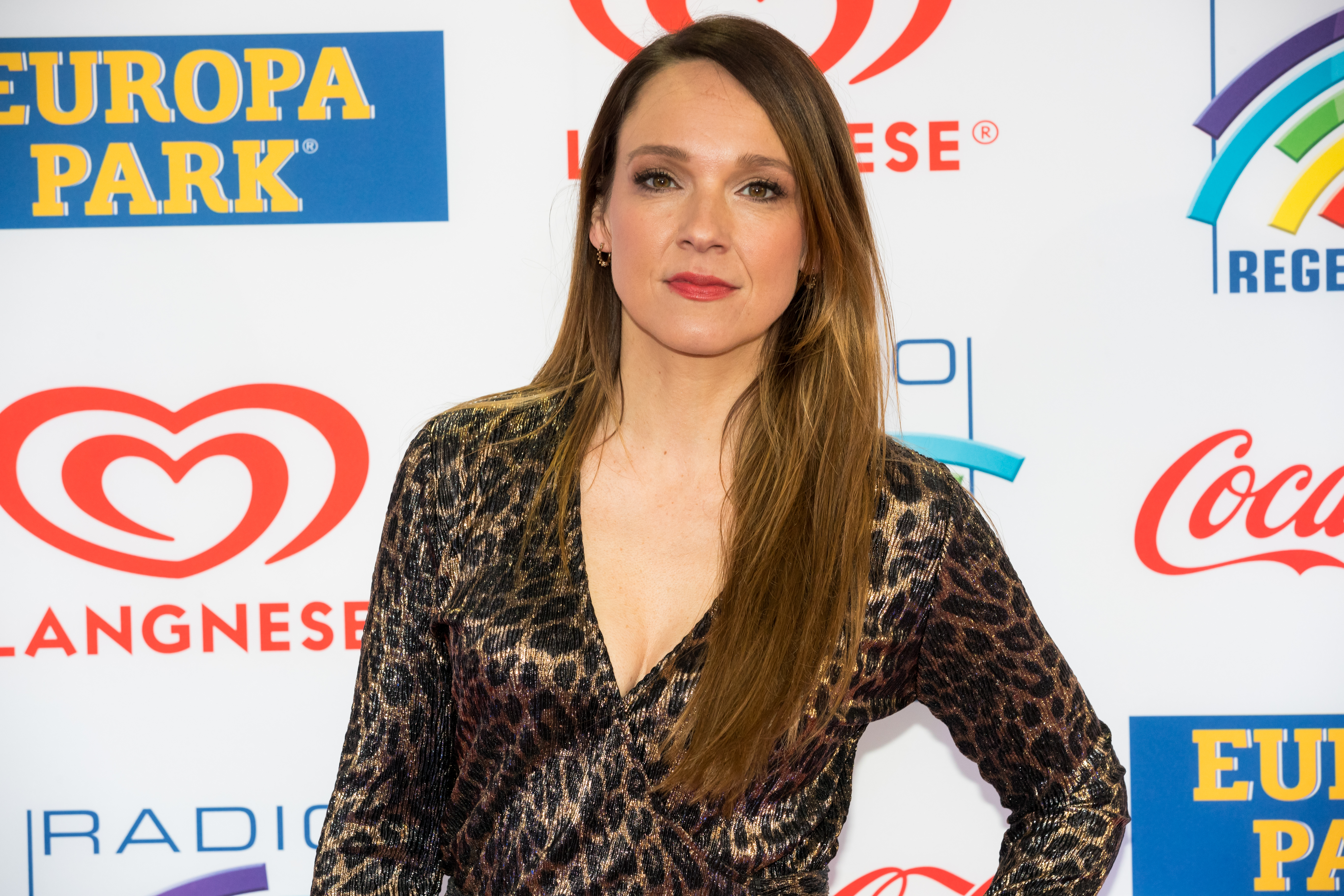
Carolin Kebekus (episode 3)

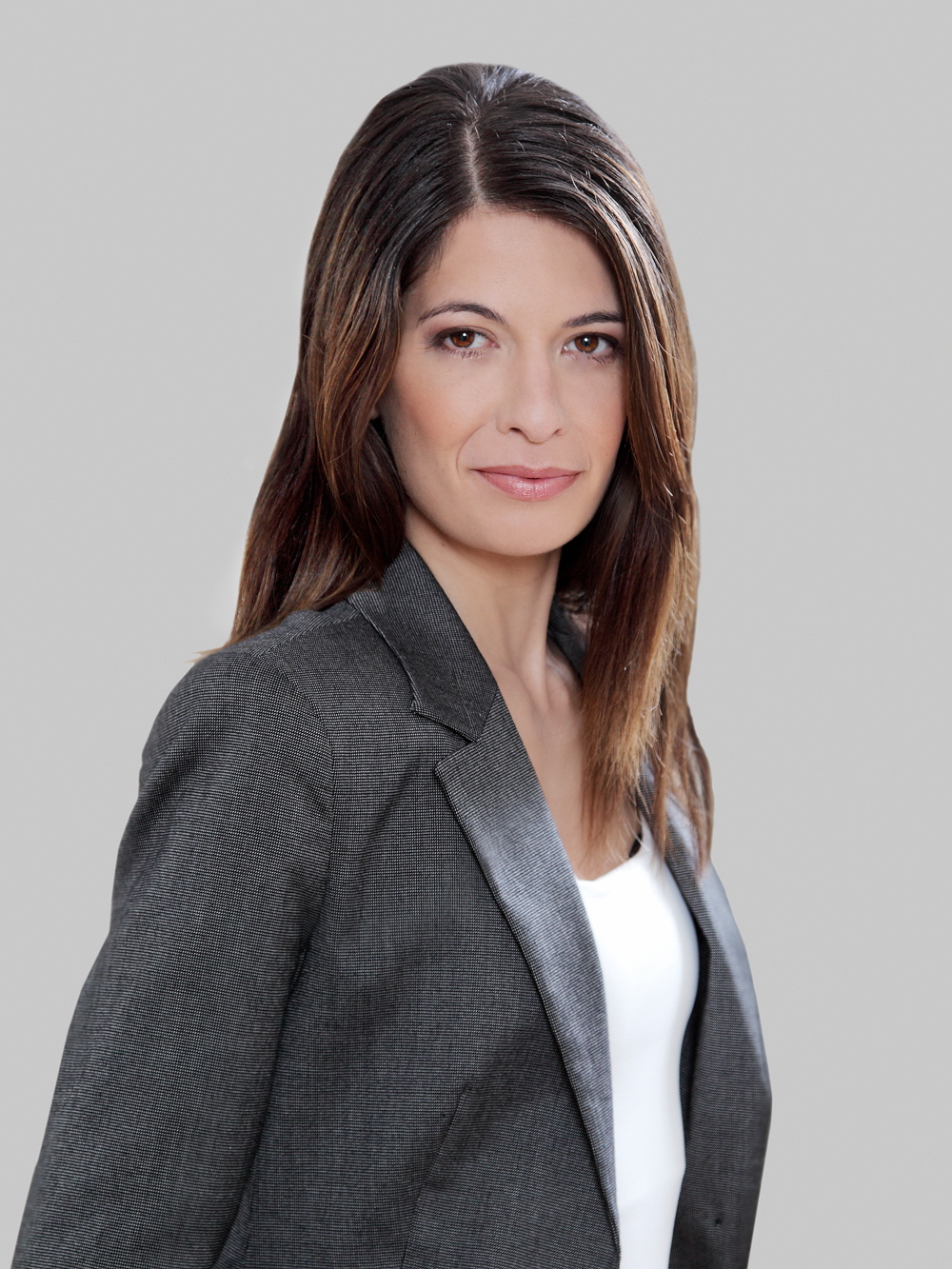
Linda Zervakis (episode 4)

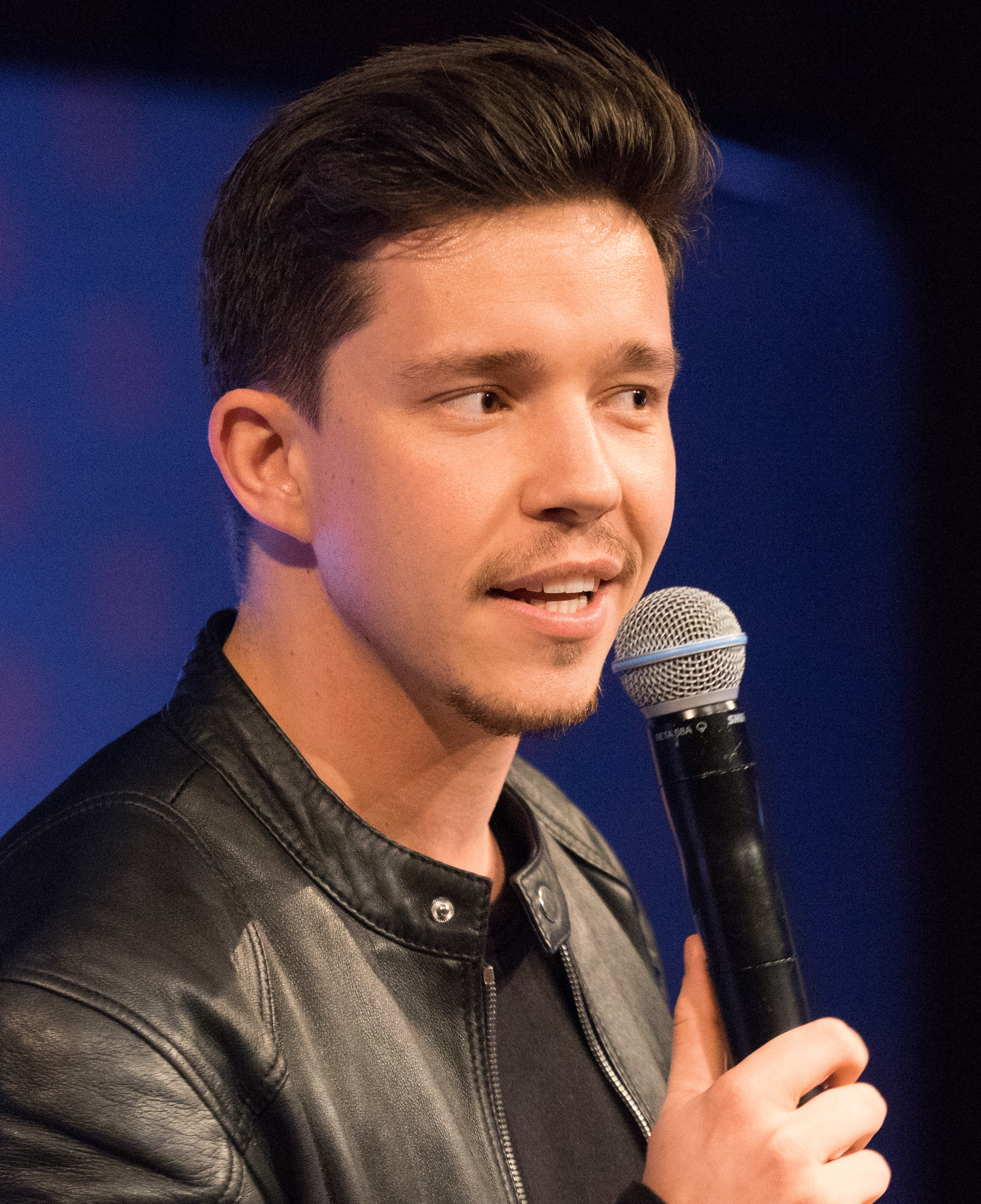
Nico Santos (episode 5)

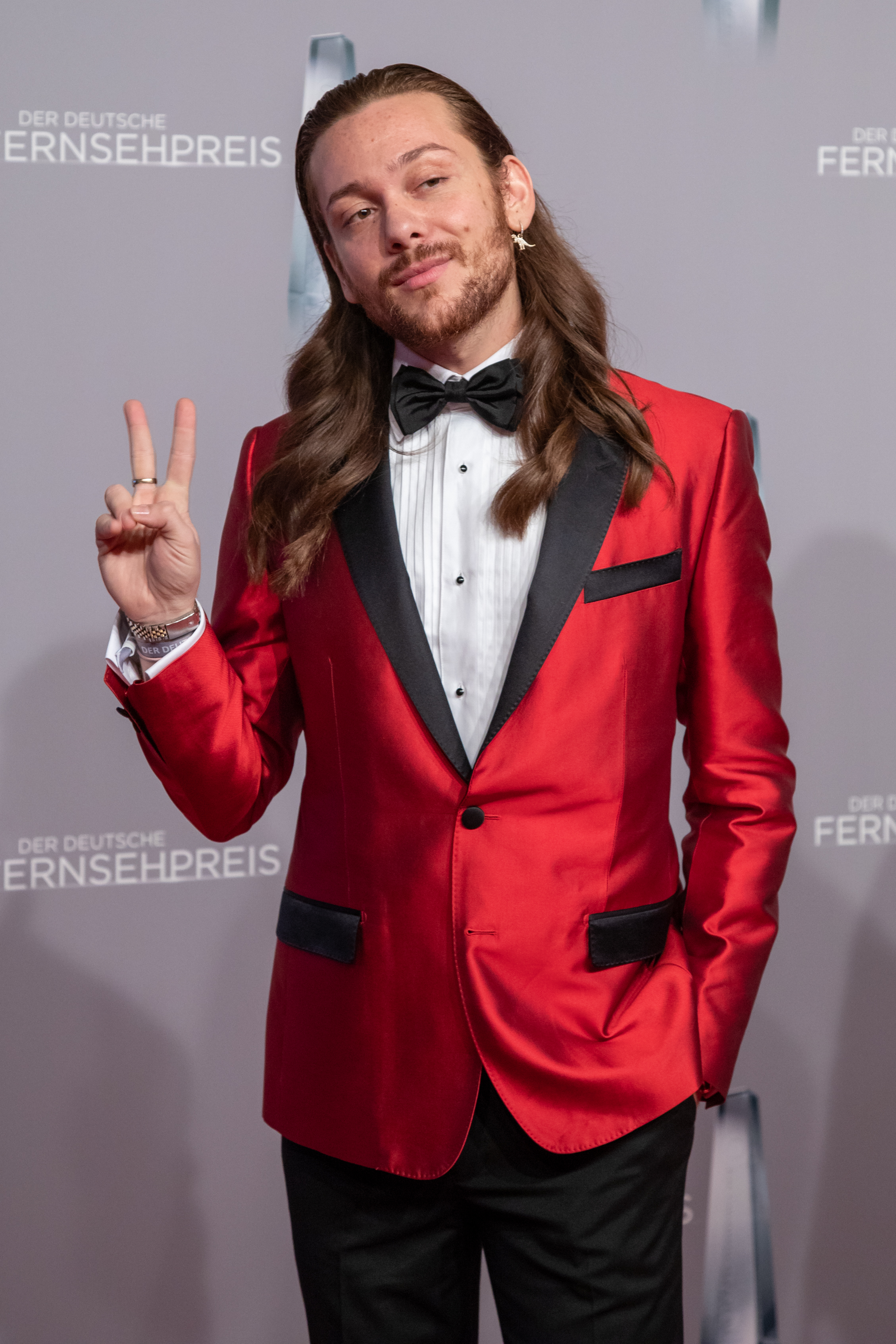
Riccardo Simonetti (episode 6)

Episode	Name	Notability	Ref.
1	Ralf Schmitz	Comedian, presenter	
2	Giovanni Zarrella	Singer, presenter	
3	Carolin Kebekus	Comedienne	
4	Linda Zervakis	Presenter, journalist	
5	Nico Santos	Singer, songwriter	
6	Riccardo Simonetti	Presenter, author	

== Contestants ==
Like in the previous seasons, the sixth season included 10 contestants. Children had until 20 November 2021 to send ProSieben drawings of costumes they would like to see for season 6. One mask from the submissions would appear as a costume in season six. The production chose the drawing of 10-year-old Emma, who had painted the Brilli mask. The most labor-intensive costume was the Dornteufel with 1000 hours of work, the easiest was the Seestern. In the second episode on 26 March 2022, Galax'Sis could not appear because the celebrity in this character was sick with COVID-19.

Results
Stage name	Celebrity	Notability	Live Episodes							
Stage name	Celebrity	Notability	1	2	3	4	5	6		
Stage name	Celebrity	Notability	1	2	3	4	5	A	B	C
Zebra	Ella Endlich	Singer	WIN	WIN	WIN	WIN	RISK	SAFE	SAFE	WINNER
Dornteufel "Thorny Devil"	Mark Keller	Actor	WIN	RISK	WIN	WIN	RISK	SAFE	SAFE	RUNNER-UP
Discokugel "Disco Ball"	Jeanette Biedermann	Singer	WIN	WIN	WIN	WIN	WIN	SAFE	THIRD	
Ork "Orc"	Nora Tschirner	Actress	RISK	WIN	WIN	RISK	WIN	OUT		
Seestern "Starfish"	Jasna Fritzi Bauer	Actress	WIN	RISK	RISK	RISK	OUT			
Gorilla	Rúrik Gíslason	Footballer	WIN	WIN	RISK	WIN	OUT			
Galax'Sis	Joana Zimmer	Singer	RISK	(Note: Galax'Sis gained immunity for one week due to contracting COVID and she was safe. She appeared in the next episode due to getting a negative test.)	RISK	OUT				
Koala	Paul Potts	Tenor	WIN	RISK	OUT					
Möwe "Seagull"	Cherno Jobatey	Journalist	RISK	OUT						
Brilli	Jeannine Michaelsen	Presenter	OUT							

The masked singer won their face-off and remained in the competition.
The masked singer lost their face-off and was in the bottom four/three/two, but was not eliminated.
The masked singer was safe from elimination.
The masked singer was eliminated from the competition and unmasked upon their elimination.
The masked singer did not perform.
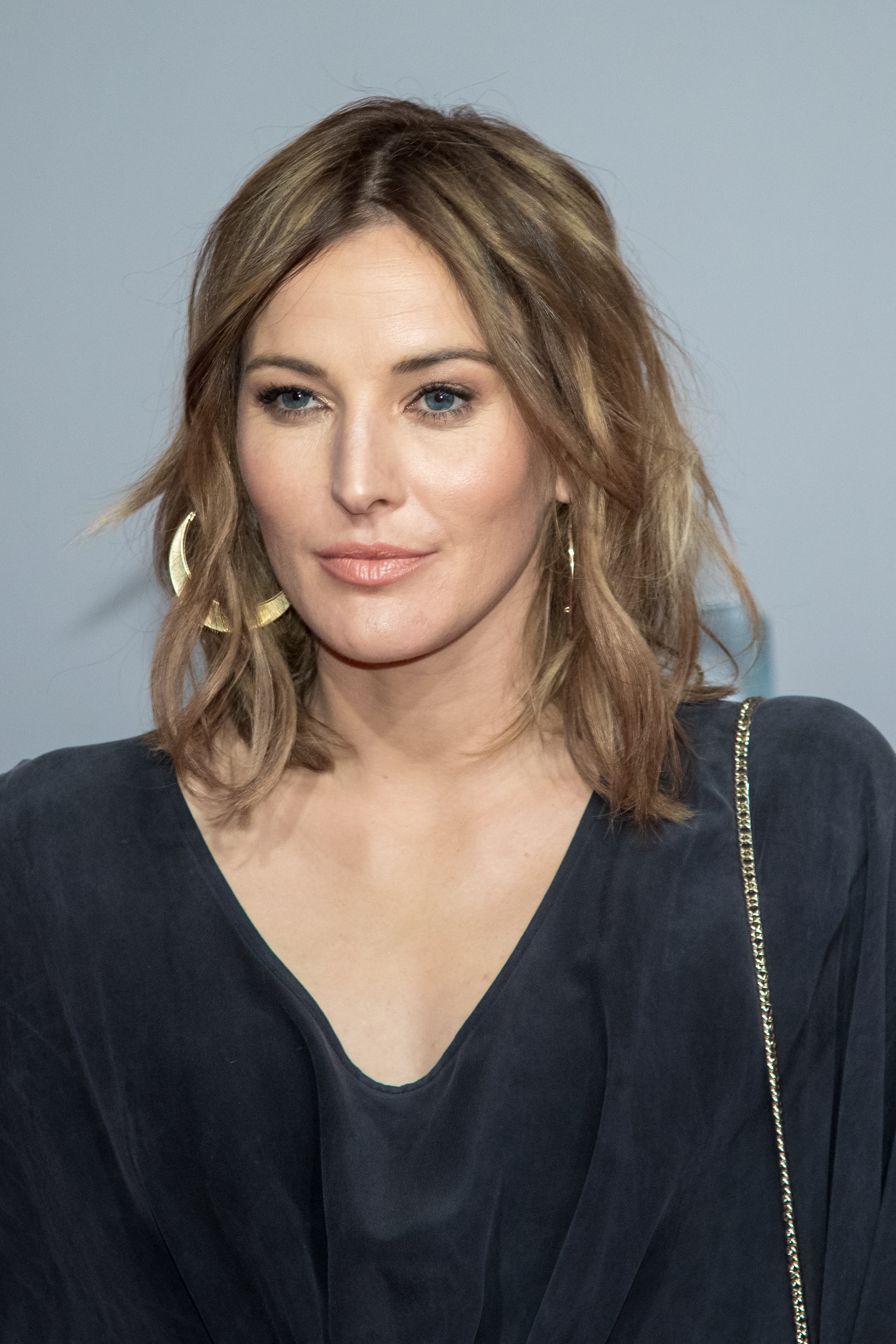
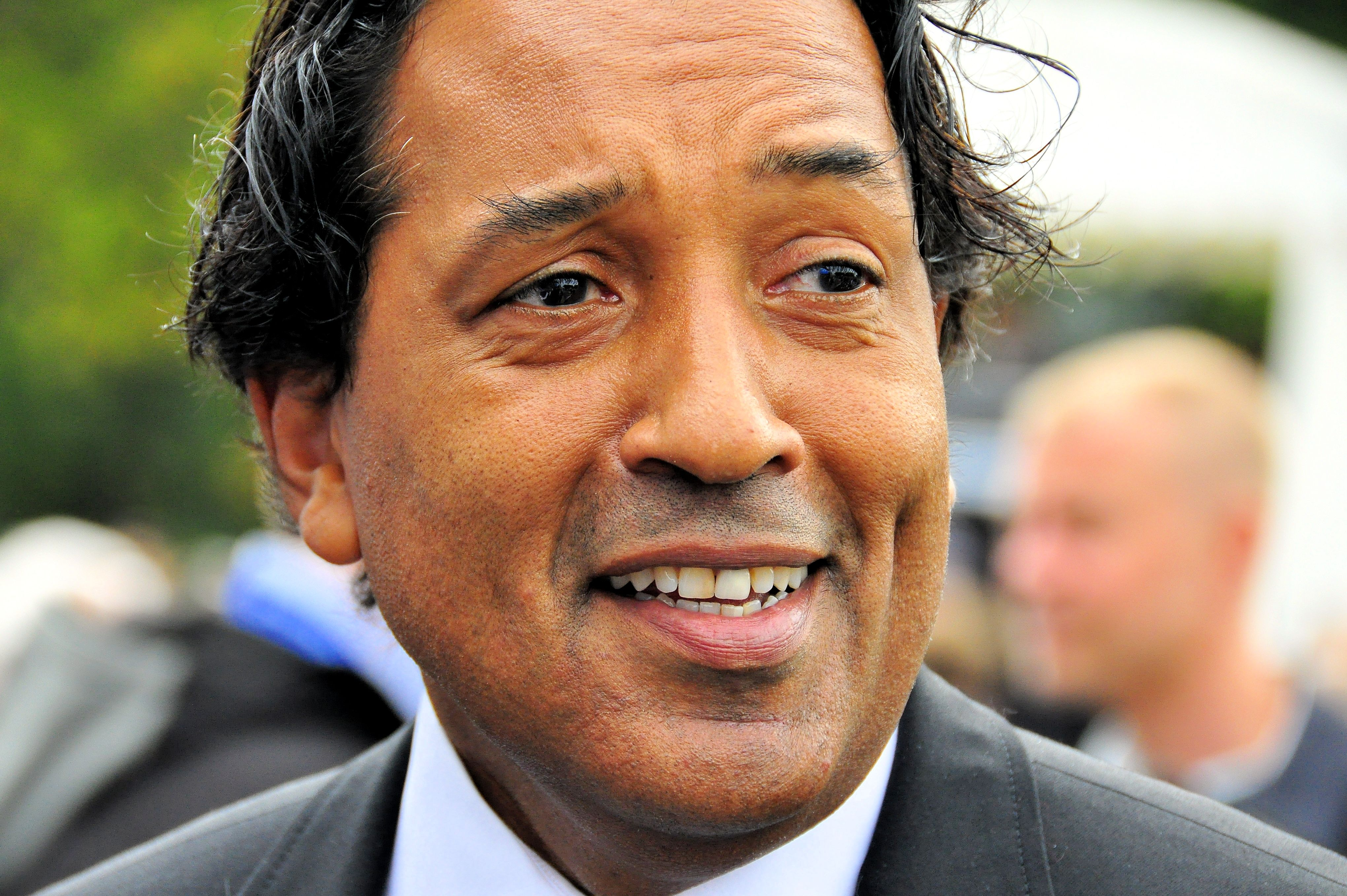
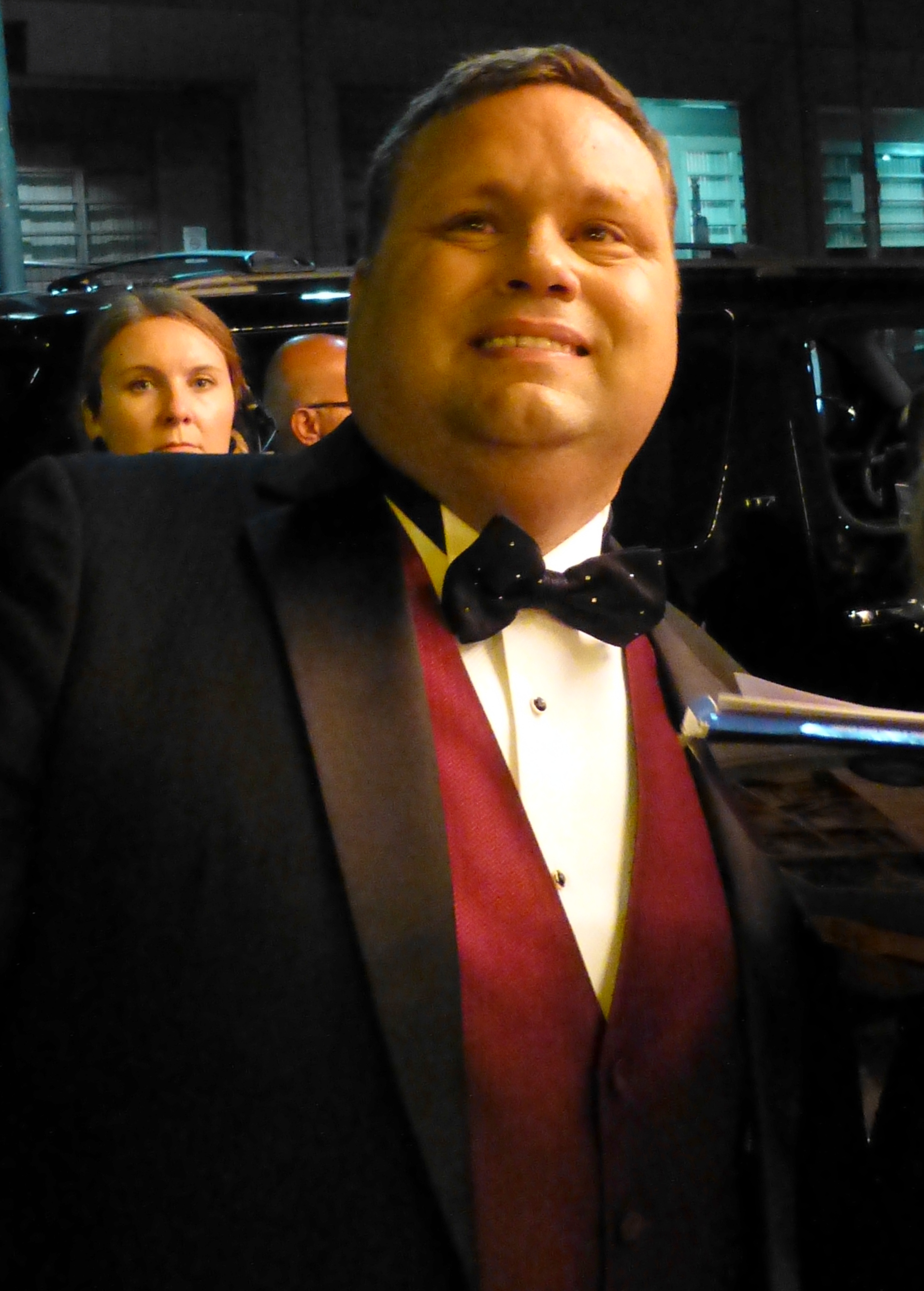
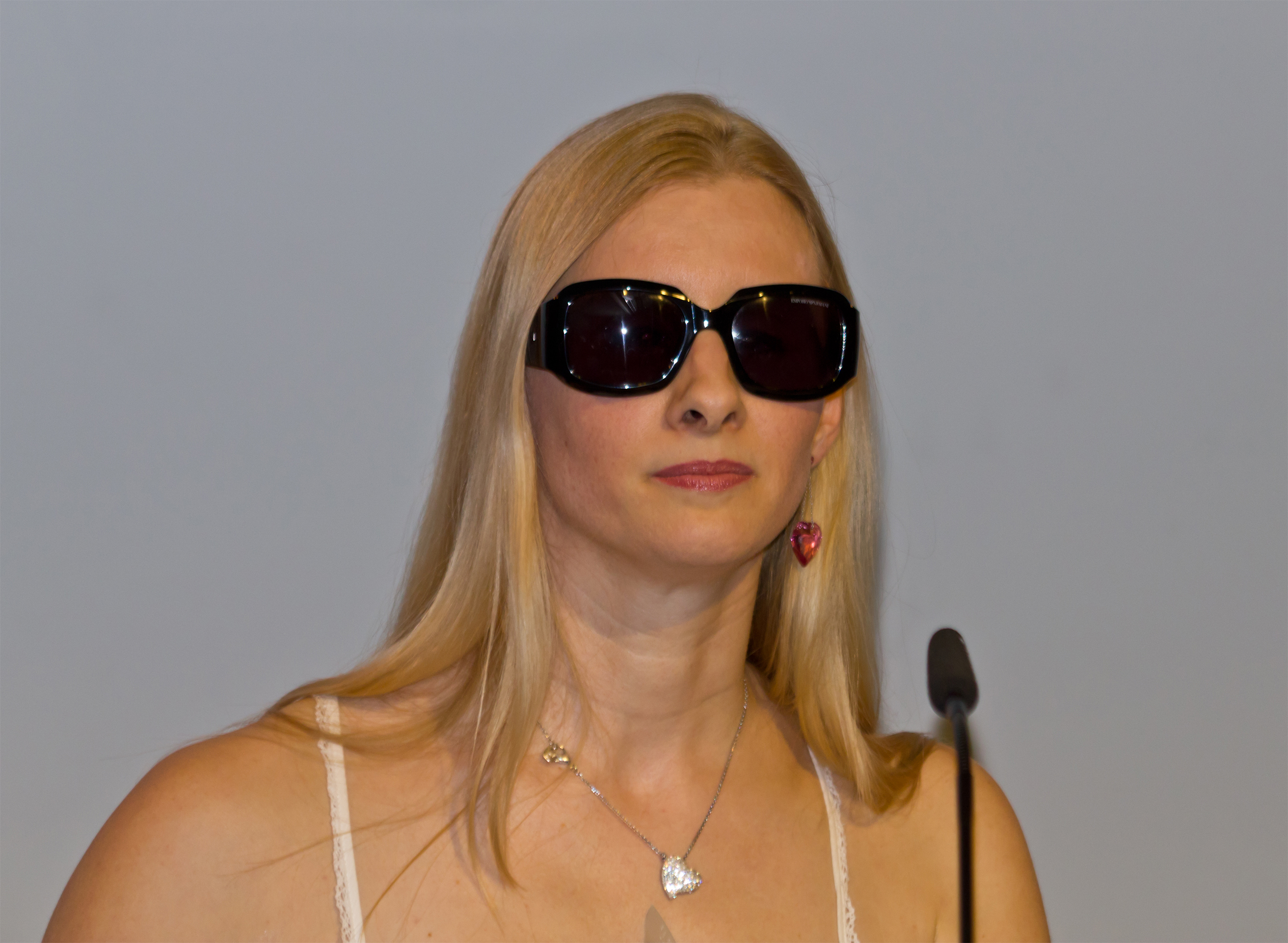
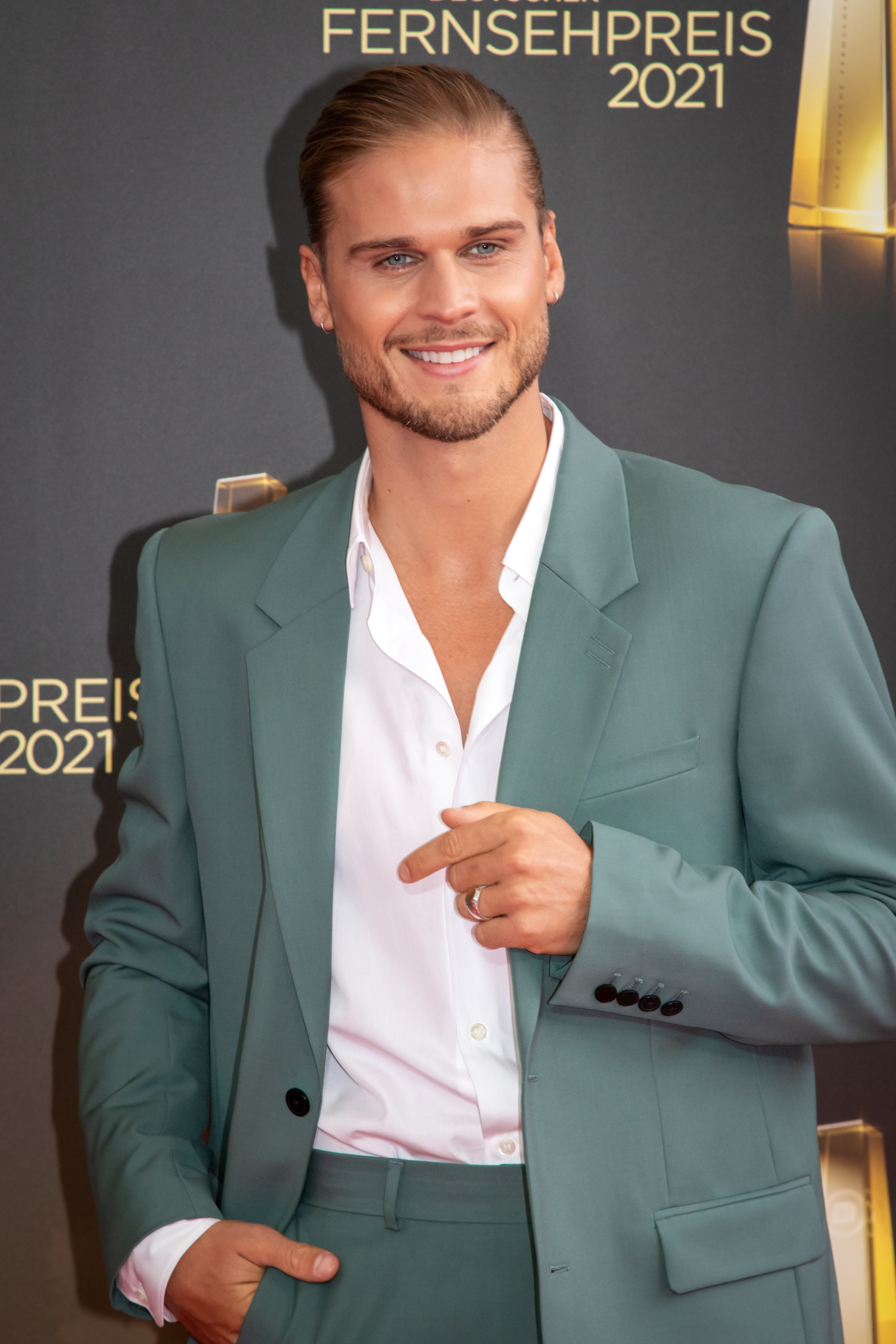
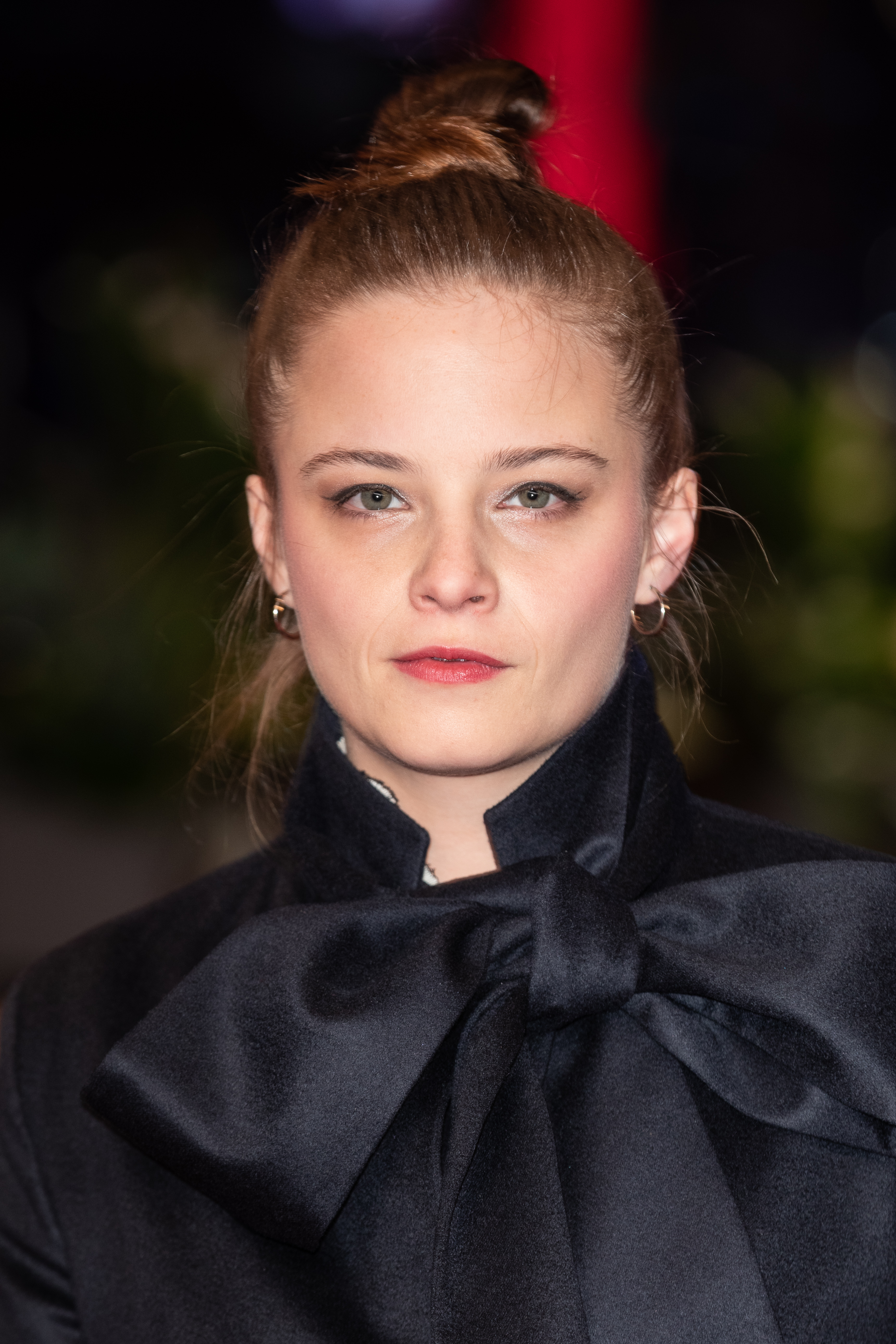
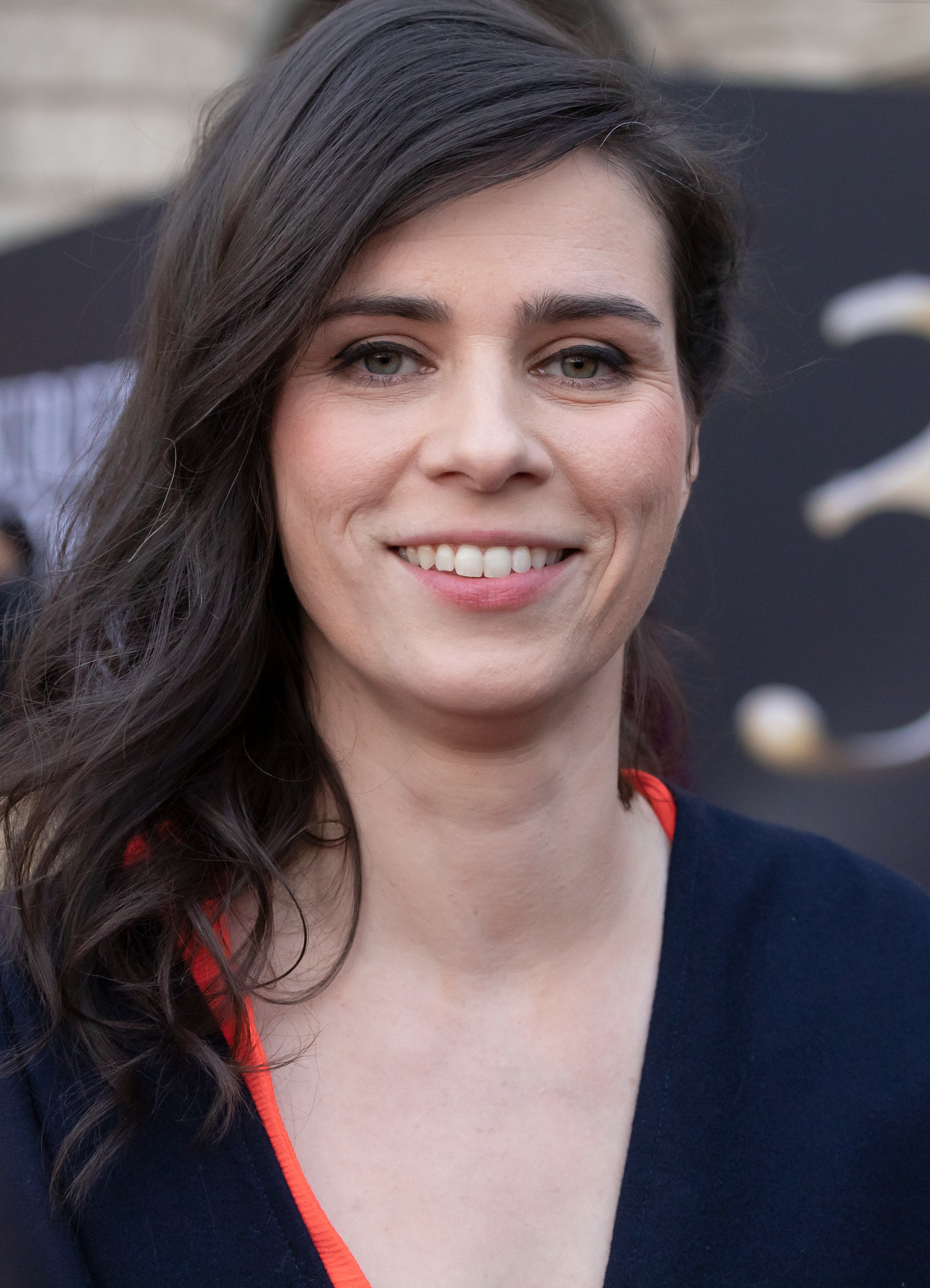
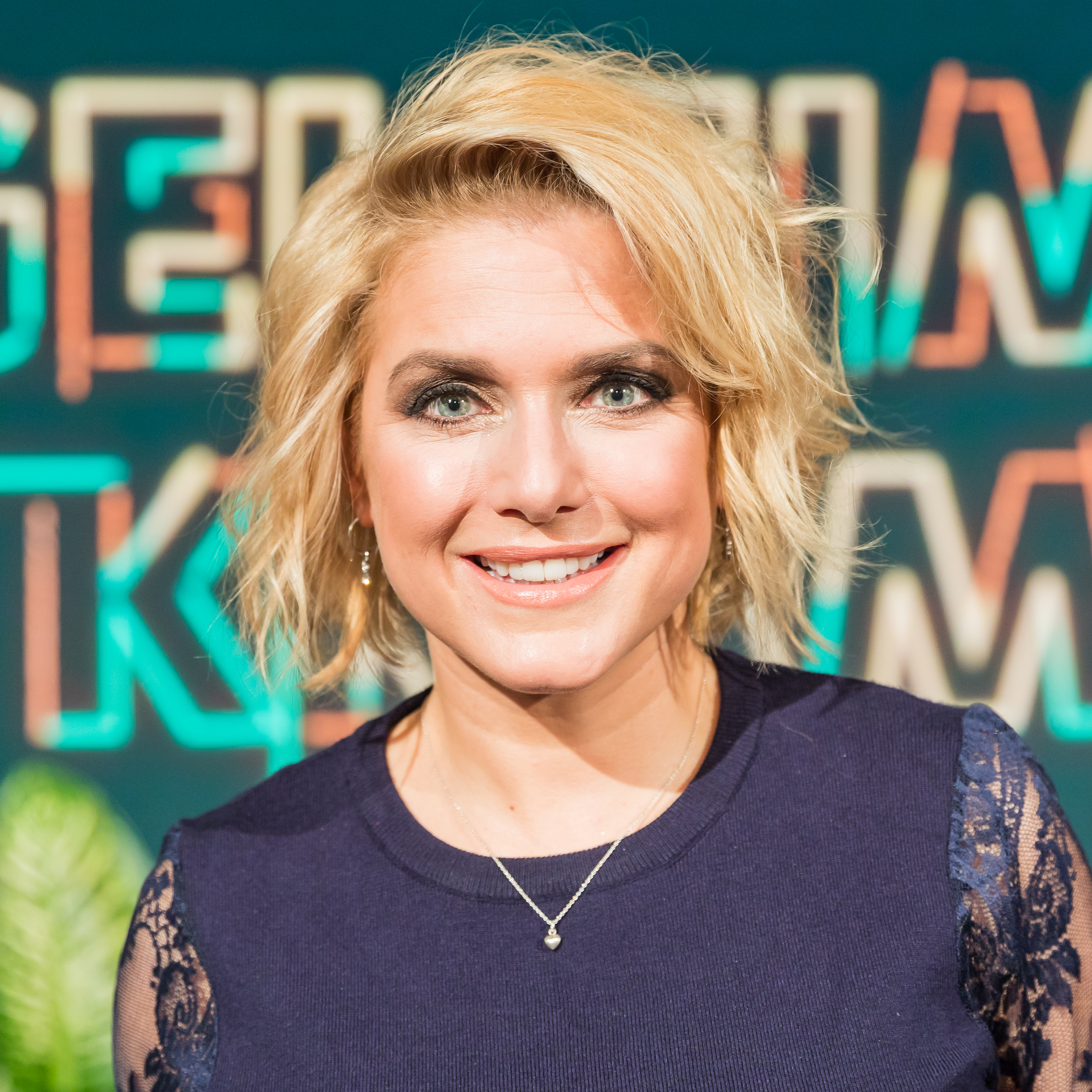
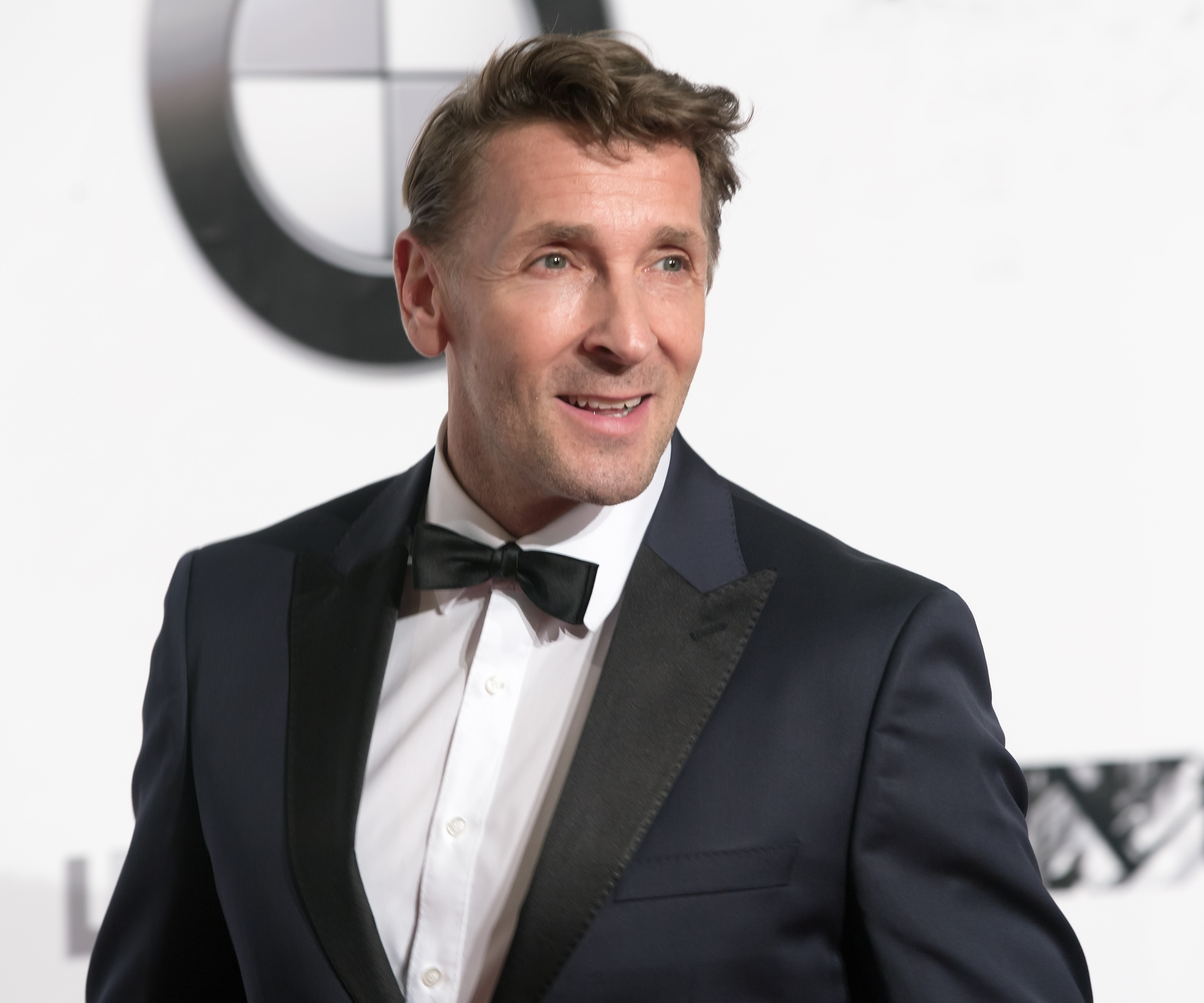
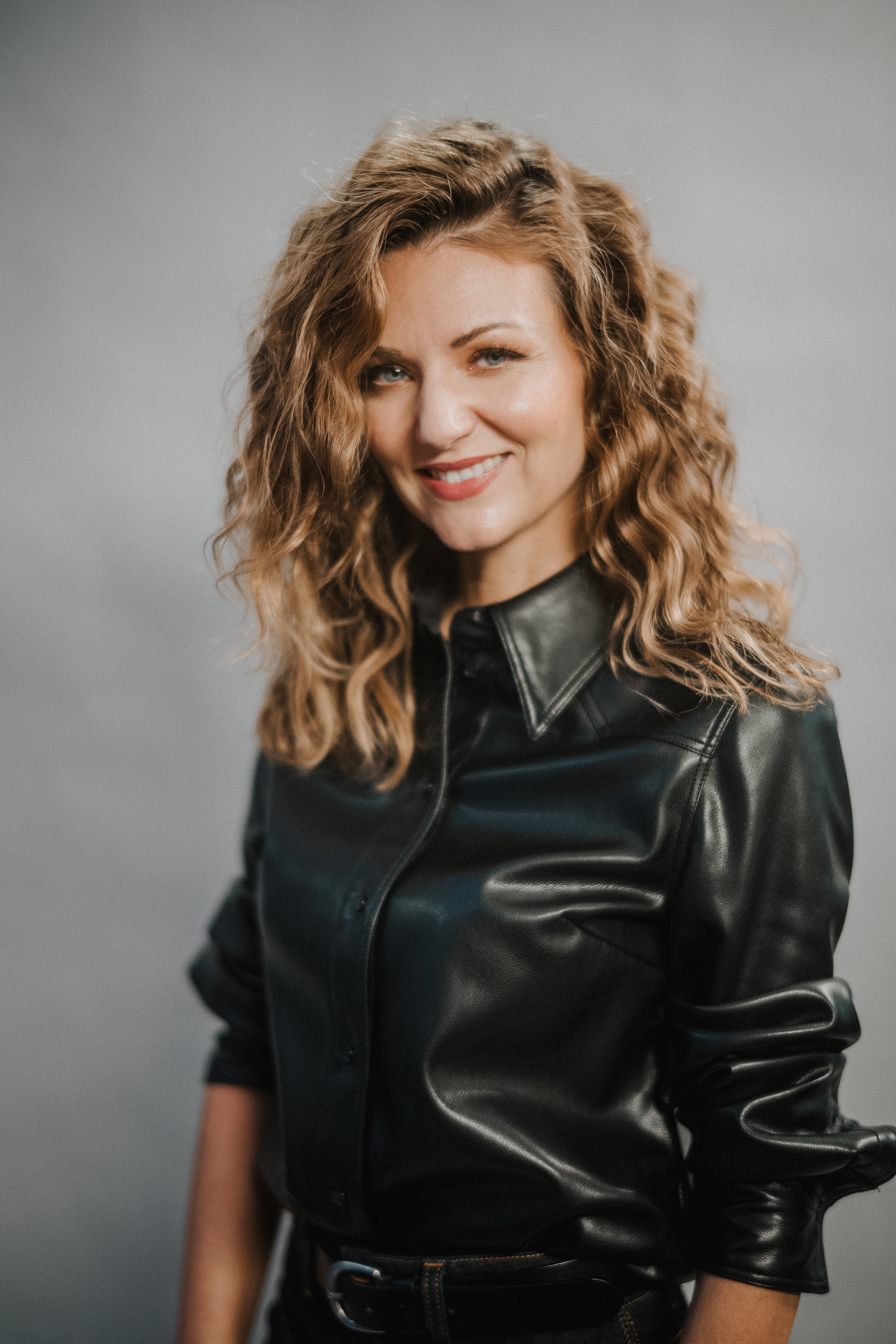
The celebrities who have competed in the sixth season of The Masked Singer, pictured in order of elimination (l-r):
Jeannine Michaelsen ("Brilli"), Cherno Jobatey ("Möwe"), Paul Potts ("Koala"), Joana Zimmer ("Galax'Sis"), Rúrik Gíslason ("Gorilla"), Jasna Fritzi Bauer ("Seestern"), Nora Tschirner ("Ork"), Jeanette Biedermann ("Discokugel"), Mark Keller ("Dornteufel"), Ella Endlich ("Zebra")

== Episodes ==
=== Week 1 (19 March) ===
Performances on the first live episode
#	Stage name	Song	Identity	Result
1	Ork	"Zitti e buoni" by Måneskin	undisclosed	RISK
2	Zebra	"Tik Tok" by Kesha	undisclosed	WIN
3	Seestern	"Maybe This Time" by Liza Minnelli	undisclosed	WIN
4	Brilli	"A Kind of Magic" by Queen	Jeannine Michaelsen	OUT
5	Koala	"Take On Me" by A-ha	undisclosed	WIN
6	Galax'Sis	"Il dolce suono" from Lucia di Lammermoor/"Floating Through Space" by Sia & David Guetta	undisclosed	RISK
7	Möwe	"Wellerman" by Nathan Evans/"Gettin' Jiggy wit It" by Will Smith	undisclosed	RISK
8	Dornteufel	"Young and Beautiful" by Lana Del Rey	undisclosed	WIN
9	Gorilla	"Basket Case" by Green Day	undisclosed	WIN
10	Discokugel	"I Will Survive" by Gloria Gaynor	undisclosed	WIN

=== Week 2 (26 March) ===
Performances on the second live episode (Note: There was 8 performances instead of 9, due to the celebrity behind Galax'Sis having to quarantine due contracting COVID. She was safe and appeared in the next episode due to getting a negative test.)
#	Stage name	Song	Identity	Result
1	Seestern	"Masterpiece" by Jessie J	undisclosed	RISK
2	Koala	"Hold the Line" by Toto	undisclosed	RISK
3	Ork	"Şımarık" by Tarkan	undisclosed	WIN
4	Zebra	"I Am Woman" by Emmy Meli	undisclosed	WIN
5	Discokugel	"September" by Earth, Wind & Fire	undisclosed	WIN
6	Gorilla	"Leave a Light On" by Tom Walker	undisclosed	WIN
7	Möwe	"There Is a Party" by DJ BoBo	Cherno Jobatey	OUT
8	Dornteufel	"Uprising" by Muse	undisclosed	RISK

=== Week 3 (2 April) ===
Performances on the third live episode
#	Stage name	Song	Identity	Result
1	Ork	"Just a Girl" by No Doubt	undisclosed	WIN
2	Gorilla	"Livin' on a Prayer" by Bon Jovi	undisclosed	RISK
3	Koala	"Cold Heart" by Elton John & Dua Lipa	Paul Potts	OUT
4	Discokugel	"Flower Duet" by Léo Delibes/"Wild World" by Cat Stevens	undisclosed	WIN
5	Seestern	"Fame" by Irene Cara	undisclosed	RISK
6	Dornteufel	"Man on a Mission" by Oh The Larceny	undisclosed	WIN
7	Galax'Sis	"In the Dark" by Purple Disco Machine & Sophie and the Giants	undisclosed	RISK
8	Zebra	"Rise Up" by Andra Day	undisclosed	WIN

=== Week 4 (9 April) ===
Performances on the fourth live episode
#	Stage name	Song	Result	
1	Dornteufel	"Copacabana" by Barry Manilow	WIN	
2	Seestern	"On the Floor" by Jennifer Lopez feat. Pitbull	RISK	
3	Zebra	"...Baby One More Time" by Britney Spears	WIN	
4	Galax'Sis	"Toy" by Netta	RISK	
5	Gorilla	"Superstition" by Stevie Wonder	WIN	
6	Ork	"When the Party's Over" by Billie Eilish	RISK	
7	Discokugel	"Higher Power" by Coldplay	WIN	
Sing-off details			Identity	Result
1	Seestern	"This Is Me" by Keala Settle	undisclosed	SAFE
2	Galax'Sis	"Dream On" by Aerosmith	Joana Zimmer	OUT
3	Ork	"Entre Dos Tierras" by Héroes del Silencio	undisclosed	SAFE

=== Week 5 (16 April) ===
Performances on the fifth live episode
#	Stage name	Song	Identity	Result
1	Discokugel	"Lady Marmalade" by Labelle	undisclosed	WIN
2	Dornteufel	"Dance with Somebody" by Mando Diao	undisclosed	RISK
3	Zebra	"Teenage Dirtbag" by Wheatus	undisclosed	RISK
4	Ork	"Mein Herr" from Cabaret	undisclosed	WIN
5	Gorilla	"I Want It That Way" by Backstreet Boys	Rúrik Gíslason	OUT
6	Seestern	"Starlight" by Muse	undisclosed	RISK
Sing-off details			Identity	Result
1	Dornteufel	"Hold Me Now" by Johnny Logan	undisclosed	SAFE
2	Seestern	"Don't Rain on My Parade" by Barbra Streisand	Jasna Fritzi Bauer	OUT
3	Zebra	"Greatest Love of All" by Whitney Houston	undisclosed	SAFE

=== Week 6 (23 April) ===
- Group number: "Don't Stop Believin'" by Journey

==== Round One ====
Performances on the final live episode – round one
#	Stage name	Song	Identity	Result
1	Zebra	"Addicted to You" by Avicii	undisclosed	SAFE
2	Dornteufel	"Hound Dog"/"Blue Suede Shoes"/"Tutti Frutti" by Elvis Presley	undisclosed	SAFE
3	Discokugel	"My Hero" by Foo Fighters	undisclosed	SAFE
4	Ork	"Vökuró" by Björk	Nora Tschirner	OUT

==== Round Two ====
Performances on the final live episode – round two
#	Stage name	Song	Identity	Result
1	Discokugel	"Golden Slumbers" by The Beatles	Jeanette Biedermann	THIRD
2	Dornteufel	"Enjoy the Silence" by Depeche Mode	undisclosed	SAFE
3	Zebra	"Without You" by Badfinger	undisclosed	SAFE

==== Round Three ====
Performances on the final live episode – round three
#	Stage name	Song	Identity	Result
1	Dornteufel	"Copacabana" by Barry Manilow	Mark Keller	RUNNER-UP
2	Zebra	"Rise Up" by Andra Day	Ella Endlich	WINNER

== Reception ==
=== Ratings ===
Episode	Original airdate	Timeslot	Viewers (in millions)		Share (in %)		Source
Episode	Original airdate	Timeslot	Household	Adults 14-49	Household	Adults 14-49	Source
1	19 March 2022	Saturday 8:15 pm	2.46	1.27	9.7	21.3	
2	26 March 2022	Saturday 8:15 pm	2.31	1.12	9.3	19.2	
3	2 April 2022	Saturday 8:15 pm	2.23	1.14	8.1	18.0	
4	9 April 2022	Saturday 8:15 pm	2.25	1.12	8.5	18.1	
5	16 April 2022	Saturday 8:15 pm	1.71	0.77	7.4	15.4	
6	23 April 2022	Saturday 8:15 pm	2.48	1.22	10.3	20.7	
Average			2.24	1.11	8.8	18.8	
