= Alphonso Williams =

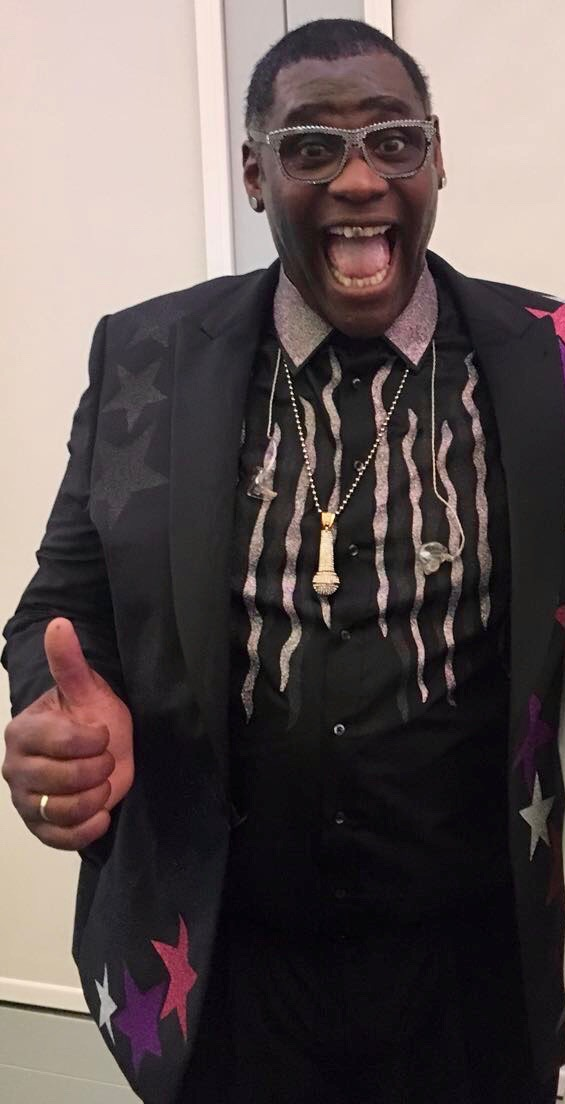
- Williams in 2017

Background information
- Also known as: Mr. Bling Bling
- Born: 20 July 1962; Detroit, Michigan, U.S.
- Died: 12 October 2019 (aged 57) Hamburg, Germany
- Genres: Soul
- Occupation: Singer
- Years active: 1980s–2019
- Label: Universal Music Germany

Alphonso Williams (20 July 1962 – 12 October 2019) was an American soul singer, active in Germany. He won the fourteenth season of Deutschland sucht den Superstar. During his participation in DSDS, he came up with the stage name Mr. Bling Bling, which he then continued to use.

== Biography ==
Williams was the youngest of twelve children. His father Archie Williams was a Baptist minister. Even as a child, Alphonso spent a large part of his free time in his father's church, where he came into contact with music at an early age. He sang in the gospel choir with his siblings. After graduating from high school, he enlisted in the United States Army and was transferred to the Lucius D. Clay barracks in Garlstedt near Bremen in 1980. His tenure ended in 1983. He was married and the father of two children.

== Musical career ==
With his son Raphael, who was born in Oldenburg in 1987, he founded the duo "Father & Son". The record company Jay Kay Records released the song "Footsteps in My Heart" in 2005 with the duo. In 2008, they took part in Das Supertalent. In 2014, the two went their separate ways musically. In 2012, Alphonso Williams took part in the impersonator talent show My Name Is, where he presented George McCrae's song Rock Your Baby.

=== Deutschland sucht den Superstar ===
In 2017, Williams was able to convince the jury at the casting of the fourteenth season of Deutschland sucht den Superstar with Let's Get it On by Marvin Gaye. Although he received good reviews from the jury in the recall in Dubai, RTL announced his departure one day before the live shows. When his departure from the first motto show was left without a reason, a shitstorm developed in the social networks, prompting RTL to issue a wildcard. Williams won the online voting with 91 percent of the votes. On 5 May 2017 he released his Idol finale song What Becomes of the Broken Hearted, a cover version of Jimmy Ruffin's song. The following day, he was voted the show's winner by viewers with 40.54% of the calls. The prize money was 500,000 euros. In addition, he received a record deal with Universal Music.

At 54, Williams was the oldest ever winner of Deutschland sucht den Superstar. With the 15th season in the following year, the upper age limit for candidates was lowered back to 30 years.

=== After DSDS ===
In March 2018, Williams released his first original song, Everything Changes. In August, he took part in the sixth season of Promi Big Brother and placed third.

The Christmas single Christmas in Our Hearts was released in November 2018. In December, Williams completed several performances in Las Vegas; producer John Stuart had offered him corresponding shows two months earlier.

== Illness and death ==
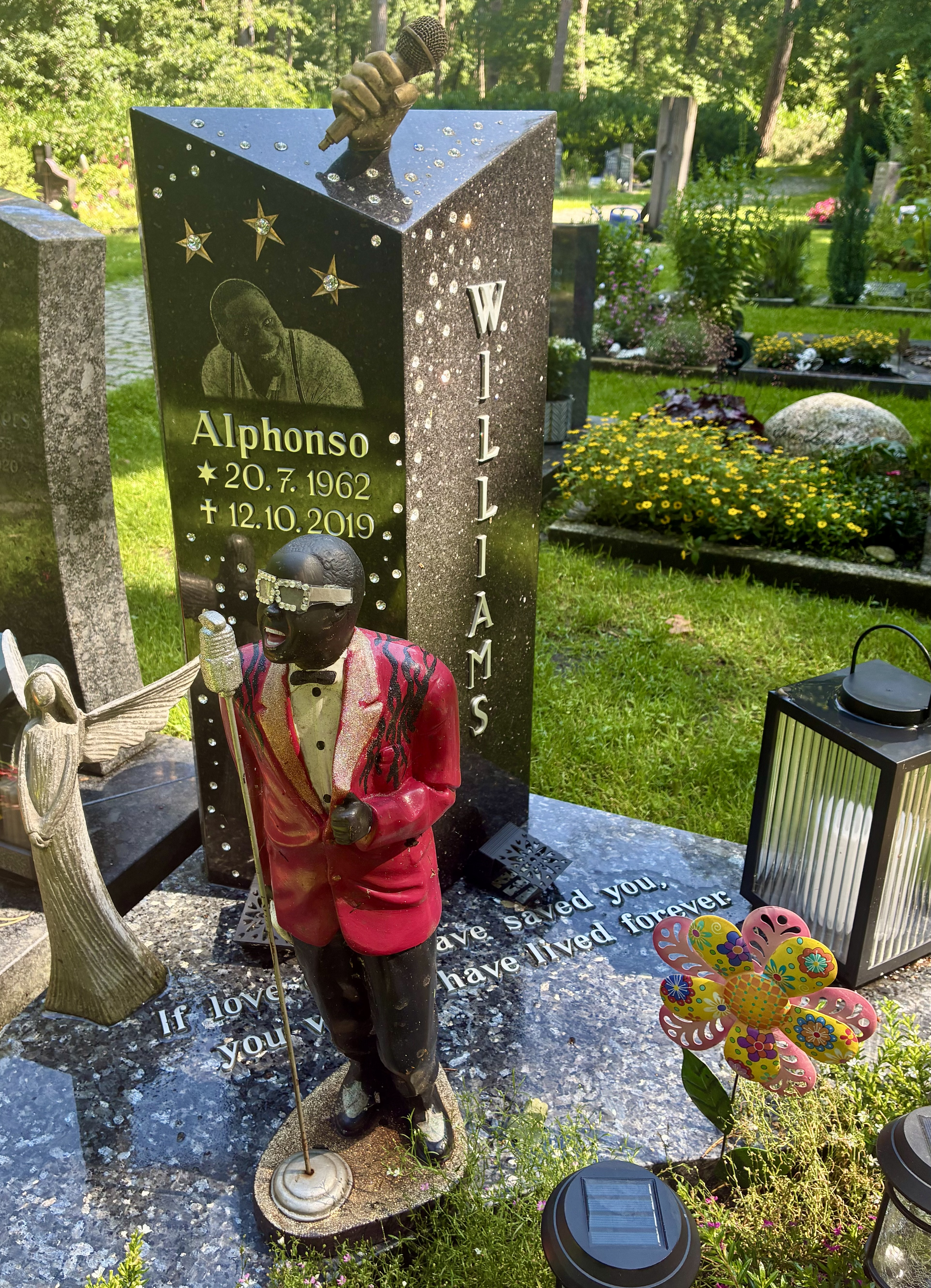
Williams' grave in Ofenerdiek cemetery, Oldenburg.

In January 2019, Williams had to undergo emergency surgery due to kidney failure. He thanked those who gave him the support he needed at the time with the single "Thanks for Sending Love", which was released at the end of May 2019. His return to the stage after the break due to illness and further career steps in Las Vegas, which took place in June 2019, were documented in the Sat.1 program Promis Privat.

Williams died of prostate cancer in Hamburg on 12 October 2019, at the age of 57. In November 2021, the posthumously published autobiography, Born in the USA, was published by NIBE Media.

== Discography ==
=== Albums ===
Title	Album details	Peak chart positions		
Title	Album details	AUT	GER	SWI
Mr. Bling Bling Classics	Released: 26 May 2017; Label: Universal Music; Formats: CD, digital download	14	15	30

=== Singles ===
- 2005: Footsteps in My Heart (as part of "Father & Son")
- 2017: What Becomes of the Broken Hearted
- 2018: Everything Changes
- 2018: Christmas in Our Hearts (as "Mr. Bling Bling")
- 2019: Thanks for Sending Love

== Filmography ==
- 2008: Das Supertalent (RTL) – with his son as "Die Williams"
- 2012: My Name Is (RTL II)
- 2013: Mein Nachmittag: Zuhause im Norden! (NDR)
- 2017: Deutschland sucht den Superstar (RTL)
- 2017: Let's Dance (RTL; musical appearance after DSDS victory)
- 2017: ZDF-Fernsehgarten (ZDF)
- 2018: Promi Big Brother (Sat.1)
- 2019: Promis Privat (Sat.1)
