= Deutschland sucht den Superstar season 14 =

Deutschland sucht den Superstar
- Season 14
- Hosted by: Oliver Geissen
- Judges: Dieter Bohlen; H.P. Baxxter; Michelle; Shirin David
- Winner: Alphonso Williams
- Runner-up: Alexander Jahnke

Release
- Original network: RTL
- Original release: 4 January – 6 May 2017

Season chronology
- ← Previous; Season 13 Next → Season 15

During the live-shows of season 13, it was announced that the castings for season 14 will start in August 2016. The motto was still "No Limits". In late 2016, broadcaster RTL gave closer details to the changes of season 14. The pre-recorded concerts in clubs in Germany were replaced by the "Mottoshows" (theme shows) which were used from season 1 to 10.

In 2016, RTL announced that H.P. Baxxter, Dieter Bohlen and Michelle would return, while Vanessa Mai was replaced by YouTuber Shirin David. Oliver Geissen returned as the host of the live shows. The season marked an all-time high because there was a "final 14" which was the highest amount of Mottoshow contestants ever. Also for the first time a wild card voting was introduced where the public voted Alphonso Williams who was eliminated just before the Mottoshows back in the competition. Alphonso Williams was announced the winner on 6 May followed by Alexander Jahnke, Maria Voskania and Duygu Goenel. With 54 years Williams is the oldest winner to date.

== Auditions and "Recall" ==
There were changes in the rules: New casting candidates were also present during the "Recall" phase, which takes place in Dubai this year. In addition, the groups' Recalls are now treated as those of casting candidates: Each group has to select the Golden CD of a juror before the performance. Directly after the performance, the jurors individually assess the members of the group and agree on their continuation; in the case of a 2: 2 the voice of the jurors, whose Golden CD was selected, counts twice. In the squadrons before the jury met again after all the appearances of a round, decided together which candidates to leave and announced this before all candidates.

== Finalists ==
The Finalist were announced just before the first Mottoshow where only 13 of the last 16 contestants proceeded. Just before the second Mottoshow, it was announced that either Alphonso Williams or Benjamin Timon Donndorf would be returning as a wild card. Alphonso Williams was chosen. Which made it a final 14 in total.

Place	Contestant	Age	Occupation
1	Alphonso Williams	54	Warehouseman
2	Alexander Jahnke	29	Clerk
3	Maria Voskania	29	College student
4	Duygu Goenel	22	College student
5	Noah Schärer	16	Student
6	Chanelle Wyrsch	20	Office woman
7	Sandro Brehorst	18	Student
8	Monique Simon	21	Barkeeper
9	Ivanildo Kembel	40	Barkeeper
10	Ruben Mateo	20	College student
11	Armando Sarowny	26	Event Manager
12	Mihaela Cataj	24	Waitress
13	Angelika Ewa Turo	28	Dentist's assistant
14	Matthias Bonrath	20	Paramedics

== "Mottoshows" ==
The five Mottoshows will be held from 8 April until 6 May 2017. Only thirteen of the last sixteen proceeded on the live shows' start. Before the second Mottoshow it was announced that Alphonso Williams was brought back as a wild card. Making it a Top fourteen in total. The voting results were published right after the finale.

Color key

Contestant wasn't chosen from the judges to join the final 13 and was eliminated
Contestant received the fewest votes and was eliminated
Contestant was in the bottom two, three or four
Contestant received the most votes from the public
Contestant was announced as the season's winner
Contestant was announced as the runner-up

=== Top 16 Elimination ===
Original airdate: 8 April 2017

The final 16 were announced on 1 April 2017 and the final 13 were announced on 6 April.

Contestant	Result
Alexander Jahnke	Advanced
Alphonso Williams	Eliminated
Andrea Renzullo	Eliminated
Angelika Ewa Turo	Advanced
Armando Sarowny	Advanced
Benjamin Timon Donndorf	Eliminated
Chanelle Wyrsch	Advanced
Duygu Goenel	Advanced
Ivanildo Kembel	Advanced
Maria Voskania	Advanced
Matthias Bonrath	Advanced
Mihaela Cataj	Advanced
Monique Simon	Advanced
Noah Schärer	Advanced
Ruben Mateo	Advanced
Sandro Brehorst	Advanced

=== Top 13 – Partyhits ===
Original airdate: 8 April 2017

Order	Contestant	Song	Result	Voting result
1	Duygu Goenel	"When Love Takes Over" – David Guetta ft. Kelly Rowland	Safe	14.90% (3/13)
2	Matthias Bonrath	"Sex on Fire" – Kings of Leon	Eliminated	3.17% (13/13)
3	Mihaela Cataj	"You're the One That I Want" – John Travolta & Olivia Newton-John	Eliminated	3.90% (11/13)
4	Ivanildo Kembel	"Happy" – Pharrell Williams	Safe	5.85% (6/13)
5	Angelika Ewa Turo	"100.000 leuchtende Sterne" – Anna-Maria Zimmermann	Eliminated	3.36% (12/13)
6	Alexander Jahnke	"Ich & Du" – Gestört aber GeiL ft. Sebastian Hämer	Safe	16.42% (2/13)
7	Chanelle Wyrsch	"Ich werde lächeln wenn du gehst" – Andrea Berg	Safe	6.90% (5/13)
8	Ruben Mateo	"María" – Ricky Martin	Bottom four	4.36% (10/13)
9	Maria Voskania	"I'm Outta Love" – Anastacia	Safe	17.21% (1/13)
10	Noah Schärer	"Yeah 3x" – Chris Brown	Safe	9.19% (4/13)
11	Monique Simon	"Rockabye" – Clean Bandit ft. Sean Paul & Anne-Marie	Safe	5.42% (7/13)
12	Sandro Brehorst	"Waiting for Love" – Avicii	Safe	4.47% (9/13)
13	Armando Sarowny	"Don't You Worry Child" – Swedish House Mafia	Safe	4.85% (8/13)

=== Top 11 – My favorite song ===
Original airdate: 15 April 2017

On 13 April it was announced that there would be a wild card. The public votes on the two pre-eliminated contestants Alphonso Williams and Benjamin Timon Donndorf to return. Andrea Renzullo was not an option due to a contract issue. On 14 April Williams was announced as the wild card winner.

- Wild card voting

Contestant	Result	Voting result
Alphonso Williams	Advanced	91.00%
Benjamin Timon Donndorf	Eliminated	9.00%

- Normal voting

Order	Contestant	Song	Result	Voting result
1	Maria Voskania	"Ich bin wie du" – Marianne Rosenberg	Safe	10.62% (3/11)
2	Ivanildo Kembel	"Signed, Sealed, Delivered I'm Yours" – Stevie Wonder	Eliminated	2.98% (9/11)
3	Armando Sarowny	"Let Me Entertain You" – Robbie Williams	Eliminated	2.33% (11/11)
4	Noah Schärer	"I Need a Dollar" – Aloe Blacc	Bottom four	4.97% (8/11)
5	Sandro Brehorst	"Radioactive" – Imagine Dragons	Safe	5.01% (7/11)
6	Chanelle Wyrsch	"Ich sterb für dich" – Vanessa Mai	Safe	5.39% (6/11)
7	Monique Simon	"To Make You Feel My Love" – Adele	Safe	5.92% (5/11)
8	Alphonso Williams	"Car Wash" – Rose Royce	Safe	31.48% (1/11)
9	Ruben Mateo	"So Sick" – Ne-Yo	Eliminated	2.87% (10/11)
10	Duygu Goenel	"Let's Get Loud" – Jennifer Lopez	Safe	9.97% (4/11)
11	Alexander Jahnke	"Gewinner" – Clueso	Safe	18.46% (2/11)

=== Top 8 – Movie songs ===
Original airdate: 22 April 2017

- This week the contestant sang a solo song and a duet.

Order	Contestant	Song	Movie	Result	Voting result
1	Sandro Brehorst	"Footloose" – Kenny Loggins	Footloose	Eliminated	6.11% (7/8)
2	Duygu Goenel	"All By Myself" – Celine Dion	Bridget Jones's Diary	Safe	9.67% (5/8)
3	Alexander Jahnke	"Chöre" – Mark Forster	Welcome to Germany	Safe	12.76% (2/8)
4	Noah Schärer	"Stand by Me" – Ben E. King	Stand By Me	Safe	11.45% (4/8)
5	Monique Simon	"Lady Marmalade" – Christina Aguilera, Lil' Kim, Mya & P!nk	Moulin Rouge!	Eliminated	5.64% (8/8)
6	Chanelle Wyrsch	"Küss mich, halt mich, lieb mich" Ella Endlich	Drei Haselnüsse für Aschenbrödel	Bottom three	7.21% (6/8)
7	Alphonso Williams	"Disco Inferno" – The Trammps	Saturday Night Fever	Safe	35.66% (1/8)
8	Maria Voskania	"Märchen schreibt die Zeit" – Angela Lansbury	Beauty and the Beast	Safe	11.50% (3/8)
9	Alexander Jahnke & Chanelle Wyrsch	"We've Got Tonight" – Ronan Keating & Jeanette Biedermann	Glee	—	
10	Alphonso Williams & Noah Schärer	"I Can't Help Myself" – Four Tops	Forrest Gump	—	
11	Sandro Brehorst & Maria Voskania	"Up Where We Belong" – Joe Cocker & Jennifer Warnes	An Officer and a Gentleman	—	
12	Monique Simon & Duygu Goenel	"When You Believe" – Mariah Carey & Whitney Houston	The Prince of Egypt	—	

=== Top 6 – Semi-final (Anthems of the musical history) ===
Original airdate: 29 April 2017

Order	Contestant	Song	Result	Voting result
1	Chanelle Wyrsch	"Atemlos durch die Nacht" – Helene Fischer	Eliminated	6.21% (6/6)
2	Duygu Goenel	"One Moment in Time" – Whitney Houston	Bottom three	10.07% (4/6)
3	Noah Schärer	"Let It Be" – The Beatles	Eliminated	6.28% (5/6)
4	Alexander Jahnke	"Freiheit" – Marius Müller-Westernhagen	Safe	22.79% (2/6)
5	Alphonso Williams	"I Got You (I Feel Good)" – James Brown	Safe	34.68% (1/6)
6	Maria Voskania	"Who Wants to Live Forever" – Queen	Safe	19.97% (3/6)

=== Top 4 – Finale (Solo song, Favorite performance & Winner's single) ===
Original airdate: 6 May 2017

- The final result was announced after all four contestants performed their three songs.

Order	Contestant	Song	Result	Voting result
1	Alexander Jahnke	"Geboren um zu leben" – Unheilig	Runner-Up	30.91% (2/4)
1	Alexander Jahnke	"Gewinner" – Clueso	Runner-Up	30.91% (2/4)
1	Alexander Jahnke	"Halt alle Uhren an" – Alexander Jahnke	Runner-Up	30.91% (2/4)
2	Maria Voskania	"Irgendwann" – Beatrice Egli	Eliminated in Round 2	18.00% (3/4)
2	Maria Voskania	"Unser Tag" – Helen Fischer	Eliminated in Round 2	18.00% (3/4)
2	Maria Voskania	"Magie" – Maria Voskania	Eliminated in Round 2	18.00% (3/4)
3	Duygu Goenel	"Ghost" – Ella Henderson	Eliminated in Round 1	10.55% (4/4)
3	Duygu Goenel	"Get Here" – Oleta Adams	Eliminated in Round 1	10.55% (4/4)
3	Duygu Goenel	"Passenger" – Duygu Goenel	Eliminated in Round 1	10.55% (4/4)
4	Alphonso Williams	"Stop! In the Name of Love" – The Isley Brothers	Winner	40.54% (1/4)
4	Alphonso Williams	"Disco Inferno" – The Trammps	Winner	40.54% (1/4)
4	Alphonso Williams	"What Becomes of the Brokenhearted" – Jimmy Ruffin	Winner	40.54% (1/4)

== Elimination chart ==
Females	Males	Top 16	Top 14	Winner

Safe	Chosen by the judges for the Top 13, later Top 14	Won the wildcard voting and returned	Most votes	Safe Last	Eliminated

Stage:		Finals						
Week:		4/6	4/8	4/15		4/22	4/29	5/6
Week:		Top 16	Top 13	Wildcard	Normal voting	4/22	4/29	5/6
Place	Contestant	Result						
1	Alphonso Williams	Top 14	—	1st 91.00%	1st 31.48%	1st 35.66%	1st 34.68%	Winner; 40.54%
2	Alexander Jahnke	Top 14	2nd 16.42%	—	2nd 18.46%	2nd 12.76%	2nd 22.79%	Runner-Up; 30.91%
3	Maria Voskania	Top 14	1st 17.21%	—	3rd 10.62%	3rd 11.50%	3rd 19.97%	3rd 18.00%
4	Duygu Goenel	Top 14	3rd 14.90%	—	4th 9.97%	5th 9.67%	4th 10.07%	4th 10.55%
5	Noah Schärer	Top 14	4th 9.19%	—	8th 4.97%	4th 11.45%	5th 6.28%	
6	Chanelle Wyrsch	Top 14	5th 6.90%	—	6th 5.39%	6th 7.21%	6th 6.21%	
7	Sandro Brehorst	Top 14	9th 4.47%	—	7th 5.01%	7th 6.11%		
8	Monique Simon	Top 14	7th 5.42%	—	5th 5.92%	8th 5.64%		
9	Ivanildo Kembel	Top 14	6th 5.85%	—	9th 2.98%			
10	Ruben Mateo	Top 14	10th 4.36%	—	10th 2.87%			
11	Armando Sarowny	Top 14	8th 4.85%	—	11th 2.33%			
12	Mihaela Cataj	Top 14	11th 3.90%					
13	Angelika Ewa Turo	Top 14	12th 3.36%					
14	Matthias Bonrath	Top 14	13th 3.17%					
15	Benjamin Timon Donndorf	Elim		2nd 9.00%				
16	Andrea Renzullo	Elim						
