= Königlich =

Studio album by Marie Wegener
- Released: 1 June 2018
- Recorded: May 2018 in Hamburg
- Language: German
- Label: Electrola
- Producer: Dieter Bohlen

Singles from Königlich
- 1. "Königlich" Released: 5 May 2018

Königlich is the debut album by German singer Marie Wegener, released on 1 June 2018 through Electrola.

== Background ==
Dieter Bohlen had originally expressed that he did not want to act as the producer for the winner of the 15th season of Deutschland sucht den Superstar, the German version of Pop Idol and American Idol, wishing to focus more on his family during the summer. However, during an accidental meeting backstage, Wegener told him that she finds his compositions "amazing" and he felt "guilty" that he would not be writing a song for her, which led to the writing of her finale song "Königlich". Upon Wegener's victory on 5 May 2018, Bohlen made the decision to cancel his family holiday to produce her album.

== Singles ==
"Königlich", Wegener's winning Deutschland sucht den Superstar song, was released as the first single from the album on 5 May 2018, the day of the finale. It peaked at number 3 in Germany, number 10 in Austria, and number 11 in Switzerland. Marcel Adler of the Berliner Woche gave it a negative review, writing that "the song hardly differs from the countless Bohlen winning songs", but acknowledged that Wegener "has potential [...] with her great voice".

== Critical reception ==
In a pre-release review, nordbuzz.de described Königlich as "a mix of groovy pop songs, soulful ballads, and duets with Sarah Lombardi, Pietro Lombardi, and MC Bilal", but felt that it "does not offer any big surprise" and that "[Wegener]'s enormous potential is not fully exhausted on the album". The lyrics were also criticised for "lacking personal notes from Marie herself", being deemed as sounding "more like an experienced schlager queen than a 16-year-old schoolgirl". However, Wegener's "fantastic voice" was praised.

== Track listing ==
Königlich
| No. | Title | Writer(s) | Length |
|---|---|---|---|
| 1. | "Königlich" | Oliver Galle; Dieter Bohlen | 3:35 |
| 2. | "Der mein Herz versteht" | | 3:59 |
| 3. | "Ich will heut Nacht nicht ganz alleine schlafen" | | 3:14 |
| 4. | "Irgendwas bleibt" | | 4:09 |
| 5. | "Liebt er dich?" | | 3:34 |
| 6. | "Einer liebt doch immer mehr" | | 4:20 |
| 7. | "Dieser Augenblick" | | 3:48 |
| 8. | "Woran werd ich mich erinnern?" | | 4:02 |
| 9. | "Wie ein Tattoo in meinem Herzen" | | 3:18 |
| 10. | "Nächtelang" | | 3:19 |
| 11. | "Mein letztes Wort wird Liebe sein" | | 3:45 |
| 12. | "Und wenn du gehst" | | 4:04 |
| 13. | "Liebt er dich?" (featuring Sarah Lombardi) | | 3:33 |
| 14. | "Einer liebt doch immer mehr" (featuring Pietro Lombardi) | | 4:20 |
| 15. | "Du bist der, der mein Herz versteht!!!" (featuring MC Bilal) | | 3:03 |

== Charts ==
| Chart (2018) | Peak position |
|---|---|
| Austrian Albums (Ö3 Austria) | 9 |
| German Albums (Offizielle Top 100) | 7 |
| Swiss Albums (Schweizer Hitparade) | 13 |
