= Marie Wegener =

German singer

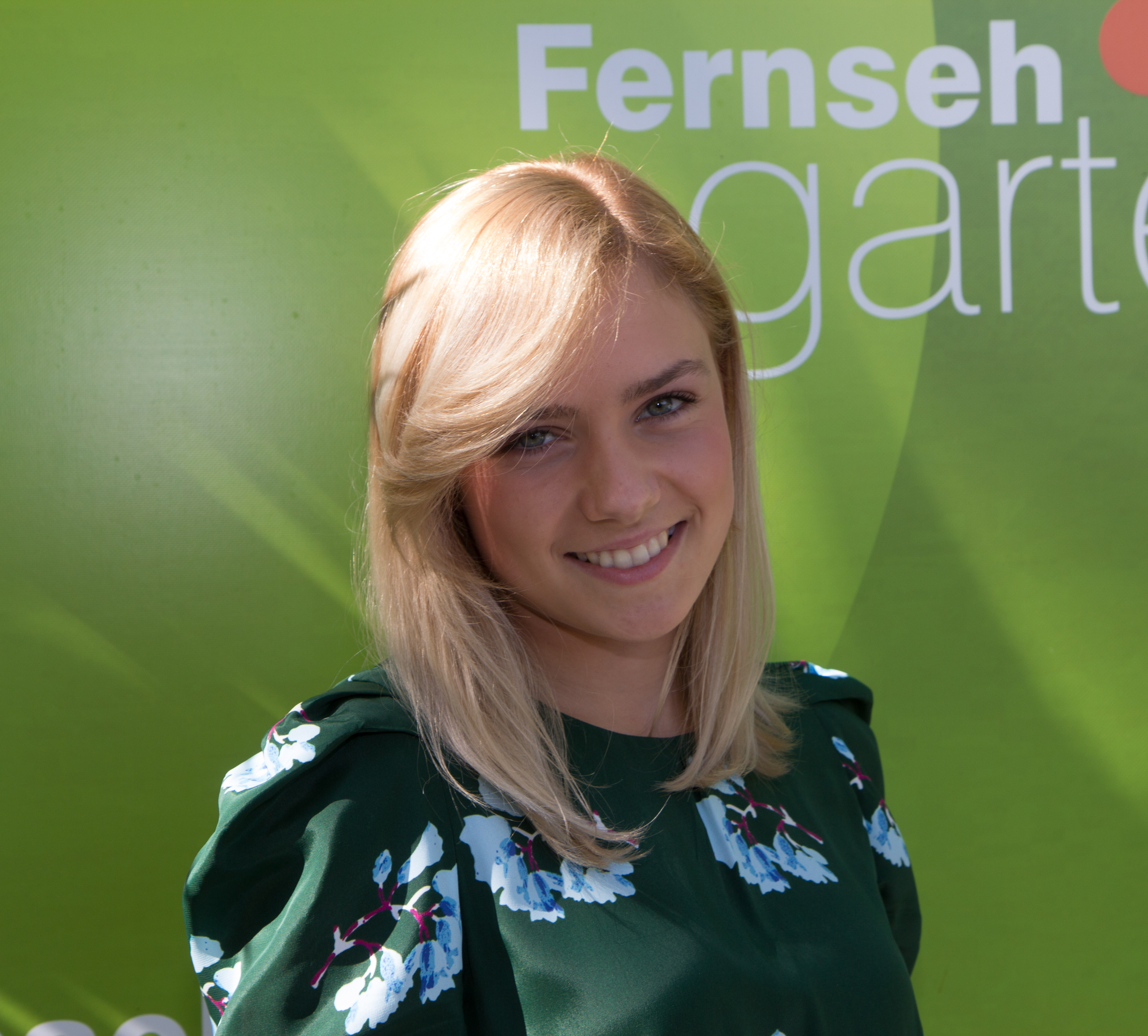
- Wegener in 2018

Background information
- Born: 6 July 2001 (age 23); Duisburg, Germany
- Genres: Pop
- Occupation: Singer
- Years active: 2013–present
- Website: mariewegener.de

Marie Wegener (born 6 July 2001) is a German singer who won the 15th season of Deutschland sucht den Superstar (the German version of Pop Idol and American Idol). She is the youngest winner of the show, the second minor to win, and its fourth female winner. Her winning song "Königlich" was produced by Dieter Bohlen.

Wegener is a former student of the Steinbart-Gymnasium in Duisburg.

In 2013, she took part in the first season of the German version of The Voice Kids, but lost during the Battle Round to Michèle Birner, who went on to win the show.

In 2024, Wegener was one of four artists competing in a special selection for the final of Una voce per San Marino 2024, the Sammarinese national final for the Eurovision Song Contest 2024, with the song "Dare to Dream".

== Songs performed on Deutschland sucht den Superstar ==
Level	Song	Original performer	Percentage of calls
Audition	"I Have Nothing"	Whitney Houston	No televoting
Germany recall (Top 120)	"Liebe ist alles" with Janina El Arguioui, Anna-Katharina Stemler, and Anastasiia Udod	Rosenstolz	No televoting
South Africa recall (Top 24)	"Leiser" with Janina El Arguioui and Mia Gucek	LEA	No televoting
South Africa recall (Top 18)	"Against All Odds" with Giulio Arancio	Mariah Carey featuring Westlife	No televoting
South Africa recall (Top 16)	"Für dich" with Ella Sailer	Yvonne Catterfeld	No televoting
First live show (Top 10)	"Er gehört zu mir"	Marianne Rosenberg	24.27% (first)
Second live show (Top 8)	"My Heart Will Go On"	Céline Dion	39.34% (first)
Third live show (Top 6)	"Naked"	James Arthur	48.44% (first)
Third live show (Top 6)	"I Wanna Dance with Somebody (Who Loves Me)"	Whitney Houston	48.44% (first)
Fourth live show (Top 4)	"Break Free"	Ariana Grande featuring Zedd	64.62% (first)
Fourth live show (Top 4)	"Königlich"	Marie Wegener	64.62% (first)

== Discography ==
=== Albums ===
- 2018 – Königlich
- 2019 – Countdown

=== Singles ===
- 2013 – "Christmas Morning"
- 2017 – "Ich wohne in deinem Herzen"
- 2018 – "Königlich"
