= Deutschland sucht den Superstar season 15 =

Deutschland sucht den Superstar
- Season 15
- Hosted by: Oliver Geissen
- Judges: Dieter Bohlen; Ella Endlich; Mousse T. Carolin Niemczyk
- Winner: Marie Wegener
- Runner-up: Michel Truog

Release
- Original network: RTL
- Original release: 3 January – 5 May 2018

Season chronology
- ← Previous; Season 14 Next → Season 16

For season 15 of Deutschland sucht den Superstar, Dieter Bohlen announced a new jury consisting of Carolin Niemczyk, Ella Endlich and Mousse T. The winner was the 16-year-old Marie Wegener. She is the youngest winner ever and only the fourth woman to win the show and the first to win against a male in the top two. Michel Truog was the runner-up and Michael Rauscher reached the third Place. This season returned to the traditional age limit from 16 to 30. The prize money was reduced to 100,000 euros.

== Finalists ==
The finalist were announced at 7 April and consisted of six male and four female contestants.

Place	Contestant	Age	Occupation	Origin
1	Marie Wegener	16	High School Student	Germany
2	Michel Truog	26	Apprentice	Switzerland
3	Michael Rauscher	20	Tiler	Germany
4	Janina el Arguioui	30	Organizer for children's events	Germany
5	Lukas Otte	20		Germany
6	Mia Gucek	25		Slovenia
7	Giulio Arancio	25		Germany
8	Mario Turtak	25		Germany
9	Isa Martino	30		Germany
10	Emilija Mihailova	29		Switzerland

== "Mottoshows" (theme shows) ==
Color key

Contestant received the fewest votes and was eliminated
Contestant was in the bottom two, three or four
Contestant received the most votes from the public
Contestant was announced as the season's winner
Contestant was announced as the runner-up

=== Top 10 - Discofox ===
Original airdate: 14 April 2018

Order	Contestant	Song	Result	Voting result
1	Michael Rauscher	"Hulapalu" - Andreas Gabalier	Safe	5.66% (7/10)
2	Lukas Otte	"OK" - Robin Schulz feat. James Blunt	Safe	10.90% (3/10)
3	Mia Gucek	"Mein Herz" - Beatrice Egli	Bottom three	4.39% (8/10)
4	Isa Martino	"Sofia" - Álvaro Soler	Eliminated	4.19% (9/10)
5	Janina El Arguioui	"I Will Survive" - Gloria Gaynor	Safe	16.96% (2/10)
6	Michel Truog	"I Want It That Way" - Backstreet Boys	Safe	9.66% (5/10)
7	Marie Wegener	"Er gehört zu mir" - Marianne Rosenberg	Safe	24.27% (1/10)
8	Giulio Arancio	"What Is Love" - Haddaway	Safe	10.81% (4/10)
9	Emilija Mihailova	"Katchi" - Ofenbach vs Nick Waterhouse	Eliminated	4.01% (10/10)
10	Mario Turtak	"Celebration" - Kool & the Gang	Safe	9.15% (6/10)

=== Top 8 - Mein Lieblingssong (My Favorite Song) ===
Original airdate: 21 April 2018

Order	Contestant	Song	Result	Voting result
1	Lukas Otte	"Life is a Rollercoaster" - Ronan Keating	Safe	7.57% (5/8)
2	Mario Turtak	"Isn't She Lovely?" - Stevie Wonder	Eliminated	2.57% (8/8)
3	Giulio Arancio	"Skin" - Rag'n'Bone Man	Eliminated	5.26% (7/8)
4	Janina El Arguioui	"Respect" - Aretha Franklin	Safe	15.02% (2/8)
5	Michel Truog	"Ich will nur" - Philipp Poisel	Safe	14.91% (3/8)
6	Mia Gucek	"Euphoria" - Loreen	Bottom three	5.83% (6/8)
7	Michael Rauscher	"Schieß mich doch zum Mond" - Roger Cicero	Safe	9.50% (4/8)
8	Marie Wegener	"My Heart Will Go On" - Celine Dion	Safe	39.34% (1/8)

=== Top 6 - Semi-Final: Alt und Neu (Old and New) ===
Original airdate: 28 April 2018

Order	Contestant	Song	Result	Voting result
1	Janina El Arguioui	"I'm So Excited" - The Pointer Sisters	Bottom three	9.70% (4/6)
1	Janina El Arguioui	"More Than Friends" - James Hype feat. Kelli-Leigh	Bottom three	9.70% (4/6)
2	Michel Truog	"Amoi seg' ma uns wieder" - Andreas Gabalier	Safe	14.11% (3/6)
2	Michel Truog	"Feuerwerk" - Wincent Weiss	Safe	14.11% (3/6)
3	Lukas Otte	"Ohne dich" - Münchener Freiheit	Eliminated	6.84% (5/6)
3	Lukas Otte	"Castle on the Hill" - Ed Sheeran	Eliminated	6.84% (5/6)
4	Michael Rauscher	"Blue Suede Shoes" - Elvis Presley	Safe	15.22% (2/6)
4	Michael Rauscher	"Way Down We Go" - Kaleo	Safe	15.22% (2/6)
5	Mia Gucek	"Schöner fremder Mann" - Connie Francis	Eliminated	5.69% (6/6)
5	Mia Gucek	"Herzbeben" - Helene Fischer	Eliminated	5.69% (6/6)
6	Marie Wegener	"I Wanna Dance with Somebody" - Whitney Houston	Safe	48.44% (1/6)
6	Marie Wegener	"Naked" - James Arthur	Safe	48.44% (1/6)

=== Top 4 - Finale (Solo song & Winner's single) ===
Original airdate: 5 May 2018

- The final result was announced after all four contestants performed their two songs.

Order	Contestant	Song	Result	Voting result
1	Michael Rauscher	"Blame It on Me" - George Ezra	Eliminated in Round 2	10.91% (3/4)
1	Michael Rauscher	"So wie wir war'n" - Michael Rauscher	Eliminated in Round 2	10.91% (3/4)
2	Janina El Arguioui	"Ja" - Silbermond	Eliminated in Round 1	8.89% (4/4)
2	Janina El Arguioui	"Parachute" - Janina El Arguioui	Eliminated in Round 1	8.89% (4/4)
3	Michel Truog	"Am seidenen Faden" - Tim Bendzko	Runner-up	15.78% (2/4)
3	Michel Truog	"Und sie rennt" - Michel Truog	Runner-up	15.78% (2/4)
4	Marie Wegener	"Break Free" - Ariana Grande ft. Zedd	Winner	64.42% (1/4)
4	Marie Wegener	"Königlich" - Marie Wegener	Winner	64.42% (1/4)

== Elimination chart ==
Females	Males	Top 10	Winner

Safe	Most votes	Safe Last	Eliminated

Stage:		Finals			
Week:		4/14	4/21	4/28	5/5
Place	Contestant	Result			
1	Marie Wegener	1st 24.27%	1st 39.34%	1st 48.44%	Winner; 64.42%
2	Michel Truog	5th 9.66%	3rd 14.91%	3rd 14.11%	Runner-Up; 15.78%
3	Michael Rauscher	7th 5.66%	4th 9.50%	2nd 15.22%	3rd 10.91%
4	Janina el Arguioui	2nd 16.96%	2nd 15.02%	4th 9.70%	4th 8.89%
5	Lukas Otte	3rd 10.90%	5th 7.57%	5th 6.84%	
6	Mia Gucek	8th 4.39%	6th 5.83%	6th 5.69%	
7	Giulio Arancio	4th 10.81%	7th 5.26%		
8	Mario Turtak	6th 9.15%	8th 2.57%		
9	Isa Martino	9th 4.19%			
10	Emilija Mihailova	10th 4.01%			
