= Ella Endlich =

German singer and dancer (born 1984)

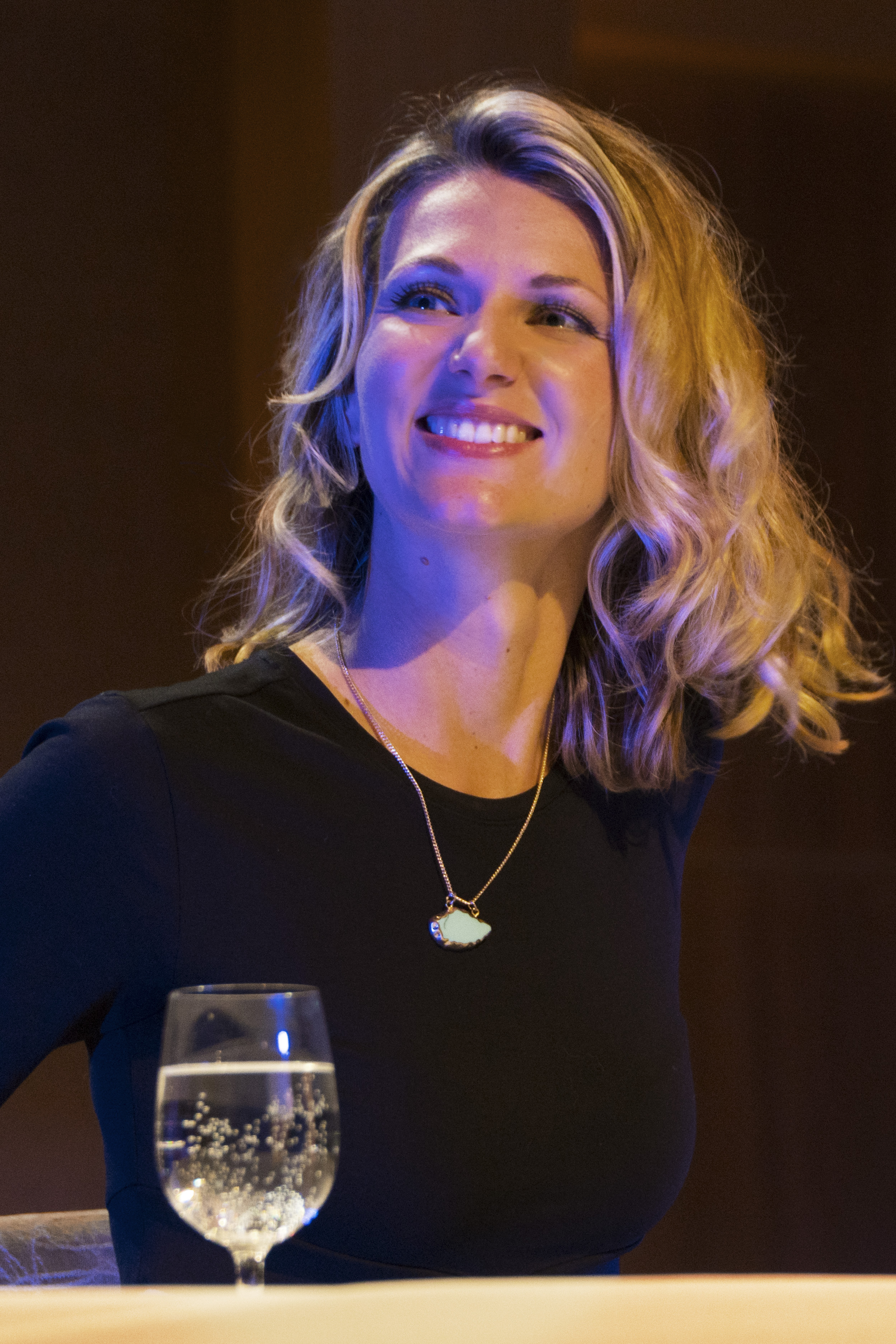
- Endlich signing autographs in July 2017
- Born: Jacqueline Zebisch; 18 June 1984 (age 42); Weimar, Bezirk Erfurt, East Germany
- Other name: Junia
- Occupations: Singer, dancer
- Years active: 1999–present
- Musical career
- Genres: Schlager; pop; musical
- Instrument: Vocals
- Labels: Columbia; Teldec; Universal
- Website: ellaendlich.de

Jacqueline Zebisch (born 18 June 1984), known professionally as Ella Endlich, is a German singer and dancer who also performed as Junia as a teenager. Best known for her song "Küss mich, halt mich, lieb mich", which is based on the title song of the film Tři oříšky pro Popelku, she participated in the national final for the Eurovision Song Contest 2016.

== Career ==
=== 1984–2009: Early life and career beginnings ===
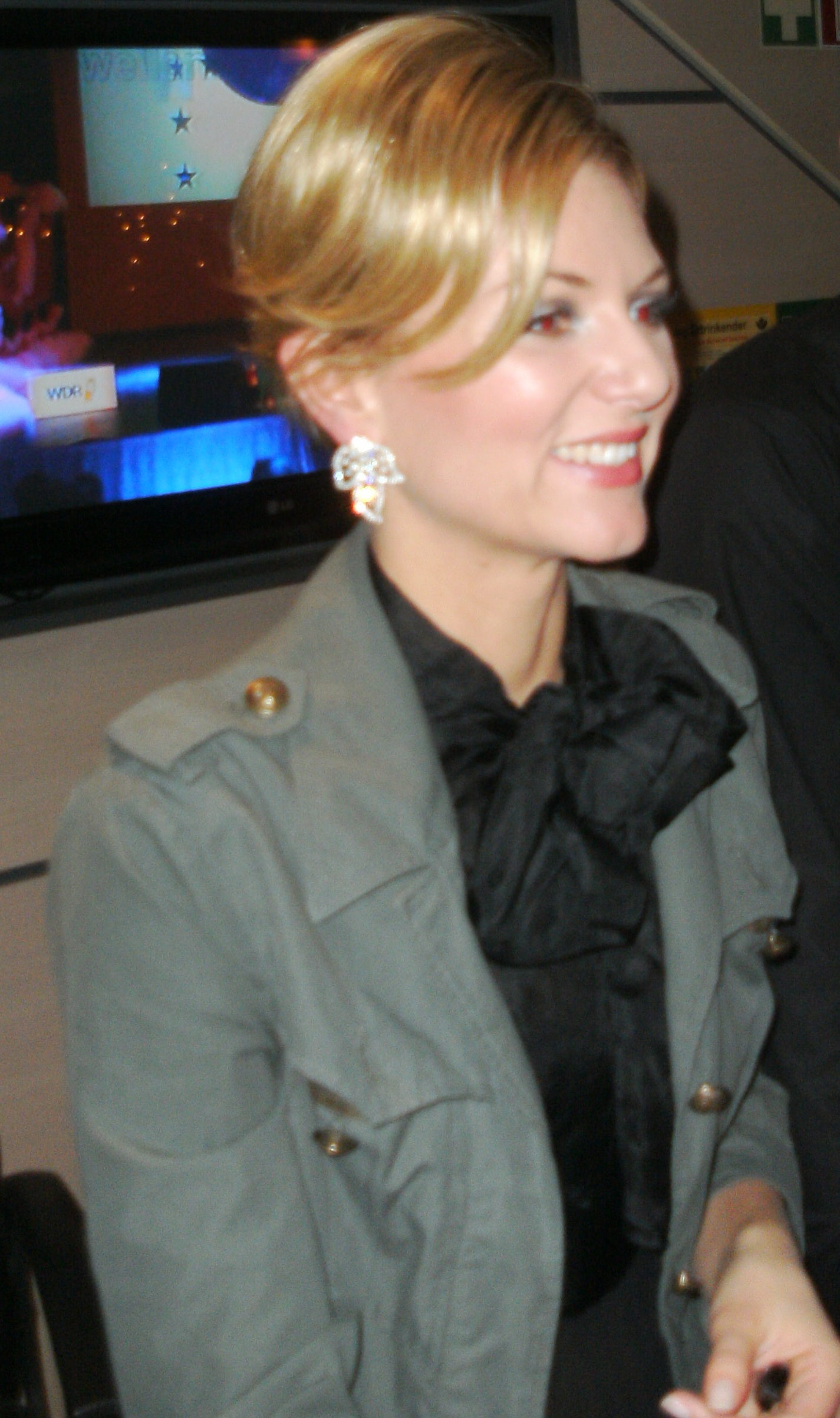
Endlich signing autographs in 2013

Endlich was born in Weimar. She is the daughter of songwriter and record producer Norbert Endlich. In 1989, she moved with her family to West Berlin. At age 10, she sang for the first time in a recording studio at the Hansa Tonstudios and was hired as a background vocalist for the ZDF-Hitparade. During her schooldays, she took dancing and singing lessons and also filmed various videos with her own choreographies for the television channel VIVA in Los Angeles, Miami, and London.

She signed her first contract with Columbia Records on 18 June 1998, her fourteenth birthday, which inspired her stage name at the time, Junia. Her début single "It's Funny" was released in 1999 and peaked at 17 in Germany and 21 in Switzerland. Its follow-up "My Guy" peaked at 54 in Germany and her third single "Who's the Other Woman" peaked at 72 in the country, while her fourth single "Skaterboy", released in 2000, did not chart. All of these songs appeared on her début album Junia, released in 2000.

In 2000, during her teenage career, she took an apprenticeship in the field musical theater at the Musicalstudio Neukölln and finished the Realschule to study at the Bayrischen Theaterakademie August in Munich in October 2001. She specialised in drama and was also educated in dancing, musical, and singing. In 2001 and 2002, she was part of the ensemble of the Bregenzer Festspielproduktionen that performed La Bohème and West Side Story. She performed at the Prinzregentheater München and the Theater Erfurt in City of Angels. In 2005, she completed her studies at the Bayrische Theaterakademie with a diploma. In 2006, she won the singing contest of the HypoVereinsbank as well as the audience prize.

From 2005 to 2009, she performed in numerous musicals, such as Heidi (as Tinette), Sweet Charity (as Betzy), Grease (as Sandy), Prinzessin Lillifee und der Zauber der Rose (as Princess Lillifee), Best of Musicals (as Christine from The Phantom of the Opera), Moulin Rouge! (as Satine), The Little Mermaid (as Ariel), Wicked (as Elphaba), or Les Misérables (as Cosette). She also had a role in the play Der Steppenwolf, which is based on a Hermann Hesse work.

=== 2009–present: Career as Ella Endlich ===
Her first release under the name Ella Endlich was the single "Küss mich, halt mich, lieb mich", which peaked at 12 on the German charts and reached gold status. The song is based on the title song of the film Tři oříšky pro Popelku. In October 2010, she released her first album as Ella Endlich, Da (English: "Here"), which peaked at 53 in Germany and 66 in Austria. Its follow-up Meilenweit (English: "Miles and Miles"), released exactly a year later, peaked at 94 in Germany. In 2012, Endlich released an EP titled Wintercollage. Her album Die süße Wahrheit (English: "The Sweet Truth") was released in June 2014. Later that year, she switched record labels, management, and producers.

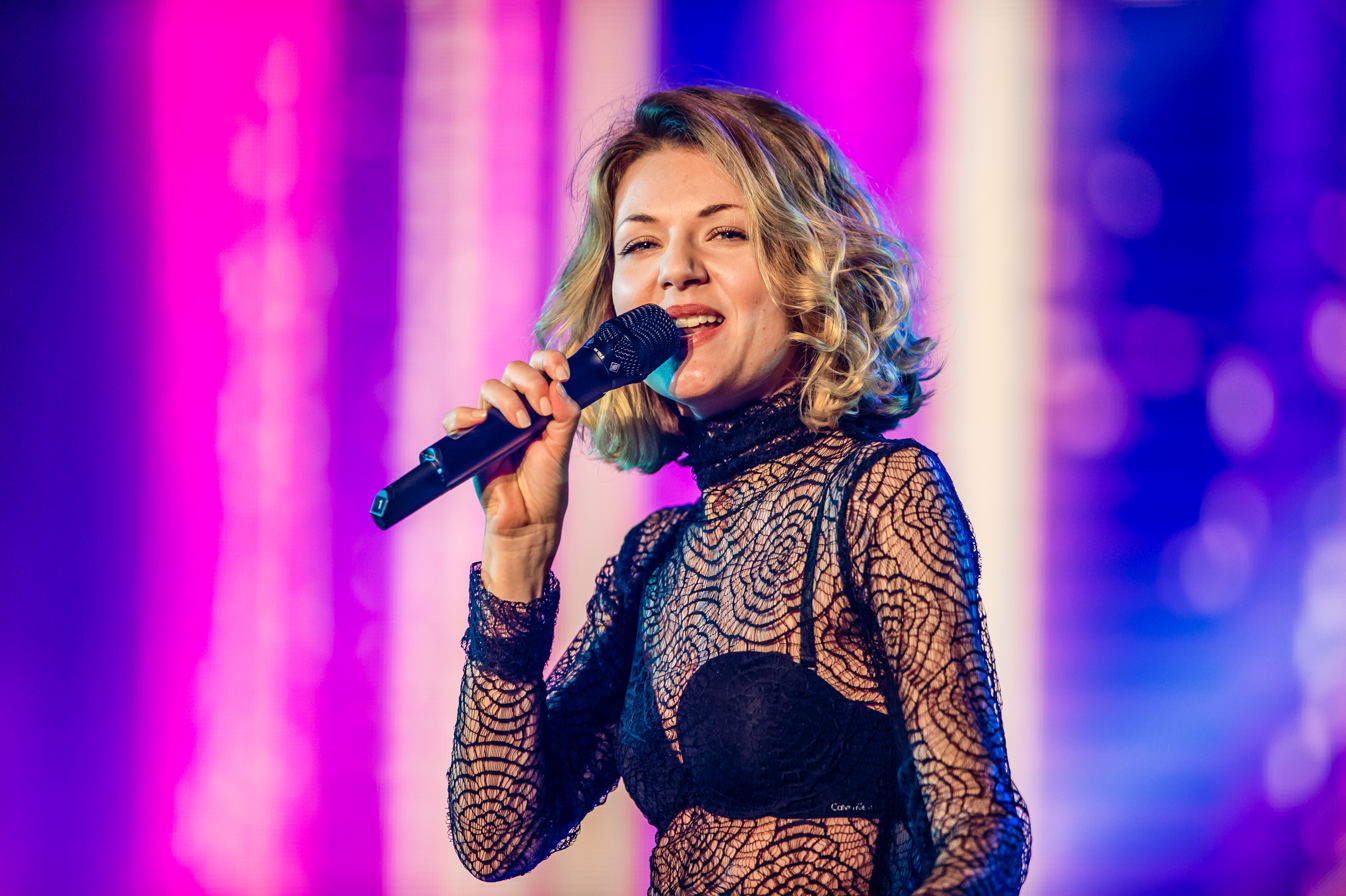
Endlich performing during the national final for the Eurovision Song Contest 2016

In February 2016, Endlich released the album Träume auf Asphalt (English: "Dreams on Asphalt") through Universal and participated in the national final for the Eurovision Song Contest 2016 with the song "Adrenalin". She was a judge on the fifteenth season of Deutschland sucht den Superstar (the German version of Pop Idol and American Idol), which aired from 3 January to 5 May 2018, alongside Dieter Bohlen, Mousse T., and Carolin Niemczyk.

In February 2019, Endlich was announced as a contestant on season 12 of Let's Dance, and her partner was Valentin Lusin. On 29 March, she received the 1st 10 of the season, and received the 1st perfect score of the season 3 weeks later. She earned that same score the next 2 weeks & the last 3 weeks of the season. She broke the record of the most perfect scores of 40, with 11, later matched by season 16 winner Anna Ermakova, and the most 10s of any contestant, with 55 out of 76. On 14 June, she and Lusin finished as the runners-up behind handball player Pascal Hens and partner Ekaterina Leonova.

Week #	Dance / Song	Judges' scores					Result
Week #	Dance / Song	González	Mabuse	Thomalla	Llambi	Total	Result
1	Quickstep / Gekommen um zu bleiben	6	6	6	5	23	No elimination
2	Quickstep / Black Horse and the Cherry Tree	9	8	8	8	33	Safe
3	Contemporary / Running Up That Hill	10	10	9	9	38	Safe
4	Salsa / Tú Sonrisa	9	9	10	10	38	Safe
5	Viennese waltz / Dieses Kribbeln im Bauch	9	9	9	9	36	Safe
6	Samba / Taki Taki	10	10	10	10	40	Safe
7	Tango / Jalousie	10	10	10	10	40	Safe
8	Foxtrot / Lieblingsmensch	10	10	10	10	40	Safe
9	Jive / Surfin' U.S.A.	10	9	10	10	39	Safe
10	Showdance / Don't Give Up; Bollywood / Jatt Ho Giya Sharabee	10; 10	10; 9	9; 10	9; 9	38; 38	Bottom two
11	Charleston / Supercalifragilisticexpialidocious; Rumba / Love Song	10; 10	10; 10	10; 10	10; 10	40; 40	Safe
12; Semi-finals	Cha-cha-cha / Body; Paso doble / Explosive; Instant Salsa / Noche de Copas	10; 10; 10	10; 10; 10	10; 10; 10	10; 10; 10	40; 40; 40	Safe
13; Finals	Quickstep / The Lady Is a Tramp; Samba / Taki Taki; Freestyle / Kill Bill medley	10; 10; 10	10; 10; 10	10; 10; 10	10; 10; 10	40; 40; 40	Runner-up

== Discography ==
=== Studio albums ===
==== As Junia ====
- 2000: Junia

==== As Ella Endlich ====
- 2010: Da
- 2011: Meilenweit
- 2012: Wintercollage (Teldec, 5053105521326)
- 2014: Die süße Wahrheit
- 2016: Träume auf Asphalt
- 2018: Im Vertrauen
- 2021: Endlich Weihnachten (with Norbert Endlich)
