= Jedward discography =

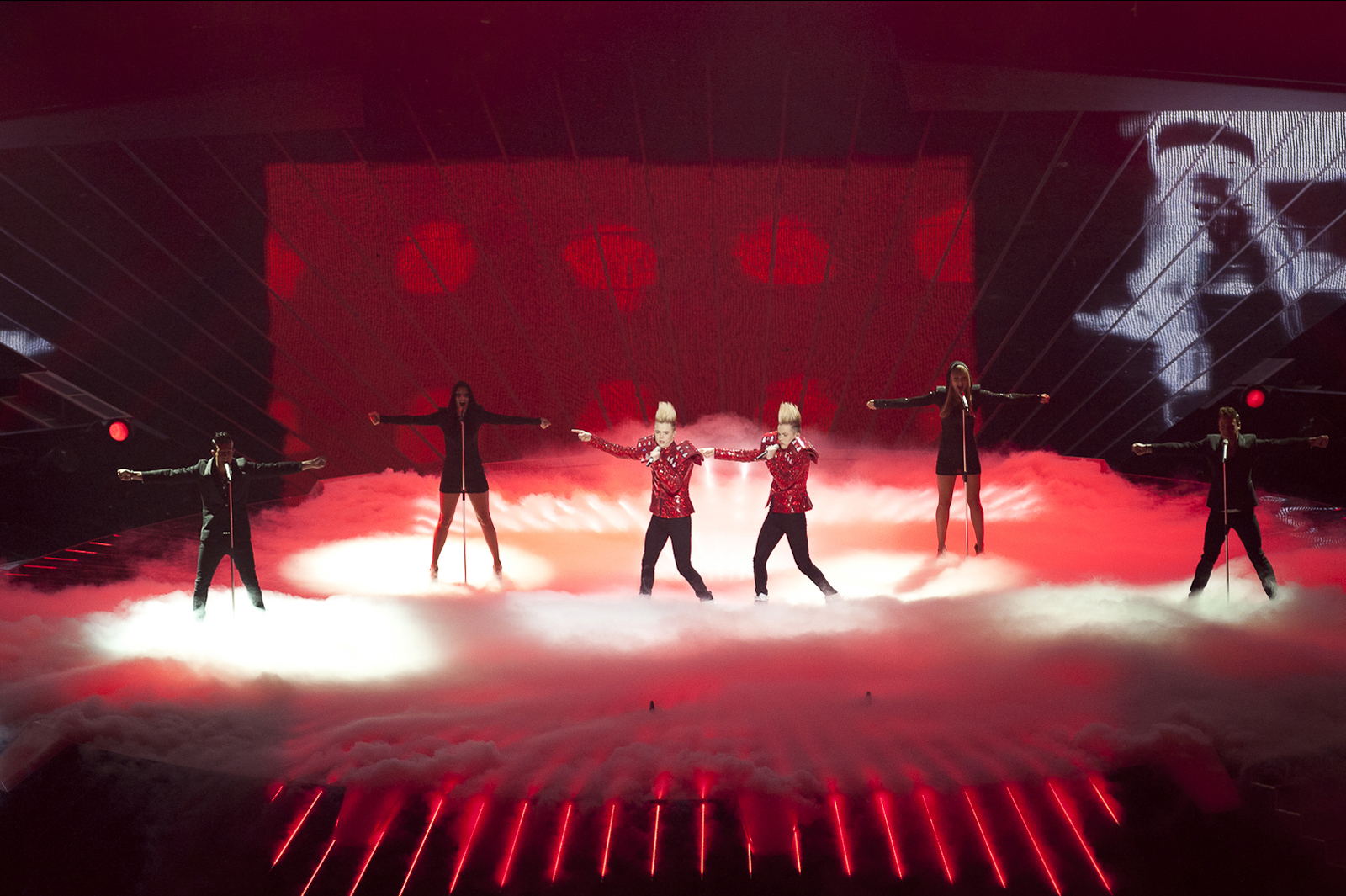
- Jedward performing "Lipstick" at the Eurovision Song Contest 2011
- Studio albums: 4
- Singles: 21
- Music videos: 25
- Featured artist: 1

The Irish pop duo Jedward has released four studio albums, twenty four singles (one as a featured artist) and 28 music videos. Jedward have released four albums, Planet Jedward, Victory, Young Love and Voice of a Rebel, the first two of which went double platinum in Ireland, while the third went gold. They have released 24 singles, including "Under Pressure (Ice Ice Baby)" (a mash-up of "Under Pressure" by Queen and Vanilla Ice's track "Ice Ice Baby"), "Lipstick", the song with which they represented Ireland at Eurovision 2011, and "Waterline", with which they represented Ireland at Eurovision 2012. They have released 28 music videos, 21 of which they directed or co-directed themselves.

== Studio albums ==
List of studio albums, with selected chart positions and certifications
Title	Details	Peak chart positions								Sales
Title	Details	IRL	AUT	EST	FIN	GER	KOR	SWE	UK	Sales
Planet Jedward	Released: 16 July 2010; Label: Universal Music; Formats: Digital download, CD	1	53	—	—	51	22	15	17	IRMA: 2× Platinum
Victory	Released: 5 August 2011; Label: Universal Music; Formats: Digital download, CD	1	—	—	—	—	32	—	34	IRMA: 2× Platinum
Young Love	Released: 22 June 2012; Label: Universal Music; Formats: Digital download, CD	1	45	8	22	50	18	11	63	IRMA: Gold
Voice of a Rebel	Released: 27 June 2019; Label: Universal Music; Formats: Digital download, CD	—	—	—	—	—	—	—	—	
"—" denotes releases that did not chart or were not released in that territory.

== Singles ==
=== As lead artist ===
List of singles, with selected chart positions and certifications
Title	Year	Peak chart positions										Album
Title	Year	IRL	AUT	BEL (FL)	BEL (WA)	GER	KOR	NL	SWE	SWI	UK	Album
"Under Pressure (Ice Ice Baby)" (featuring Vanilla Ice)	2010	1	—	—	—	—	—	—	—	—	2	Planet Jedward
"All the Small Things"	2010	21	—	—	—	—	—	—	—	—	80	Planet Jedward
"Lipstick"	2011	1	3	14	26	12	8	84	11	28	40	Victory
"Bad Behaviour"	2011	1	—	—	—	—	43	—	—	—	—	Victory
"Wow Oh Wow"	2011	—	—	—	—	—	—	—	—	—	—	Victory
"Waterline"	2012	5	65	29	—	62	—	—	32	—	122	Young Love
"Put the Green Cape On"	2012	3	—	—	—	—	—	—	—	—	—	Young Love
"Young Love"	2012	31	—	34	—	—	—	—	—	—	—	Young Love
"Luminous"	2012	59	—	—	—	—	73	—	—	—	—	Young Love
"Free Spirit"	2014	31	—	—	—	—	—	—	—	—	—	Non-album singles
"Ferocious"	2014	15	—	—	—	—	—	—	—	—	—	Non-album singles
"Make Your Own Luck"	2015	—	—	—	—	—	—	—	—	—	—	Non-album singles
"Oh Hell No"	2015	—	—	—	—	—	—	—	—	—	—	Non-album singles
"Leave a Mark"	2015	—	—	—	—	—	—	—	—	—	—	Non-album singles
"Good Vibes"	2016	—	—	—	—	—	—	—	—	—	—	Non-album singles
"The Hope Song"	2016	—	—	—	—	—	—	—	—	—	—	Non-album singles
"Hologram"	2016	—	—	—	—	—	—	—	—	—	—	Non-album singles
"Oxygen"	2017	—	—	—	—	—	—	—	—	—	—	Non-album singles
"Perfect Wonderland"	2018	—	—	—	—	—	—	—	—	—	—	Non-album singles
"Karma"	2018	—	—	—	—	—	—	—	—	—	—	Non-album singles
"Golden Years"	2018	—	—	—	—	—	—	—	—	—	—	Non-album singles
"Soul Crushing"	2019	—	—	—	—	—	—	—	—	—	—	Voice of a Rebel
"Bodies In Action"	2019	—	—	—	—	—	—	—	—	—	—	Voice of a Rebel
"Taste the Heat"	2020	—	—	—	—	—	—	—	—	—	—	Voice of a Rebel
"Extraordinary"	2020	—	—	—	—	—	—	—	—	—	—	Voice of a Rebel
"LOVEmas"	2024	—	—	—	—	—	—	—	—	—	—	
"—" denotes releases that did not chart or were not released in that territory.

=== As featured artist ===
List of singles, with selected chart positions
Title	Year	Peak chart positions		Album
Title	Year	IRL	UK	Album
"You Are Not Alone" (among The X Factor finalists)	2009	1	1	non-album single

== Music videos ==
List of music videos, showing year released and director
Title	Year	Director	Notes
"You Are Not Alone"	2009	—N/a	Among The X Factor finalists
"Under Pressure (Ice Ice Baby)"	2010	Rage	
"All the Small Things"	2010	Andy Hui and Philip Clyde-Smith	
"Lipstick"	2011	Jedward	
"Bad Behaviour"	2011	Rage	
"Wow Oh Wow"	2011	Rage	
"Waterline"	2012	Jedward	
"Miss America"	2012	Jedward	
"Put the Green Cape On"	2012	Caboom	
"Young Love"	2012	Jedward	
"A Girl Like You"	2012	Jedward	
"Luminous"	2012	Alex Grazioli	
"How Did You Know?"	2012	Jedward	
"Happens in the Dark"	2013	Jedward	
"What's Your Number?"	2013	Jedward	
"P.O.V"	2013	Jedward	
"Can't Forget You"	2013	Jedward	
"Free Spirit"	2014	Jedward	
"Ferocious"	2014	Jedward and Gordon Cowie	
"Make Your Own Luck"	2015	Jedward and Gordon Cowie	
"Oh Hell No"	2015	Jedward and Baseer Maroof	
"Leave a Mark"	2015	Jedward and Gordon Cowie	
"Good Vibes"	2016	Jedward	
"The Hope Song"	2016	Jedward	
"Hologram"	2016	Jedward	
"Taste The Heat"	2020	Jedward	
"Extraordinary"	2020	Jedward	
"Teenage Runaway"	2020	Jedward	
