= List of Jedward concert tours =

The following is a comprehensive listing of the series of concert tours undertaken by Irish pop duo Jedward.

== Planet Jedward Tour ==
Planet Jedward Tour
- Tour by Jedward
- Associated album: Planet Jedward
- Start date: 6 April 2010
- End date: 30 November 2010
- Legs: 2
- No. of shows: 64 in Europe

Jedward concert chronology
- The X Factor Live (2010); Planet Jedward Tour (2010); Bad Behaviour Tour (2011)

The Planet Jedward Tour was the duo's first national solo tour. It began in Castlebar, Ireland, on April 6, 2010. The Irish leg of the tour featured Ghetto Fabulous as the opening act. In November 2010, the duo did a second leg of the concert, in venues all across the UK. The British leg of the tour featured Shockolady as the opening act. he Irish Independent rated the tour positively, saying that "Jedwardmania is right up there with Beatlemania."

=== Setlist ===
The following songs were performed during the 25 April 2010 concert at Vicar Street in Dublin, Ireland. It does not represent all concerts during the tour.

1. "I Gotta Feeling"
2. "Rock DJ"
3. "Oops!... I Did It Again"
4. "SOS"
5. "Break My Stride"
6. "We Will Rock You"
7. "Under Pressure (Ice Ice Baby)"
8. "Shake It"
9. "I'm Your Man"
10. "Jump"
11. "Pop Muzik"
12. "I Want Candy"
13. "Jump Around"
14. "All the Small Things"
15. "Bye, Bye, Baby (Baby Goodbye)"

Encore

16. "Ghostbusters"
17. "Under Pressure (Ice Ice Baby)" (Reprise)

=== Tour dates ===
Date	City	Country	Venue
Europe
6 April 2010	Castlebar	Ireland	Royal Theatre & Events Centre
7 April 2010	Galway	Ireland	Leisureland
8 April 2010	Limerick	Ireland	University Concert Hall
9 April 2010	Dublin	Ireland	Mahony Hall
10 April 2010	Derry	Northern Ireland	Millennium Forum
11 April 2010	Belfast	Northern Ireland	Waterfront Hall
12 April 2010	Dungannon	Northern Ireland	Dungannon Leisure Centre
13 April 2010	Omagh	Northern Ireland	Omagh Leisure Centre
14 April 2010	Waterford	Ireland	Forum Waterford
15 April 2010	Killorglin	Ireland	CYMS Killorglin
16 April 2010	Cork	Ireland	Cork City Hall
17 April 2010	Cork	Ireland	Cork City Hall
18 April 2010	Dublin	Ireland	Vicar Street
19 April 2010	Dublin	Ireland	Vicar Street
21 April 2010	Limerick	Ireland	University Concert Hall
22 April 2010	Galway	Ireland	Leisureland
23 April 2010	Castlebar	Ireland	Royal Theatre & Events Centre
24 April 2010	Dublin	Ireland	National Stadium
25 April 2010	Dublin	Ireland	Vicar Street
26 April 2010	Belfast	Northern Ireland	Waterfront Hall
28 April 2010	Dublin	Ireland	Vicar Street
29 April 2010	Dublin	Ireland	The Helix
30 April 2010	Limerick	Ireland	University Concert Hall
1 May 2010	Galway	Ireland	Leisureland
4 August 2010	Dublin	Ireland	Vicar Street
5 August 2010	Dublin	Ireland	Vicar Street
6 August 2010	Drogheda	Ireland	TLT Concert Hall & Theatre
7 August 2010	Drogheda	Ireland	TLT Concert Hall & Theatre
8 August 2010	Dublin	Ireland	Grand Canal Theatre
9 August 2010	Kilkenny	Ireland	The Hub at Cillin Hill
10 August 2010	Limerick	Ireland	University Concert Hall
11 August 2010	Cork	Ireland	Cork City Hall
13 August 2010	Killarney	Ireland	INEC Killarney
14 August 2010	Killarney	Ireland	INEC Killarney
16 August 2010	Galway	Ireland	Leisureland
18 August 2010	Castlebar	Ireland	Royal Theatre & Events Centre
19 August 2010	Castlebar	Ireland	Royal Theatre & Events Centre
20 August 2010	Letterkenny	Ireland	Aura Leisure Centre
21 August 2010	Derry	Northern Ireland	Millennium Forum
22 August 2010	Belfast	Northern Ireland	Waterfront Hall
25 October 2010	Killarney	Ireland	INEC Killarney
26 October 2010	Castlebar	Ireland	Royal Theatre & Events Centre
7 November 2010	Edinburgh	Scotland	Queen's Hall
8 November 2010	Glasgow	Scotland	Pavilion Theatre
9 November 2010	Aberdeen	Scotland	Music Hall
11 November 2010	Newcastle	England	Newcastle City Hall
12 November 2010	Dundee	Scotland	Caird Hall
13 November 2010	Hull	England	Hull City Hall
14 November 2010	Kilmarnock	Scotland	Grand Hall
15 November 2010	York	England	Grand Opera House
16 November 2010	Glasgow	Scotland	Glasgow Royal Concert Hall
17 November 2010	Margate	England	Winter Gardens Main Hall
18 November 2010	Aylesbury	England	Aylesbury Waterside Theatre
20 November 2010	Manchester	England	Bridgewater Hall
21 November 2010	Bradford	England	St George's Hall
22 November 2010	Derby	England	Assembly Rooms Great Hall
23 November 2010	Westcliff-on-Sea	England	Cliffs Pavilion
24 November 2010	Cambridge	England	Cambridge Corn Exchange
25 November 2010	Southampton	England	Southampton Guildhall
26 November 2010	Bristol	England	Colston Hall
27 November 2010	Birmingham	England	Symphony Hall
28 November 2010	Llandudno	Wales	Venue Cymru Theatre Auditorium
29 November 2010	London	England	IndigO_{2}
30 November 2010	Ipswich	England	Regent Theatre

== Bad Behaviour Tour ==
Bad Behaviour Tour
- Tour by Jedward
- Associated album: Planet Jedward
- Start date: 7 April 2011
- End date: 30 July 2011
- Legs: 2
- No. of shows: 23 in Europe

Jedward concert chronology
- Planet Jedward Tour (2010); Bad Behaviour Tour (2011); Carnival Tour (2011)

The Bad Behaviour Tour is the duo's second national tour. The tour began in April 2011, with dates across Ireland. The second leg of the tour, which featured dates across the UK, began in June 2011. The tour was reworked with a circus theme to become the "Carnival Tour" for the second half of 2011 and early 2012.

=== Setlist ===
1. "Bad Behaviour"
2. "Born This Way"
3. "In Too Deep"
4. "All the Small Things"
5. "I Want It That Way"
6. "I Want You Back" / "ABC" / "I'll Be There"
7. "Burnin' Up"
8. "Distortion"
9. "Ghostbusters"
10. "Lipstick"
11. "Baby One More Time"
12. "Hold It Against Me"
13. "Firework"
14. "Bad"
15. "Rock DJ"
16. "We R Who We R"
17. "Dirty Little Secrets"
18. "They Don't Care About Us"
19. "Year 3000"
20. "Under Pressure (Ice Ice Baby)"

=== Tour dates ===
Date	City	Country	Venue
Europe
7 April 2011	Cork	Ireland	Cork Opera House
8 April 2011	Cork	Ireland	Cork Opera House
9 April 2011	Kilkenny	Ireland	The Hub at Cillin Hill
10 April 2011	Drogheda	Ireland	TLT Concert Hall & Theatre
16 April 2011	Waterford	Ireland	Forum Waterford
17 April 2011	Dublin	Ireland	Grand Canal Theatre
18 April 2011	Tallaght	Ireland	Victory Conference Centre
19 April 2011	Limerick	Ireland	University Concert Hall
22 April 2011	Killarney	Ireland	INEC Killarney
23 April 2011	Dublin	Ireland	Olympia Theatre
24 April 2011	Dublin	Ireland	Olympia Theatre
25 April 2011	Derry	Northern Ireland	Millennium Forum
27 April 2011	Castlebar	Ireland	Royal Theatre & Event Centre
25 June 2011	Longford	Ireland	Longford Arms Hotel Ballroom
26 June 2011^{[A]}	Enniscorthy	Ireland	The Promenade
1 July 2011^{[B]}	Haigh	England	Haigh Hall
2 July 2011^{[C]}	Cork	Ireland	The Docklands
3 July 2011^{[C]}	Cork	Ireland	The Docklands
17 July 2011^{[D]}	Arklow	Ireland	Bridgewater Centre Park
22 July 2011^{[F]}	Grange de Lings	England	Lincolnshire Events Centre
23 July 2011^{[E]}	New Ross	Ireland	The Grounds at Southknock
24 July 2011^{[G]}	Hopton-on-Sea	Scotland	Atlas Theatre
30 July 2011^{[H]}	Glasgow	Scotland	Glasgow Green

Festivals and other miscellaneous performances
^{A} County Wexford Strawberry Festival
^{B} Haigh Hall Live
^{C} Live at the Marquee
^{D} Arklow Seabreeze Festival
^{E} JFK Dunbrody Festival
^{F} Midsummer Magic
^{G} Weekend Summer Showbreak
^{H} Glasgow Show

Cancellations and rescheduled shows

21 April 2011	Longford, Ireland	Longford Arms Hotel Ballroom	Rescheduled to 25 June 2011
26 April 2011	Belfast, Northern Ireland	Waterfront Hall	Cancelled

== Carnival Tour ==
Carnival Tour
- Tour by Jedward
- Associated album: Victory
- Start date: 31 July 2011
- End date: 6 December 2011
- Legs: 3
- No. of shows: 33 in Europe

Jedward concert chronology
- Bad Behaviour Tour (2011); Carnival Tour (2011); Victory Tour (2012)

The Carnival Tour is the third concert tour by Irish pop group, Jedward. The tour is essentially a re-working of their Spring 2011 tour. The first leg saw the duo return to Ireland, followed by a European tour after their appearance in Celebrity Big Brother 8. The third leg saw a tour of the UK and Ireland. Although not part of the tour, Jedward also took part in the Christmas panto, Jedward and the Beanstalk at the Olympia Theatre, Dublin between December 21 and January 8, 2012.

=== Setlist ===
1. "Circus" / "Funhouse"
2. "Yeah 3x"
3. "Wow Oh Wow"
4. "All the Small Things"
5. "Everyday Superstar"
6. "Saturday Night"
7. "As Long as You Love Me"
8. "Your Biggest Fan"
9. "Distortion"
10. "Ghostbusters"
11. Medley: "Hot Hot Hot" / "Boom, Boom, Boom, Boom" / "Who Let the Dogs Out?" / "Macarena" / "We Like to Party" / "On the Floor"
12. "Under Pressure (Ice Ice Baby)"
13. "Celebrity"
14. "Techno Girl"
15. "Pop Rocket"
16. "Firework"
17. "My Miss America"
18. "Who's That Chick?"
19. "Hold the World"
20. "Bad Behaviour"
21. "Lipstick"

=== Tour dates ===
Date	City	Country	Venue
Europe
31 July 2011	Dublin	Ireland	Grand Canal Theatre
1 August 2011	Dublin	Ireland	Grand Canal Theatre
3 August 2011	Letterkenny	Ireland	Aura Leisure Centre
4 August 2011	Castlebar	Ireland	Royal Theatre & Event Centre
7 August 2011	Wexford	Ireland	Wexford Opera House
8 August 2011	Limerick	Ireland	University Concert Hall
11 August 2011	Drogheda	Ireland	TLT Concert Hall & Theatre
12 August 2011	Drogheda	Ireland	TLT Concert Hall & Theatre
13 August 2011	Newbridge^{[A]}	Ireland	Curragh Racecourse
13 August 2011	Killarney	Ireland	INEC Killarney
14 August 2011^{[B]}	Ballybunion	Ireland	The Big Top at Castle Greens
15 August 2011	Belfast	Northern Ireland	Waterfront Hall
17 September 2011	Stockholm	Sweden	Fryshuset
18 September 2011	Hamburg	Germany	Große Freiheit 36
20 September 2011	Frankfurt	Germany	Batschkapp
21 September 2011	Munich	Germany	TonHalle München
23 September 2011	Berlin	Germany	FritzClub im Postbahnhof
24 September 2011	Cologne	Germany	Gloria-Theater
25 September 2011	Bochum	Germany	Zeche Bochum
9 October 2011^{[C]}	Waterford	Ireland	Waterford City Centre
16 October 2011^{[D]}	Cavan	Ireland	Mullagh Sports Grounds
22 October 2011	Bundoran	Ireland	Great Northern Hotel Conference Centre
29 October 2011	Newry	Northern Ireland	Páirc Esler
10 November 2011	Castlebar	Ireland	Royal Theatre & Event Centre
11 November 2011	Killarney	Ireland	INEC Killarney
13 November 2011	Mullingar	Ireland	Mullingar Park Hotel Lir Suite
20 November 2011^{[E]}	Tallaght	Ireland	National Basketball Arena
30 November 2011	Newcastle	England	Newcastle City Hall
1 December 2011	Glasgow	Scotland	Glasgow Royal Concert Hall
2 December 2011	Blackpool	England	Opera House Theatre
4 December 2011	Birmingham	England	Symphony Hall
5 December 2011	Cardiff	Wales	St David's Hall
6 December 2011	London	England	Hammersmith Apollo

Festivals and other miscellaneous performances
^{A} iPicnic Family Fun Day
^{B} Atlantic Sessions
^{C} Poptober
^{D} Hooley in the Park
^{E} Tallaght Family Day

Cancellations and rescheduled shows

18 August 2011	Castlebar, Ireland	Royal Theatre & Event Centre	Rescheduled to 4 August 2011

==== Box office score data ====
Venue	City	Tickets sold/available	Gross revenue
Newcastle City Hall	Newcastle	1,232 / 1,450 (85%)	$37,941
Glasgow Royal Concert Hall	Glasgow	1,650 / 1,650 (100%)	$58,075
Opera House Theatre	Blackpool	1,572 / 1,600 (98%)	$55,175
Symphony Hall	Birmingham	1,398 / 1,580 (88%)	$48,015
St David's Hall	Cardiff	1,012 / 1,200 (84%)	$34,034
Hammersmith Apollo	London	1,534 / 1,640 (93%)	$54,205
	TOTAL	8,398 / 9,120 (92%)	$287,445

== Victory Tour ==
Victory Tour
- Tour by Jedward
- Associated album: Victory
- Start date: January 13, 2012
- End date: July 7, 2012
- Legs: 4
- No. of shows: 31 in Europe

Jedward concert chronology
- Carnival Tour (2011); Victory Tour (2012); Young Love Tour (2012–13)

The Victory Tour was themed around the second Jedward album, Victory. It was the duo's second tour of Germany and Sweden, but their first time in Austria, Finland and Estonia. The second leg saw John and Edward do another tour of Ireland, while the third and final leg was the first time audiences saw the duo perform their Eurovision 2012 song "Waterline" live.

=== Setlist ===
The following songs were performed on 15 January 2012 at the Arena Wien in Vienna, Austria. It does not represent all concerts during the tour.

1. "Party Rock Anthem"
2. "Wow Oh Wow"
3. "All the Small Things" / "Teenage Kicks"
4. "Go Getter"
5. "Everyday Superstar"
6. "My Miss America"
7. "When You Look Me in the Eyes"
8. "Techno Girl"
9. "Distortion"
10. "Ghostbusters"
11. "Bad Behaviour"
12. "We Found Love"
13. "Celebrity"
14. "Saturday Night"
15. "I Wanna Go"
16. "Yeah 3x"
17. "Under Pressure (Ice Ice Baby)"
18. "Run the World (Girls)" / "Your Biggest Fan"
19. "Hold the World"
20. "Lipstick"

=== Tour dates ===
Date	City	Country	Venue
Europe
13 January 2012	Armagh	Northern Ireland	Armagh City Hotel Fisher Suite
15 January 2012	Vienna	Austria	Arena Wien
17 January 2012	Osnabrück	Germany	Rosenhof
18 January 2012	Hamburg	Germany	Große Freiheit 36
19 January 2012	Berlin	Germany	Huxleys Neue Welt
21 January 2012	Offenbach am Main	Germany	Capitol
22 January 2012	Düsseldorf	Germany	Stahlwerk
24 January 2012	Gothenburg	Sweden	Brewhouse
25 January 2012	Linköping	Sweden	Arenabolaget Garden
27 January 2012	Örebro	Sweden	Club 700
28 January 2012	Helsinki	Finland	Nosturi
29 January 2012	Tallinn	Estonia	Rock Cafe
11 February 2012	Ennis	Ireland	Conference Rooms at Treacys West County
12 February 2012	Dublin	Ireland	Grand Canal Theatre
13 February 2012	Bundoran	Ireland	Great Northern Hotel Conference Centre
14 February 2012	Castlebar	Ireland	Royal Theatre & Event Centre
15 February 2012	Killarney	Ireland	INEC Killarney
16 February 2012	Mullingar	Ireland	Mullingar Park Hotel Lir Suite
18 February 2012	Kilkenny	Ireland	The Hub at Cillin Hill
10 April 2012	Castlebar	Ireland	Royal Theatre & Event Centre
11 April 2012	Killarney	Ireland	INEC Killarney
29 April 2012	Carlow	Ireland	Dome Family Entertainment Centre
6 May 2012	Arklow	Ireland	Bridgewater Centre Park
3 June 2012^{[A]}	Tramore	Ireland	Tramore Racecourse
10 June 2012^{[B]}	Dundalk	Ireland	Dundalk Market Square
24 June 2012^{[C]}	Cork	Ireland	The Docklands
30 June 2012^{[C]}	Cork	Ireland	The Docklands
1 July 2012^{[D]}	Dungarvan	Ireland	Fraher Field
5 July 2012	Letterkenny	Ireland	Mount Errigal Hotel Glenveagh Suite
7 July 2012^{[E]}	Dortmund	Germany	Westfalenhalle 3A

Festivals and other miscellaneous performances
^{A} Pop Picnic
^{B} Family Fun Day Out
^{C} Live at the Marquee
^{D} The Rhythm Fest
^{E} Dortmunder Music Week

Cancellations and rescheduled shows

7 July 2012	Dortmund, Germany	Signal Iduna Park	Moved to the Westfalenhalle 3A

== Young Love Tour ==
Young Love Tour
- Tour by Jedward
- Associated album: Young Love
- Start date: 2 August 2012
- End date: 1 December 2013
- Legs: 4
- No. of shows: 22 in Europe; 3 in Australia; 25 total

Jedward concert chronology
- Victory Tour (2012); Young Love Tour (2012–13)

On 25 May, a day before Jedward performed at the final of the Eurovision Song Contest 2012 in Baku, Azerbaijan, the duo announced dates for "The Young Love Tour" across Ireland starting in Killarney and ending in Limerick on 24 August.

=== Setlist ===
The following songs were performed during the 27 October 2013 concert at INEC Killarney in Killarney, Ireland. It does not represent all songs performed on tour.

1. "Ghostbusters"
2. "A Girl Like You"
3. "I Love It" / "Pumped Up Kicks"
4. "Luminous"
5. "Give It Up"
6. "Happens in the Dark"
7. "What's Your Number?"
8. "Hall of Fame"
9. "Waterline"
10. "Boyfriend" / "Little Things" / "Hey There Delilah"
11. "Under Pressure (Ice Ice Baby)"
12. "Techno Girl"
13. "Suit & Tie"
14. "My Miss America"
15. "P.O.V."
16. "Chasing Cars"
17. "Fix You"
18. "Lipstick"
19. "All the Small Things"
20. "Cool Heroes"
21. "School's Out"
22. "Feel So Close"
23. "Young Love"

=== Tour dates ===
Date	City	Country	Venue
Europe
2 August 2012^{[A]}	Stockholm	Sweden	Tantolunden
7 August 2012	Killarney	Ireland	INEC Killarney
10 August 2012	Castlebar	Ireland	Royal Theatre & Event Centre
12 August 2012^{[B]}	Newcastle	Ireland	Peamount Healthcare Campus
13 August 2012	Dublin	Ireland	Bord Gáis Energy Theatre
14 August 2012	Wexford	Ireland	Wexford Opera House
15 August 2012	Drogheda	Ireland	TLT Concert Hall & Theatre
16 August 2012	Mullingar	Ireland	Mullingar Park Hotel Lir Suite
17 August 2012^{[C]}	Tralee	Ireland	Denny Street
22 August 2012	Derry	Northern Ireland	Millennium Forum
24 August 2012	Limerick	Ireland	University Concert Hall
26 August 2012^{[D]}	Galway	Ireland	Victoria Place
16 February 2013	Killarney	Ireland	INEC Killarney
26 July 2013	Cork	Ireland	Neptune Stadium
27 July 2013	Limerick	Ireland	UL Sports Arena
24 September 2013	Lowestoft	England	Marina Theatre
25 September 2013	Leicester	England	De Montfort Hall
27 September 2013	Chatham	England	Chatham Central Theatre
28 September 2013	Selsey	England	Bunn Leisure West Sands
29 September 2013	Fareham	England	Ferneham Hall
30 September 2013	Cardiff	Wales	St David's Hall
27 October 2013	Killarney	Ireland	INEC Killarney
Australia
23 November 2013	Perth	Australia	Regal Theatre
30 November 2013	Melbourne	Australia	Palais Theatre
1 December 2013	Sydney	Australia	Enmore Theatre

Festivals and other miscellaneous performances
^{A} Schlagerpopkvällen
^{B} Peamount Pulse Festival
^{C} Rose of Tralee Street Carnival
^{D} Summer Pop

A Night for Christy(Aslan) Benefit Concert in Dublin

Guilfest (UK)

Cancellations and rescheduled shows

25 August 2012	Carlow, Ireland	Dr. Cullen Park	Cancelled. Concert was a part of Summer Beat Bash Family Funday.
15 February 2013	Dortmund, Germany	Goldsaal	Cancelled
