= OMG! Jedward's Dream Factory =

Irish children's reality TV series

- Title card for Series 1–2.
- Also known as: Una's Dream Ticket
- Genre: Children's TV, reality
- Starring: Jedward; Una Healy (series 3)
- Country of origin: Ireland
- Original languages: English, Irish
- No. of series: 3
- No. of episodes: 30

Production
- Running time: 22–26 minutes
- Production company: Tyrone Productions

Original release
- Network: RTÉ Two
- Release: 25 December 2011 – 4 January 2013; 2014

OMG! Jedward's Dream Factory is an Irish children's reality television series starring pop legends Jedward. For its third series, following the departure of Jedward, the series was relaunched as Una's Dream Ticket, now hosted by The Saturdays member Una Healy.

In each episode, the hosts helped to fulfil the wishes of children who had written in to the show, as their "Dream Tickets" (Golden Tickets based on those from Roald Dahl's Charlie and the Chocolate Factory). The wishes involve such activities as meeting players from Manchester United, swimming with a dolphin, interviewing TV presenter Ryan Tubridy, meeting pop group The Saturdays and reading the television news, as well as wishes involving Jedward themselves. Every episode begins with a musical performance from Jedward.

The first series was nominated for best Children's/Youth Programme in the 2012 Irish Film & Television Academy Awards and won best Online PR Campaign in the 2012 Bord Gáis Energy Social Media Awards. The second series was nominated for best Children's/Youth Programme in the 2013 Irish Film & Television Academy Awards

The first series of OMG! Jedward's Dream Factory began broadcast on Christmas Day 2011, playing every day until 3 January. The second series also began broadcast on Christmas Day 2012 and screened until 4 January, with no show on 31 December.

== Episodes ==
=== Series 1 (2011–12) ===
No.	Song	Dreamers	Dreams	Original release date
1	"JEDWARD"	Luka Murphy; Fiona Leamy; Lynsey Reilly	Train with Manchester United; Dance in a flashmob Meet The Saturdays	25 December 2011
Jedward help Luka meet his favourite players from Manchester United and give him the opportunity to be their player escort at their next game, they then help Fiona create a flashmob in the city and help Lynsey get a professional make over in time to meet her favorite band, The Saturdays. Special guests: Rio Ferdinand, Denis Irwin, Sonya Lennon, The Saturdays
2	"We Are Golden"	Ben & Conor Cuffe; Christian Kearney; Aoife Malone; Kayla Walsh	Play with the RTÉ Orchestra; Be a pilot Perform with Royseven; Design an outfit for Jedward	26 December 2011
Jedward help aspiring twin musicians Ben and Conor from County Kilkenny play with the RTÉ Concert Orchestra, help an aspiring pilot named Christian get flying lessons, have their young fan Kayla design an outfit for them and Aoife gets to meet her favorite band Royseven and perform with them. Special guests: Marty Whelan, Royseven
3	"Lipstick"	Conor Leigh; Katie Quirke; Caoimhne Quinn; St Thomas' Hip Hop Crew	Make a giant bar of chocolate Interview Ryan Tubridy; Acting with Saoirse Ronan; Dance with Jedward	27 December 2011
Jedward's biggest Fan, Conor, gets to live his dream making chocolate bars, Katie gets to host The Late Late Show and interview Ryan Tubridy. Caoimhe gets acting lessons with Saoirse Ronan and St Thomas' Hip Hop Crew gets to perform with Jedward. Special guests: Ryan Tubridy, Saoirse Ronan
4	"Bad Behaviour"	Scott Relihan; Una Harty; Edel & Kate; Jenny Wilson	Work with celebrity hairdresser Be a radio DJ; Cooking with Rachel Allen; Play tennis with Conor Niland	28 December 2011
Aspiring hairdresser Scott gets his first haircutting session in a real salon while Una gets to work with Hector in RTÉ 2fm, Edel and Kate get to meet and cook with Rachel Allen and Jenny gets to play tennis with Conor Niland. Special guests: Dylan Bradshaw, Hector Ó hEochagáin, Rachel Allen, Conor Niland
5	"Wow Oh Wow"	Chloe, Kayleigh & Gradie; Chloe Hayes; Sophie Spain; Ross Gibney	Get a Jedward makeover Train with the Irish soccer team Be a journalist Learn BMX tricks from a pro	29 December 2011
3 young fans of Jedward get a Jedward makeover, while Chloe gets to meet Robbie Keane and The Republic of Ireland national football team, while Ross learns some new BMX bike tricks and Sophie gets to live her dream as a journalist. Special guests: Robbie Keane, Joe O'Shea
6	"Teenage Kicks"	Jacqueline McGranahan; Killian Hayden; Ishtara Larkin; 14 viewers	Work as a Dublin Zoo vet Learn magic with Keith Barry; Appear on Ros na Rún; Dance with Jedward	30 December 2011
Killian meets Keith Barry and learns a few tricks from him. Ishtara gets to appear on her favorite TV Show and Jacqueline gets to work in Dublin Zoo and 14 lucky viewers dance with Jedward. Special guests: Keith Barry
7	"We Are Golden"	Cian Burns; Ailbhe; Laura & Niamh; Niamh Mahon	Present the TV news Work at Kiss magazine Be Jedward's tour manager Work with the Garda Mounted Unit	31 December 2011
Aspiring News Reader Cian from Sligo gets to work as a newscaster and meets his favorite news anchor Bryan Dobson. Laura and Niamh become Jedward's tour manager for the day. Niamh gets to work with the Garda Mounted Unit while Ailbhe gets to work with Kiss magazine. Special guests: Bryan Dobson, Niall Breslin, Liam McKenna
8	"Lipstick"	Shonagh Harris; Stephen Byrne; Laura Prior; Isabelle O'Sullivan & friends	Work on Fair City; Spend a day with the army Meet darts champ Phil Taylor; Perform a song for Jedward	1 January 2012
Stephen trains with the army, Shonagh gets to go on the set of Fair City, meet her favorite cast members and even record a small scene, Isabelle and her friends sing their self penned song for Jedward and Laura gets to meet and play darts with world champion Phil Taylor. Special guests: Clelia Murphy, Tony Tormey, Phil Taylor
9	"Bad Behaviour"	Aaron Kerry; Enya O'Dwyer & Eimear O'Sullivan; Doireann de Courcy MacDonnell	Commentate a soccer match Be a zookeeper Ballet lesson from Monica Loughman	2 January 2012
Aaron gets to work as a football commentator with Darragh Maloney. Enya and Eimear pair up to work in the zoo together, while Doireann gets to meet Monica Loughman and perform ballet with her. Special guests: Bill O'Herlihy, Eamon Dunphy, Liam Brady, Darragh Maloney, Monica Loughman
10	"Wow Oh Wow"	Hannah Roberts; Aaron Hurley; Aoife Dardis; Grace Collins	Swim with dolphins Present a TRTÉ show Meet Les Misérables cast Work with chef Derry Clarke	3 January 2012
Hannah gets to swim with Fungi the Dingle Dolphin, aspiring TV presenter Aaron gets the surprise of presenting his favorite show, Elev8 on TRTÉ, Drama Queen Aoife gets to travel to London and see Les Misérables and meet the cast while Grace gets to cook up a meal for Aidan Power with Derry Clarke. Special guests: Diana Bunici, Ivan Minnock, Alexia Khadime, Derry Clarke

=== Series 2 (2012–13) ===
No.	Song	Dreamers	Dreams	Original release date
1	"Waterline"	Chantal O'Callaghan; Issey Fenton; Conor McMahon; Caoimhe Abbott	Run a five-star hotel Go to a red-carpet event Go backstage at Mrs. Brown's Boys; Meet Olly Murs	25 December 2012
Special guests: Francis Brennan, Keith Lemon, David Hasselhoff, Brendan O'Carroll, Olly Murs
2	"A Girl Like You"	Jack Downey; Danielle Byrnes; James Campden; Megan Doyle	Meet the Irish rugby team Work as an RTÉ make-up artist Work on a farm Jedward concert at her house	26 December 2012
Special guests: Donncha O'Callaghan, Miriam O'Callaghan
3	"Luminous"	Philip, Micheál & Seán; Siobhán O'Gara; John O'Connor; Cliodhna Donnelly	Have Jedward design costumes Play the fiddle with Sharon Shannon; Go backstage at The X Factor; Go behind the scenes at Disneyland	27 December 2012
Special guests: Sharon Shannon, Louis Walsh, Union J, District3
4	"All the Small Things"	Ciarán Browne; Sophie Mangan; Zoe Bracken; Julieanne Molloy	Cook with celebrity chef Neven Maguire; Have Jedward play a trick on her teacher Meet Ryan O’Shaughnessy; Spend a day with the DSCPA	28 December 2012
Special guests: Neven Maguire, Ryan O'Shaughnessy
5	"What's Your Number"	Neeama Keogh; David O'Callaghan; Orlagh O'Shaughnessy; Caiomhe O'Leary	Dance with Ashley Banjo and Diversity; Learn from a top jump jockey Go behind the scenes at a music video shoot Make potato crisps	29 December 2012
Special guests: Ashley Banjo and Diversity, Barry Geraghty
6	"Lipstick"	Enzo Crothers; Mark Gleeson; Caragh Rooney; Alice & Amy	Work as a marine biologist Snooker lesson from Ken Doherty; Duet with John Grimes; Work as dog groomers	30 December 2012
Special guests: Ken Doherty, Jamie Heaslip
7	"Miss America"	Ella Pacini; Shane Doherty; Leisha Regan; David Manning	Meet JLS; Drive a train Ride the search and rescue helicopter Make a Jedward comic strip	1 January 2013
Special guests: JLS, Dennis the Menace
8	"Waterline"	Aobhín McGovern; Daniel Philpott; Hannah Heskin; Seán Downey	Meet camogie player Ursula Jacob; Be a firefighter Work on a professional photo shoot Rap with Jedward	2 January 2013
Special guests: Ursula Jacob
9	"A Girl Like You"	Eva Tobin; Dylan Lavelle; Emma O'Callaghan; Sofi-Mei Lally	Meet Little Mix; Be in the Garda Síochána; Be a scientist Dance with Riverdance	3 January 2013
Special guests: Little Mix, Evelyn Cusack
10	"Luminous"	Orla Coffey; Oisín Mahony; Lauren Hendrick; Emily Jade Elliott	Meet Kerry football player Colm Cooper; Perform in a circus Sail a ferry Do special effects make-up with Gavin Rennick SFX Make-up Artist	4 January 2013
Special guests: Colm Cooper

=== Series 3 (2013–14) ===
No.	Song	Dreamers	Dreams	Original release date
1	TBA	TBA	TBA	2013
2	TBA	TBA	TBA	TBA
3	TBA	TBA	TBA	TBA
4	TBA	TBA	TBA	TBA
5	TBA	TBA	TBA	TBA
6	TBA	TBA	TBA	TBA
7	TBA	TBA	TBA	TBA
8	TBA	TBA	TBA	TBA
9	TBA	TBA	TBA	TBA
10	TBA	TBA	TBA	2014
