= Planet Jedward (European version) =

Compilation album by Jedward
- Released: 15 July 2011
- Recorded: 2010: SMP Studios, (Surrey, UK); 2011: Wendyhouse Studios, London, UK
- Genre: Pop, synthpop
- Length: 38:08
- Label: Universal Music International
- Producer: Nigel Wright and Paul Chandler; DEEKAY and Dan Priddy

Jedward chronology
Planet Jedward (2010)	Planet Jedward (2011)	Victory (2011)

The European version of Planet Jedward is a compilation album by Irish pop duo Jedward. The album was released on 15 July 2011 and is a compilation of tracks from the duo's first two albums, Planet Jedward and Victory.

== Background ==
Following the success of Jedward at Eurovision 2011, Universal Music released a compilation album to showcase Jedward's sound in Europe. Despite its name, the European version of Planet Jedward is actually based around tracks from the duo's second album Victory, with seven of the 11 tracks coming from that album, including their Eurovision entry "Lipstick". The remaining four tracks are taken from the original Planet Jedward album.

== Track listing ==
No.	Title	Writer(s)	Length
1.	"Lipstick"	Daniel Priddy, Lars Halvor Jensen, Martin Michael Larsson	3:52
2.	"Bad Behaviour"	Daniel Priddy, Reuben Priddy	2:54
3.	"My Miss America"	Allan Eshuijs, Lars Halvor Jensen, Simon Hermansen	3:21
4.	"Celebrity"	Daniel Priddy	3:39
5.	"Pop Rocket"	Martin Michael Larsson, Alex James, Lars Halvor Jensen	3:20
6.	"Under Pressure (Ice Ice Baby)" (featuring Vanilla Ice)	Freddie Mercury, Brian May, David Bowie, John Deacon, Roger Taylor, Vanilla Ice, Earthquake, Daniel Priddy, Lars Halvor Jensen, Martin Michael Larsson	3:42
7.	"All the Small Things"	Mark Hoppus, Tom DeLonge	2:53
8.	"Fight for Your Right"	Beastie Boys, Rick Rubin, Tom Cushman	3:20
9.	"Jump"	Jermaine Dupri	3:19
10.	"Wow Oh Wow"	Oritsé Williams, Johannes Joergensen, Savan Kotecha, Daniel Klein	3:20
11.	"Distortion"	Daniel Priddy	2:37

== Chart performance ==
Chart (2011)	Peak position
Austrian Albums Chart	53
German Albums Chart	51
Swedish Album Chart	15
South Korean Album Chart	22
