= List of number-one singles of 2011 (Ireland) =

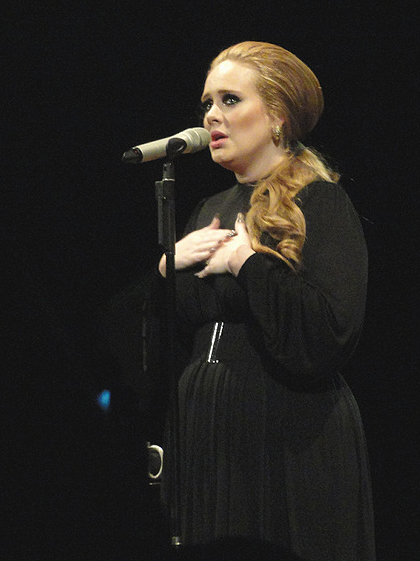
Adele gained her first number one with Someone like You.

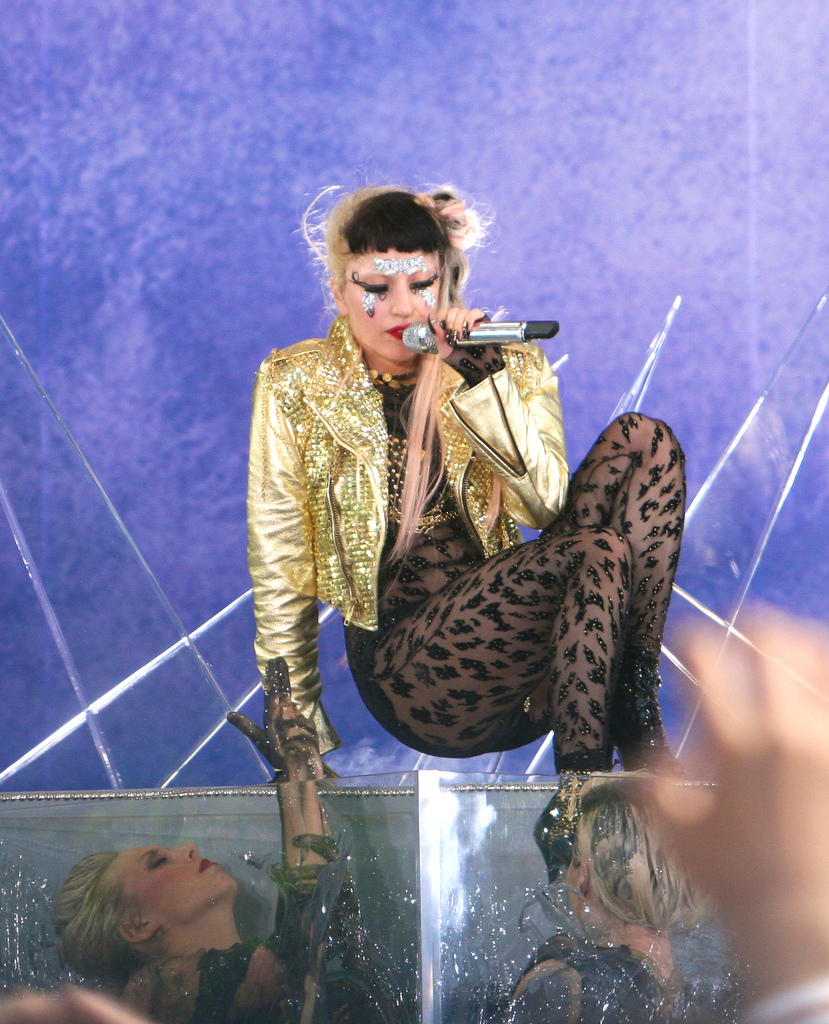
Lady Gaga gained her fifth number one when Born This Way topped the charts

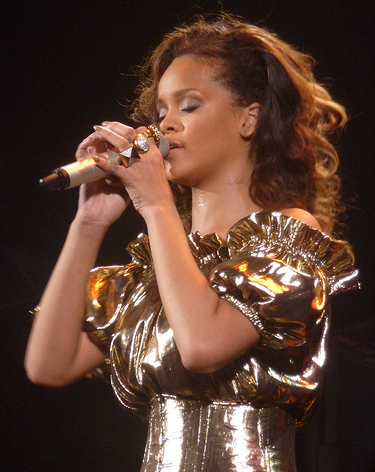
Barbadian singer Rihanna spent seven consecutive weeks at number one with We Found Love.

The Irish Singles Chart is a record chart compiled by Chart-Track on behalf of the Irish Recorded Music Association. The chart week runs from Friday to Thursday.

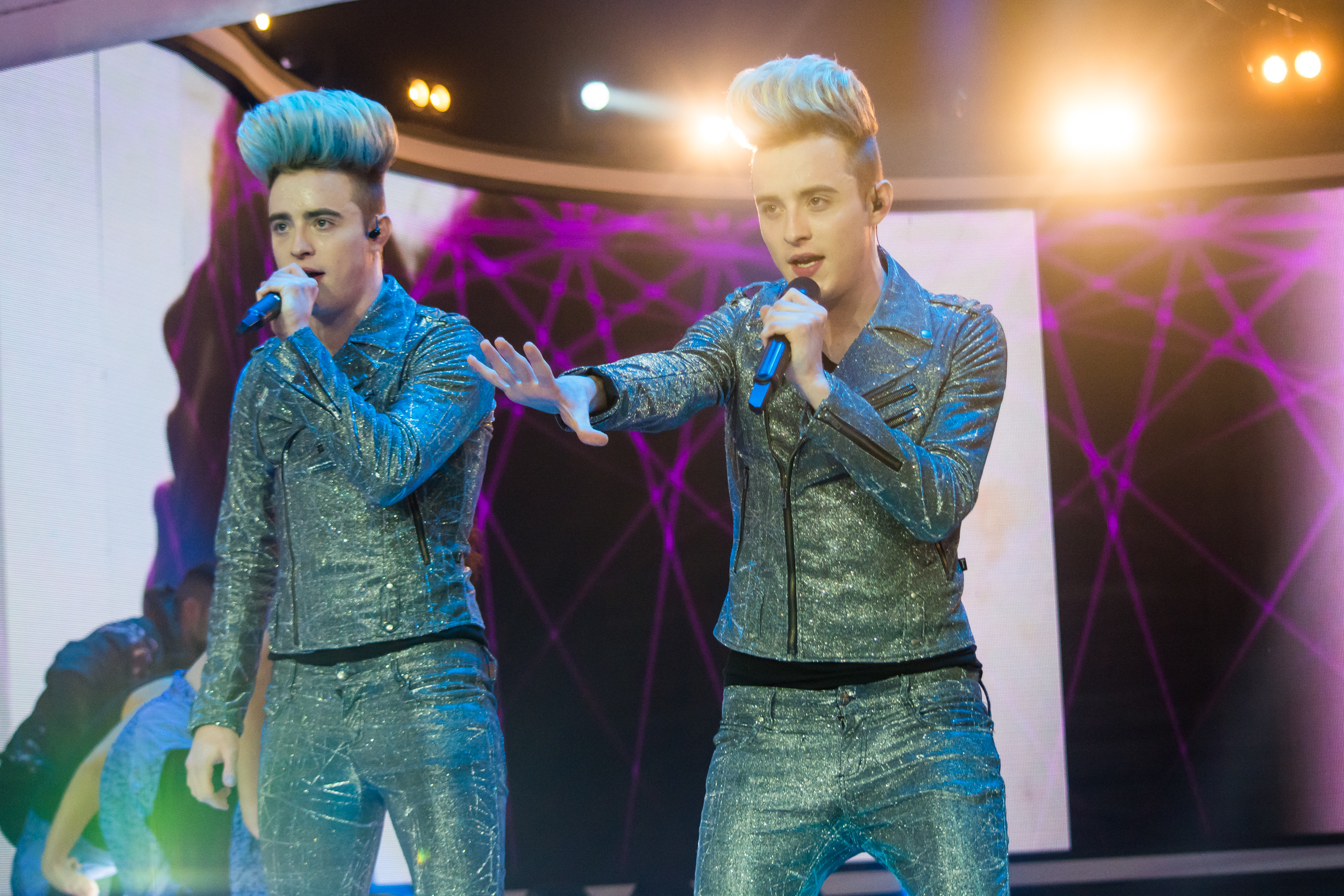
Irish duo Jedward gained two number ones in 2011 with Lipstick and Bad Behaviour.

Issue date	Song	Artist	Reference
6 January	"When We Collide"	Matt Cardle	
13 January	"Grenade"	Bruno Mars	
20 January	"Grenade"	Bruno Mars	
27 January	"Grenade"	Bruno Mars	
3 February	"Grenade"	Bruno Mars	
10 February	"Price Tag"	Jessie J featuring B.o.B	
17 February	"Born This Way"	Lady Gaga	
24 February	"Price Tag"	Jessie J featuring B.o.B	
3 March	"Someone Like You"	Adele	
10 March	"Someone Like You"	Adele	
17 March	"Someone Like You"	Adele	
24 March	"Someone Like You"	Adele	
31 March	"Someone Like You"	Adele	
7 April	"Someone Like You"	Adele	
14 April	"On the Floor"	Jennifer Lopez featuring Pitbull	
21 April	"Party Rock Anthem"	LMFAO	
28 April	"Party Rock Anthem"	LMFAO	
5 May	"Party Rock Anthem"	LMFAO	
12 May	"Party Rock Anthem"	LMFAO	
19 May	"Lipstick"	Jedward	
26 May	"Lipstick"	Jedward	
2 June	"Give Me Everything"	Pitbull featuring Ne-Yo, Afrojack and Nayer	
9 June	"Give Me Everything"	Pitbull featuring Ne-Yo, Afrojack and Nayer	
16 June	"Give Me Everything"	Pitbull featuring Ne-Yo, Afrojack and Nayer	
23 June	"Give Me Everything"	Pitbull featuring Ne-Yo, Afrojack and Nayer	
30 June	"Give Me Everything"	Pitbull featuring Ne-Yo, Afrojack and Nayer	
7 July	"Bad Behaviour"	Jedward	
14 July	"Glad You Came"	The Wanted	
21 July	"Glad You Came"	The Wanted	
28 July	"Glad You Came"	The Wanted	
4 August	"Glad You Came"	The Wanted	
11 August	"Glad You Came"	The Wanted	
18 August	"Moves like Jagger"	Maroon 5 featuring Christina Aguilera	
25 August	"Moves like Jagger"	Maroon 5 featuring Christina Aguilera	
1 September	"Moves like Jagger"	Maroon 5 featuring Christina Aguilera	
8 September	"Moves like Jagger"	Maroon 5 featuring Christina Aguilera	
15 September	"What Makes You Beautiful"	One Direction	
22 September	"What Makes You Beautiful"	One Direction	
29 September	"What Makes You Beautiful"	One Direction	
6 October	"What Makes You Beautiful"	One Direction	
13 October	"We Found Love"	Rihanna featuring Calvin Harris	
20 October	"We Found Love"	Rihanna featuring Calvin Harris	
27 October	"We Found Love"	Rihanna featuring Calvin Harris	
3 November	"We Found Love"	Rihanna featuring Calvin Harris	
10 November	"We Found Love"	Rihanna featuring Calvin Harris	
17 November	"We Found Love"	Rihanna featuring Calvin Harris	
24 November	"We Found Love"	Rihanna featuring Calvin Harris	
1 December	"Wishing on a Star"	The X Factor 2011 Finalists	
8 December	"Wishing on a Star"	The X Factor 2011 Finalists	
15 December	"Cannonball"	Little Mix	
22 December	"Cannonball"	Little Mix	
29 December	"Cannonball"	Little Mix	

== See also ==
- List of number-one albums of 2011 (Ireland)
