= Jedward: Let Loose =

- Starring: Jedward
- Narrated by: Reggie Yates
- Country of origin: United Kingdom
- Original language: English
- No. of series: 1
- No. of episodes: 3

Production
- Running time: 60 minutes (inc. adverts)
- Production company: RDF Television

Original release
- Network: ITV2
- Release: 24 August – 7 September 2010

Jedward: Let Loose is a three-part television series, following the Irish pop duo, Jedward, after their time spent on the sixth series of The X Factor, and the rise in fame they experienced. The fly-on-the-wall series also follows their lives as they produce and release their debut album and launch themselves into the fashion world.

The first series aired from Tuesday 24 August 2010, on ITV2. Jedward's road manager Liam McKenna, confirmed that there were plans to do another series of Let Loose. However it is rumoured that these plans have now been scrapped, and the series cancelled.

== Overview ==
It was confirmed in December 2009 that the duo would have their own ITV2 documentary, produced by RDF Television. The fly-on-the-wall three part series will look at how the boys prepared for the launch of their début album, performing onstage, and dealing with their fame whilst trying to adapt to their new surroundings and independence. The series also takes a look back at their time on The X Factor, whilst documenting the time Jedward spent designing trainers for a sports label, and the production of their music videos.

Upon commission, Jedward said: "We are so excited that we have our own show. People find it hard to define us and hopefully the show will give viewers and our fans an insight into our world during a really exciting point in our lives launching our debut album."

== Episodes ==
No.	Title	Original release date	Viewers
1	"Episode One"	24 August 2010	378,000
The boys launch their Planet Jedward album, attend signings and move out from their childhood home.
2	"Episode Two"	31 August 2010	N/A
Jedward film the video for their second single, All the Small Things, host a party and go shopping on their own for the first time.
3	"Episode Three"	7 September 2010	N/A
Jedward's debut album Planet Jedward is released in Ireland and they must decide to either stay in the apartment or move back home with their parents.

== Reception ==
Ian Wylie, of The Guardian, had a mixed response to the show. Posting on his Twitter account: "Jedward: Let Loose is good. But it's not that good."

David Quantick, of The Daily Mirror was critical of the show, and Jedward themselves. Writing in his column he described Jedward as 'vain', and criticised ITV for cancelling shows like The Bill, whilst producing a 'long, weird and increasingly scary show'. Kevin O'Sullivan, also of The Daily Mirror, was also critical of the show. He compared the show to The Saturdays: 24/7, saying both were 'dull' and he couldn't understand why anybody would tune in to watch either show.
