= Victory Tour =

The Victory Tour may refer to:

Performances:

- Victory Tour (The Jacksons tour)
- Victory Tour (Jedward tour)
- Victory Tour (Modern Talking tour)
- Victory Live (Also known as the Victory Tour) - concert tour by Madeon

Fiction:

- Victory Tour, in The Hunger Games
