= Put the Green Cape On =

Single by Jedward
- Released: 4 May 2012
- Recorded: 2012
- Genre: Bubblegum pop, Teen pop
- Length: 2:55
- Label: Universal Music Ireland
- Songwriter(s): Colm Hayes, Daniel Priddy, Lars Halvor Jensen, Martin Larsson
- Producer(s): Deekay

Jedward singles chronology
"Waterline" (2012)	"Put the Green Cape On" (2012)	"Young Love" (2012)

Music video
- "Put the Green Cape On" on YouTube

"Put the Green Cape On" is a song by Irish pop duo Jedward. The song is based on the duo's hit single "Lipstick" with new lyrics written by Colm Hayes. The song serves as Ireland's unofficial song for UEFA Euro 2012. All proceeds from the sale of the single were donated to Irish charity the ISPCC. The single was released on 4 May 2012.

== Background ==
"Put the Green Cape On" premiered on 3 May 2012, on lyricist Colm Hayes' radio show on RTE2FM. In support of the single, official Jedward green capes were made available for sale in Elverys sports stores across Ireland, priced at €4.99 each.

== Music video ==
The video for the track is 4:19 in length and uses the extended version of the song. The video was created by Irish animation house Caboom and features Jedward as superheroes with animated bodies. The video has guest appearances from many well-known Irish personalities and the lucky winner of a today fm competition max keogh, including Mrs Brown, Louis Walsh, Keith Duffy of Boyzone, Paul McGrath, Bill O'Herlihy, Miriam O'Callaghan, Jay Duffy, Martin King, Larry Gogan, Kathryn Thomas, Rachel Allen, Glenda Gilson, Dustin the Turkey, Bernard Dunne, PJ Gallagher, Zig and Zag, Bosco and Judge. The majority of the video is animated, with the only live-action footage being the guest celebrity appearances.

== Track listing ==
- Digital download / CD single
1. "Put The Green Cape On" (Radio Edit) – 2:55
2. "Put The Green Cape On" (Full Version) – 3:50

== Chart performance ==
Chart (2012)	Peak position
Ireland (IRMA)	3
