= Planet Jedward =

Studio album by Jedward
- Released: 16 July 2010
- Recorded: 2010; SMP Studios, (Surrey, United Kingdom)
- Genre: Pop
- Length: 35:11
- Label: Universal Music International
- Producers: Nigel Wright, Paul Chandler

Jedward chronology
Planet Jedward (2010)	Planet Jedward (European version) (2011)

Singles from Planet Jedward
- 1. "Under Pressure (Ice Ice Baby)" Released: 15 February 2010; 2. "All the Small Things" Released: 16 July 2010

Planet Jedward is the debut studio album by Irish pop duo Jedward. The album was released on 16 July 2010. The album charted at No. 1 in Ireland and No. 17 in the UK. Critical reaction was largely negative.

== Background ==
The album was released via Absolute Records, a minor subsidiary of the Universal Music Group label. However, the twins' debut single, "Under Pressure (Ice Ice Baby)", had been released by Sony Music. The album itself consists entirely of cover versions.

Following the duo's Eurovision success in May 2011, a version of Planet Jedward was released across Europe in July, mainly consisting of previously unheard tracks from the duo's second studio album, Victory. This version of the album also included their Eurovision Song Contest 2011 entry, "Lipstick".

In 2010, the original album was certified double platinum in Ireland, meaning that between 30,000 and 44,999 copies had been sold in the country as of the date of the certification. In the UK, the album had sold 31,251 copies as of August 2011.

== Critical reception ==
Professional ratings
Review scores
Source	Rating
AllMusic	2/5 stars
Daily Express	1/5 stars
Digital Spy	1/5 stars
Financial Times	1/5 stars
Gaffa	2/6 stars
The Guardian	1/5 stars
The Irish Times	2/5 stars
The Scotsman	2/5 stars
Virgin Media	0/5 stars
Yahoo! Music	3/10

The album was received extremely negatively by critics. The Guardian's Caroline Sullivan said "it would be stretching a point to say I'd ever want to hear it again." Virgin Media criticised the "painfully wooden dialogue before the layers of auto-tuned backing vocalists kick in." The Scotsman called it "a 35-minute comedy of errors". Digital Spy said it "contains more crimes against music than the combined discographies of The Cheeky Girls, Phil Collins and Lou Bega." The duo's compatriot newspaper Irish Independent were unsympathetic and declared "Burn it: In the traditional sense of the word, burn the entire thing." OK! magazine said it was "all very karaoke and never going to win any awards, but it's fun. To sum up, Planet Jedward is great for a short visit but we're not sure we'd want to live there!"

== Track listing ==
No.	Title	Writer(s)	Original Artist	Length
1.	"Under Pressure (Ice Ice Baby)" (featuring Vanilla Ice)	Freddie Mercury, Brian May, David Bowie, John Deacon, Roger Taylor, Vanilla Ice, Earthquake, Daniel Priddy, Lars Halvor Jensen, Martin Michael Larsson	David Bowie, Queen and Vanilla Ice	3:42
2.	"All the Small Things"	Mark Hoppus, Tom DeLonge	Blink-182	2:53
3.	"Everybody"	Denniz PoP, Max Martin	Backstreet Boys	2:53
4.	"Ghostbusters"	Ray Parker Jr.	Ray Parker Jr.	2:54
5.	"Fight For Your Right"	Beastie Boys, Rick Rubin, Tom Cushman	Beastie Boys	3:20
6.	"I Want Candy"	Bert Berns, Bob Feldman, Jerry Goldstein, Richard Gottehrer	The Strangeloves	3:15
7.	"Jump"	Jermaine Dupri	Kris Kross	3:19
8.	"I Like to Move It"	Erick Morillo, Mark Quashie	Reel 2 Real	3:43
9.	"Rock DJ"	Robbie Williams, Guy Chambers	Robbie Williams	4:03
10.	"Teenage Kicks"	John O'Neill	The Undertones	2:22
11.	"Pop Muzik"	Robin Scott	M	2:41

iTunes Bonus Track
No.	Title	Writer(s)	Original Artist	Length
12.	"Walk This Way"	Steven Tyler and Joe Perry	Aerosmith	2:49

Japanese Bonus Track
No.	Title	Writer(s)	Original Artist	Length
12.	"Everyday Superstar"	Johannes Jorgensen, Lindy Robbins, Lars Halvor Jensen, Drew Ryan Scott	Original	3:01

== Chart performance ==
Chart (2010)	Peak position
Irish Albums Chart	1
UK Albums Chart	17
