= Free Spirit (Jedward song) =

Single by Jedward
- Released: 17 May 2014
- Recorded: 2014
- Genre: Pop
- Length: 5:28
- Label: Planet Jedward
- Songwriter: John Grimes, Edward Grimes
- Producers: John Grimes, Edward Grimes

Jedward singles chronology
"Luminous" (2012)	"Free Spirit" (2014)	"Ferocious" (2014)

"Free Spirit" is a song by Irish pop duo Jedward. It was released on 17 May 2014 and was announced as the lead single from their upcoming fourth studio album. It is the first single released to have been entirely written and produced by Jedward. The song debuted at number 31 on the Irish singles chart.

== Background ==
On 17 April 2014, Jedward announced details of their fourth studio album, as yet to be released. They revealed that they had written and produced all the songs on the album themselves. They also released the album's lead single, "Free Spirit" on 17 May 2014. The song was inspired by Olympic figure skater Gracie Gold.

== Release history ==
Country	Date	Format	Label
Ireland	17 May 2014	Digital download	Planet Jedward
United Kingdom	17 May 2014	Digital download	Planet Jedward

== Chart performance ==
Chart (2014)	Peak position
Ireland (IRMA)	31
