= Young Love (Jedward song) =

Single by Jedward

from the album Young Love
- Released: 15 June 2012
- Recorded: March 2012
- Genre: Pop
- Length: 3:11
- Label: Universal Music Ireland
- Songwriter(s): Lars Halvor Jensen, Tim McEwan, Jess Cates
- Producer(s): Deekay

Jedward singles chronology
"Put the Green Cape On" (2012)	"Young Love" (2012)	"Luminous" (2012)

Music video
- "Young Love" on YouTube

"Young Love" is a song by Irish pop duo Jedward. It is the second single released from their third album, also titled Young Love. It was released as a digital download on 15 June 2012.

The song is written by Lars Halvor Jensen and Tim McEwan of Danish songwriting and production house Deekay and Los Angeles-based songwriter Jess Cates.

== Background ==
The song was first previewed in April 2012 via the JedwardTV YouTube channel, with a 42-second excerpt of the song. On 11 June, the song was officially confirmed as a single with an international, digital-only release date of 15 June 2012. The cover art was also released on this date, showing a subdued black and white portrait of the twins with flat hair and wearing no shirts. The song had its debut on 12 June, when it was played on Alan Murphy's radio show The Social Network on Irish radio station Galway Bay FM.

== Music video ==
On 13 June, the music video was released, directed by John and Edward themselves. Filmed at the Olympia Theatre in Dublin, the video takes inspiration from U2's Dublin-based "Sometimes You Can't Make It on Your Own" video, and pays homage to the Backstreet Boys' video for "Shape of My Heart".

== Track listing ==
No.	Title	Writer(s)	Length
1.	"Young Love"	Lars Halvor Jensen, Tim McEwan, Jess Cates	3:11

== Chart performance ==
Chart (2012)	Peak position
Belgium (Ultratip Bubbling Under Flanders)	34
Ireland (IRMA)	31

== Release history ==
Country	Release date	Format	Label
Ireland	15 June 2012	Digital download	Universal Music Group
United Kingdom	18 June 2012	Digital download	Universal Music Group
