= Lars Halvor Jensen =

Danish record producer and songwriter (born 1973)

- Born: 23 July 1973 (age 52); Hillerød, Denmark
- Origin: Farum, Denmark
- Genres: Pop, rock, R&B
- Occupation(s): Songwriter, record producer
- Years active: 1996 – present
- Website: deekaymusic.com

Lars Halvor Jensen (born 23 July 1973) is a Danish record producer and songwriter. He has achieved success in many genres of music, particularly pop, rock and R&B and he is the co-founder of DEEKAY Music, a production and publishing company with studios in both Copenhagen, Denmark and Los Angeles, California. He has written for artists such as Jedward, Jordin Sparks, Jason Derulo, NKOTB, Blue, Sugababes, Lemar, JLS, Tinie Tempah, TVXQ, Pixie Lott, Ronan Keating, SHINee, S Club, Girls' Generation, and many more.

== Early life ==
Lars Halvor Jensen was born in Hillerød, Denmark, the son of Irving Halvor Jensen and Ellen Jensen. He grew up in Farum, a small city north of Copenhagen, Denmark. At the age of 18, he was drafted by the military and spent the next two years in the Danish army as a sergeant.

== Introduction to the music business (1995–97) ==
In 1995, he attended a school for music in Denmark called "Den Rytmiske Hoejskole". On the first night he met the person who was later to become his writing and business partner, Martin Michael Larsson. Lars and Martin started writing songs and producing tracks together and making their first complete demos with the help of Norwegian singer, Christina Undhjem. When school ended, Lars, Martin, and Christina kept working on the demos and eventually landed a record deal with MCA/Universal Music, the first act signed to the newly opened label branch in Denmark. Under the band name YouKnowWho, they released their eponymous named first album in 1997, an album which sold in excess of 48,000 copies in Denmark and spawned several top 10 hits.

== From artist to songwriter and producer (1998–2002) ==
Having spent much time on the road promoting the debut album, Lars and Martin now decided to focus on songwriting and production and their first project was Christina Undhjem's solo album, on which they produced and co-wrote half of the songs. The album, Watching You was successful in Denmark as it was certified gold and went on to sell 25,000 copies in 1998. Lars and Martin continued writing songs and in 1999 they landed a major publishing deal with Rondor Music UK, one of the world's largest and most renowned independent publishers at the time.

They started getting releases in the United Kingdom with artists like Samantha Mumba, Mis-teeq in the early 2000s, earning them several UK platinum and gold records.

== International success (2003–present) ==
In 2003, Lars and the DEEKAY team had a session with Blue, a session which produced two international hit singles for the band, "Breathe Easy" and "Bubblin'". After this, Lars went on to co-write and produce hit singles for other major UK artists such as Sugababes, Lemar and JLS.

In the autumn of 2009, Lars moved to Los Angeles, California in order to focus more on the American music scene and work with American writers and artists.

In 2011, he wrote many songs on Jedward's second album Victory after they represented Ireland in Eurovision 2011.

== Entries in the Eurovision Song Contest ==
- "Believe Again" by Niels Brinck, Denmark, (Eurovision Song Contest 2009), 13th
- "Lipstick" by Jedward, Ireland, (Eurovision Song Contest 2011), 8th Place

== Entries in national Eurovision pre-selections ==
- "My Dream" by Christina Undhjem (Norway 2006), eliminated (Semi-Final)
- "Big Bro Thang" by Big Brovaz (United Kingdom 2007), 3rd Place
- "I'm Not Alone" by Kate Hall (Denmark 2013), eliminated (Final)
- "Stay Awake" by Simone (Denmark 2013), 3rd Place
- "I Choose U" by Bryan Rice (Denmark 2014), eliminated (Final)
- "Wanna Be Loved" by Michael Rune feat. Natascha Bessez (Denmark 2014), 2nd Place
