= Luminous (Jedward song) =

Single by Jedward

from the album Young Love
- Released: 12 October 2012
- Recorded: Sweden, March 2012
- Genre: Pop, synthpop, dance
- Length: 3:25
- Label: Universal Music Group
- Songwriter(s): Sebastian Lundberg, Fredrik Häggstam, Johan Gustafson and Marlene Strand
- Producer(s): Trinity Music

Jedward singles chronology
"Young Love" (2012)	"Luminous" (2012)	"Free Spirit" (2014)

Music video
- "Luminous" on YouTube

"Luminous" is a song by Irish pop duo Jedward. It is the third single from their third album, Young Love. It was released as a digital download on 12 October 2012. The song was written by Swedish songwriters Sebastian Lundberg, Fredrik Häggstam, Johan Gustafson and Marlene Strand, and produced by Trinity Music.

== Background ==
On 27 June, Jedward announced that the third single from Young Love would be "Luminous", with a music video made by their record label, Universal Music Ireland. In September, release dates were announced for 12 October in Ireland, 15 October in the UK and 16 October for the rest of the world. "Luminous" received its first UK radio play during presenter Tina Campbell's show on Meridian Radio after Campbell interviewed them for her blog Craveonmusic - now Craveon Entertainment.

== Music video ==
The "Luminous" video was filmed at Ardmore Studios in Ireland on 30 August 2012. Inspired by Star Wars and Avatar, the video has elements of science fiction and fantasy. The "Luminous" video was previewed on Irish youth TV show Elev8 on 9 October, with a full release on 12 October. The video reached #2 on the Irish iTunes video sales chart and #3 on the UK iTunes video sales chart.

== Chart performance ==
Chart (2012)	Peak position
Ireland (IRMA)	59
South Korea (GAON)	73
