= Deekay =

Danish production and songwriting team

Deekay is a Danish production and songwriting team founded by Lars Halvor Jensen, Martin Michael Larsson with other members Tim "Data" McEwan, Daniel "Obi" Klein and Johannes "Josh" Jørgensen. The name Deekay comes from the acronym dk, which means Denmark.

Deekay have written and produced for artists like Jason Derulo, Jordin Sparks, Lil Wayne, Diddy, Sugababes, Orianthi, JLS, Tinie Tempah, Jake Zyrus, Allison Iraheta, Method Man, Fat Joe, Styles P, Lemar, Medina, Mietta, Girls' Generation, Red Velvet, Loona, Exo, TVXQ and others.

== Selected production/songwriting credits ==
Selected releases & recordings written and/or produced fully or in part by DEEKAY

=== New Kids on the Block ===
- "Remix (I Like The)" – Produced & co-written', Top 40 US Billboard Adult Radio
- "10" – Entire album produced, co-written and mixed, except track 10 & 11, #6 US Billboard 200 Album Chart

=== Diddy-Dirty Money feat. Lil Wayne ===
- "Strobe Lights" – Co-produced & co-written

From Diddy/Dirty Money album Last Train to Paris, #7 US Billboard 200 Album Chart

=== Orianthi ===
- "Believe" – co-written

Title-track on Orianthi's 2nd studio album, which has reached certified Gold status in Japan and Australia.

=== JLS ===
- "Kickstart" & "Only Tonight" – Produced & co-written

From their UK No. 1 debut album, which sold in excess of 1.300.000 copies in the UK alone (4 x platinum)

- "Eyes Wide Shut", "Superhero" & "Better For You" – Produced & co-written, Eyes Wide Shut featured Tinie Tempah and reached #2 on the official UK Radio Airplay Chart, with a total of more than 500.000.000 impressions

From their second album, "Outta This World"

=== Sugababes ===
- "Change" – Produced & co-written

Title-track on UK #1 album "Change" – the song was a top 3 UK radio airplay hit.

=== Lemar ===
- "I Don't Mind That" – Produced & written

From multi-platinum album "Time To Grow"

- "It's Not That Easy" – Co-written

1st single from multi-platinum album "The Truth About Love" – No. 2 Official UK Radio Airplay Chart & No. 7 UK Single Sales Chart

=== Jedward ===
- "Lipstick" – Produced & co-written

Hit No. 1 on the iTunes single chart in Germany, Sweden, Austria and Ireland.

- "Victory"– 7 tracks produced & co-written, #1 Ireland
- "Young Love" – Produced & co-written, #1 iTunes Sweden
- "Young Love" – 2 tracks produced & co-written, #1 Ireland

=== Joe McElderry ===
- "Until The Stars Run Out" – Produced & co-written

From his debut album, which entered the UK album chart at #3.

=== Ashley Tisdale ===
- "Switch" & "I'm Back" – Produced & co-written

The first track is included in the credits of the 2009 movie Aliens in the Attic and both of them are included in the Tidale's second studio album, Guilty Pleasure.

=== Girls' Generation ===
- "Hoot" from the album Hoot (009) – Programmed & co-written

Hit no. 1 on all Korean charts 7 minutes after release – 150.000+ pre-orders on "Hoot" album...The song was No. 1 for 5 weeks on the Music Bank K-Chart and won the Triple Crown on the Inkigayo chart in November/December 2010. The Hoot EP achieved 18 x platinum status in Korea and became best song of the year according to Gallup Korea.

- "Hoot" from the album Girls' Generation

The album became the first ever from a foreign girl group to top the Official Japanese Oricon Chart on the release date. The album sold 231,553 copies in the first week, placed first on the Oricon Weekly Album Chart and surpassed the record for first week debut album sales for a foreign artist.

- "Reflection" from the album Girls' Generation II: Girls & Peace - co-written and co-produced
- "Check" from the album Lion Heart - co-written and co-produced
- "Seventeen" from the album Forever 1 - co-written and co-produced

=== TVXQ ===
- "Superstar" – Co-written

Hit no. 1 on the Oricon Daily Chart and No. 1 on the Billboard Hot 100 Japan.

- "Smile" - Co-Produced by Daniel "Obi" Klein

From the Rise as God album

=== Blue ===
- "Breathe Easy", "Bubblin'" & "Back It Up" – Produced & co-written

From the multi-platinum UK No. 1 album Guilty

"Breathe Easy" was the third single from the album and a UK #4. It was an 8-week consecutive No. 1 in Italy and the biggest selling single there in 2004 in front of records like "Yeah", "Toxic" & "Superstar". It was also a hit in the rest of Europe (#7 in Austria & Germany etc.)"

"Bubblin'" was the 4th single from the album and a UK #6. It also became a smash hit all over Europe, top 3 in Italy, top 15 in France, No. 11 Germany etc.

=== Loona ===
- "Eclipse" was the title track for the single Kim Lip by the member Kim Lip herself.
- "Puzzle" was the B track for the single Choerry by the member Choerry herself in collaboration with the previous member JinSoul.

=== S.M. Entertainment Artists ===
Artist	Year	Song	Album	Music	
Artist	Year	Song	Album	Producer	Credited
Exo	2014	Love, Love, Love	Overdose	Daniel "Obi" Klein	co-composition
Exo	2017	Boomerang (부메랑)	The War: The Power of Music	Daniel "Obi" Klein	co-composition, arrangement
Girls' Generation	2010	Hoot (훗)	Hoot	Lars Halvor Jensen, Martin Michael Larsson	co-composition, arrangement, programmed, co-writing
Girls' Generation	2011	Hoot	Girls' Generation	Lars Halvor Jensen, Martin Michael Larsson	co-composition, arrangement, programmed, co-writing
Girls' Generation	2012	Reflection	Girls & Peace	Lars Halvor Jensen, Martin Michael Larsson	co-composition & arrangement
Girls' Generation	2013	Lips	Love & Peace	Daniel "Obi" Klein	co-composition & arrangement
Girls' Generation	2015	Check	Lion Heart	Daniel "Obi" Klein	co-composition & arrangement
Girls' Generation	2022	Seventeen	Forever 1	Daniel "Obi" Klein	co-composition & arrangement
f(x)	2013	Airplane	Pink Tape	Tim McEwan	co-composition & arrangement
Red Velvet	2015	Automatic	Ice Cream Cake	Daniel "Obi" Klein	co-composition & arrangement
Red Velvet	2015	Lady's Room	The Red	Daniel "Obi" Klein	co-composition & arrangement
Red Velvet	2015	Time Slip	The Red	Daniel "Obi" Klein, Johannes "Josh" Jorgensen	co-composition & arrangement
Red Velvet	2015	Cool World	The Red	Daniel "Obi" Klein	co-composition & arrangement
Red Velvet	2016	Cool Hot Sweet Love	The Velvet	Daniel "Obi" Klein	co-composition & arrangement
Red Velvet	2017	Mojito (여름빛)	The Red Summer	Johannes "Josh" Jorgensen, Lars Halvor Jensen	co-composition & arrangement
Red Velvet	2017	Look (봐)	Perfect Velvet	Daniel "Obi" Klein	co-composition & arrangement
Red Velvet	2017	Perfect 10	Perfect Velvet	Daniel "Obi" Klein	co-composition & arrangement
Red Velvet	2024	Bubble	Cosmic	Daniel "Obi" Klein	co-composition & arrangement
SHINee	2010	Hello	Hello [Repackage]	Lars Halvor Jensen, Tim McEwan	co-composition & arrangement
Taemin (SHINee)	2014	ACE	ACE	Daniel "Obi" Klein	co-composition & arrangement
Taemin (SHINee)	2016	Already (벌써 )	Press It	Daniel "Obi" Klein	co-composition & arrangement
Super Junior	2012	Sexy, Free & Single	Sexy, Free & Single	Daniel "Obi" Klein	co-composition & arrangement
Super Junior	2014	Hit Me Up	This is Love	Daniel "Obi" Klein	co-composition & arrangement
TVXQ	2011	Superstar	TONE	Lars Halvor Jensen, Johannes Joergensen	co-composition, co-writing, arrangement
TVXQ	2015	Smile (웨딩드레스)	Rise as God	Daniel "Obi" Klein	co-composition & arrangement
Henry & Sunny (Girls' Generation)	2017	U&I	U&I	Daniel "Obi" Klein	co-composition & arrangement
