= Wow Oh Wow =

Single by Jedward

from the album Victory
- Released: 18 November 2011
- Genre: Pop
- Length: 3:20
- Label: Universal Music Group
- Songwriters: Oritsé Williams, Johannes Joergensen, Savan Kotecha, Daniel Klein
- Producer: Deekay

Jedward singles chronology
"Bad Behaviour" (2011)	"Wow Oh Wow" (2011)	"Waterline" (2012)

Music video
- "Wow Oh Wow" on YouTube

"Wow Oh Wow" is a song by Irish hip pop duo Jedward. It is the third single released from their second album, Victory. It was released as a digital download on 18 November 2011. The song is written by Oritsé Williams of boy band JLS, and songwriters Johannes Joergensen, Savan Kotecha, Daniel Klein of Deekay.

== Background ==
In September 2011, "Wow Oh Wow" was announced as the third single from Victory. Jedward debuted the song on Irish chat show The Late Late Show. The song was released as a digital-only single.

== Music video ==
The music video was directed by Dale "Rage" Resteghini and filmed in Los Angeles, California in October 2011. The video stars actress Tara Reid, who Jedward had previously met as housemates on Celebrity Big Brother. Filmed on Venice Beach and at W Club in Hollywood, John and Edward are smitten by a girl, both on the beach and in a nightclub.

== Track listing ==
- Digital download
1. "Wow Oh Wow" – 3:20
