= Jedward =

Irish musical duo (born 1991)

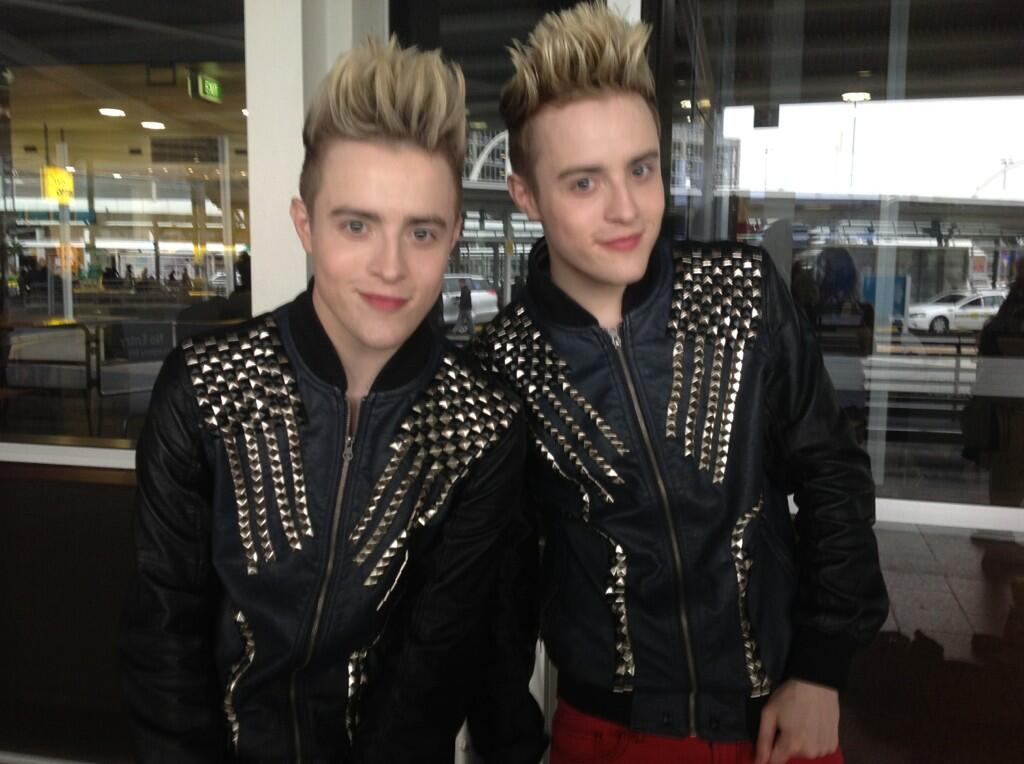
- John and Edward in Australia in 2013

Background information
- Also known as: John & Edward
- Born: 16 October 1991 (age 35); Dublin, Ireland
- Genre: Pop
- Years active: 2009–present
- Labels: Sony; Universal; PlanetJedward
- Members: John Grimes; Edward Grimes
- Website: planetjedward.com

John and Edward Grimes (born 16 October 1991), collectively known as Jedward, are Irish media personalities, entertainers, performers, and singers. They are identical twins who first appeared as John & Edward in the sixth series of The X Factor in 2009, generating a phenomenon of ironic popularity described as "the Jedward paradox". They were the seventh act eliminated and were managed by Louis Walsh, who was their mentor during The X Factor.

Jedward have released four studio albums: Planet Jedward (2010), Victory (2011), Young Love (2012), and Voice of a Rebel (2019). Their first two albums went double platinum in Ireland. They have released several singles, including "Under Pressure (Ice Ice Baby)", "Bad Behaviour", "Lipstick", with which they represented Ireland at the Eurovision Song Contest 2011 in Düsseldorf, Germany, and "Waterline", with which they represented Ireland at the Eurovision Song Contest 2012 in Baku, Azerbaijan.

Jedward's television work includes starring in the documentary series Jedward: Let Loose (2010), presenting the children's series OMG! Jedward's Dream Factory (2011–2013) and Jedward's Big Adventure (2012–2014), and participating in the reality series Celebrity Big Brother 8 (2011), Celebrity Big Brother 19 (2017), in which they finished as runners-up, and Celebrity Coach Trip 4 (2019). Jedwards's combined net worth was estimated at €6m in September 2013, and they have been ranked as the fifth most financially successful former X Factor UK contestants.

== Early and personal life ==
Identical twin brothers John and Edward Grimes were born in Dublin. Their first school was Scoil Bhríde National School in Rathangan. They then attended King's Hospital School for four years before being moved to the Dublin Institute of Education.

The twins competed in school talent shows during their school years and were inspired by Justin Timberlake, Britney Spears and the Backstreet Boys. They were members of the Lucan Harriers Athletic Club and Dundrum South Dublin athletics club and have competed in several Irish athletic tournaments.

They briefly worked as games testers for the Xbox 360 and support football clubs Newcastle United and Celtic.

== Career ==
=== 2009–2012: The X Factor and Planet Jedward ===
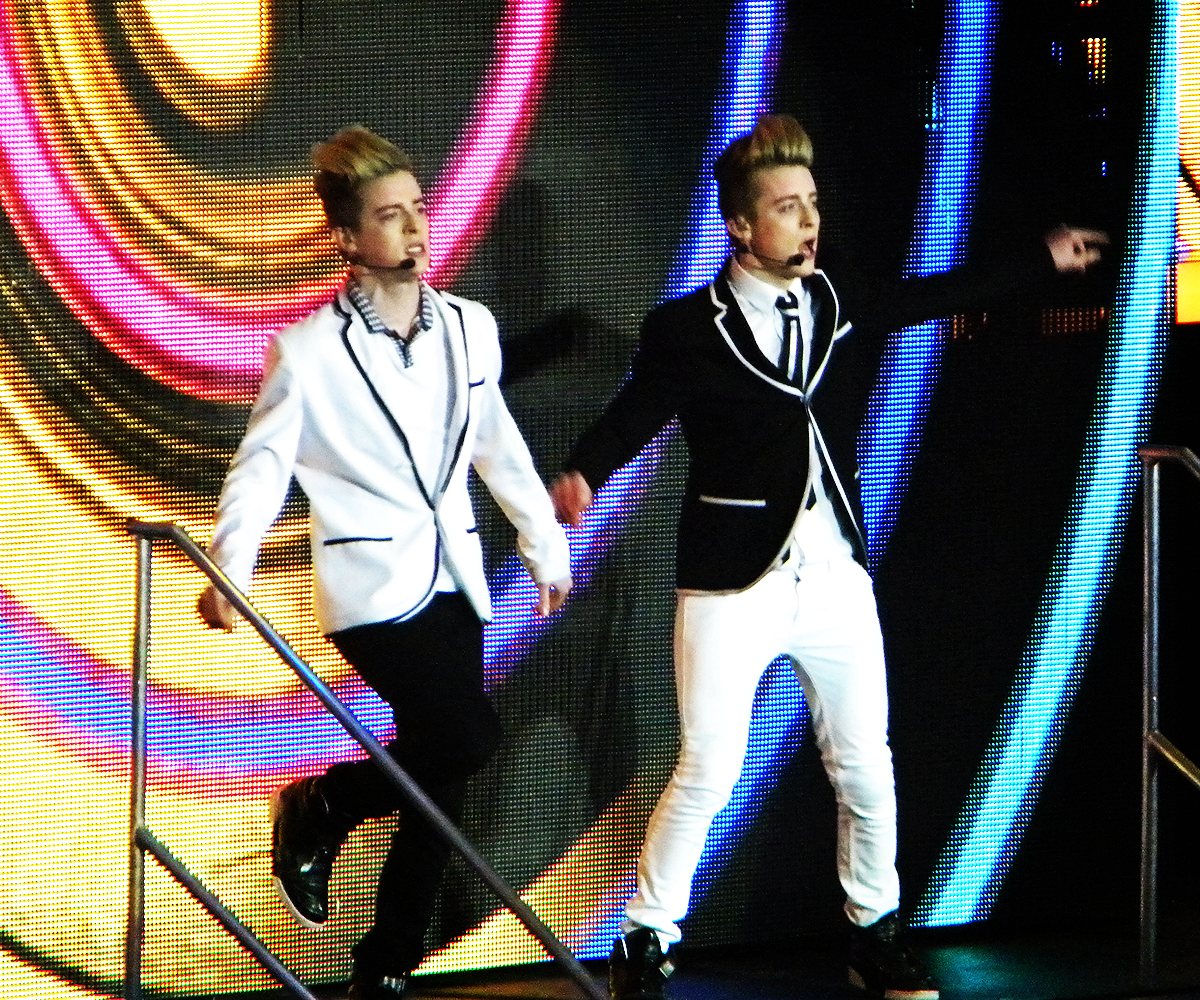
Jedward performing live on the X Factor Tour, in 2010

In 2008, John and Edward formed a duo and the following year they auditioned in Glasgow as a group for the sixth series of The X Factor, under the name John & Edward. Despite being described by judge Simon Cowell as "not very good and incredibly annoying", John & Edward were put through to bootcamp, then made it to judges' houses, where Louis Walsh selected them for the live shows. John & Edward became known for their unpolished but enthusiastic performances, famously including a version of Britney Spears' "Oops!... I Did It Again", during which they reenacted the Titanic monologue. After their departure from The X Factor, Jedward were signed to Modest! Management; however, it was later announced that Louis Walsh had reached "an amicable agreement", which allowed him to take the twins on.

From February until April 2010, they performed on the X Factor Live tour, where they were credited with the boost in demand for tickets, that led to an extension in the tour run. Their debut single "Under Pressure (Ice Ice Baby)" was a mashup of "Under Pressure" and "Ice Ice Baby", with Vanilla Ice contributing guest vocals. In March Jedward's Sony contract ended, but the following day Universal Music Ireland signed them on a three-album contract. In April 2010, Jedward began their first solo tour, a 27-date tour of Ireland called the Planet Jedward Tour. Due to popular demand, it was extended with a second 43-date leg in the UK and Ireland. The Irish Independent rated the tour positively, saying that "Jedwardmania is right up there with Beatlemania." Jedward's second single, a cover of the Blink-182 song "All the Small Things", was released in July 2010 and peaked at number 21 on the Irish charts and number 6 on the UK Indie Chart. The same week, Jedward released their debut album Planet Jedward, consisting of cover versions. It which went straight to number one on the Irish Albums Chart and number 17 on the UK Albums Chart. In August 2010, Jedward appeared in their own ITV2 documentary, entitled Jedward: Let Loose, a three-part series in which they moved out of their home for ten days.

=== 2011–2012: Victory ===
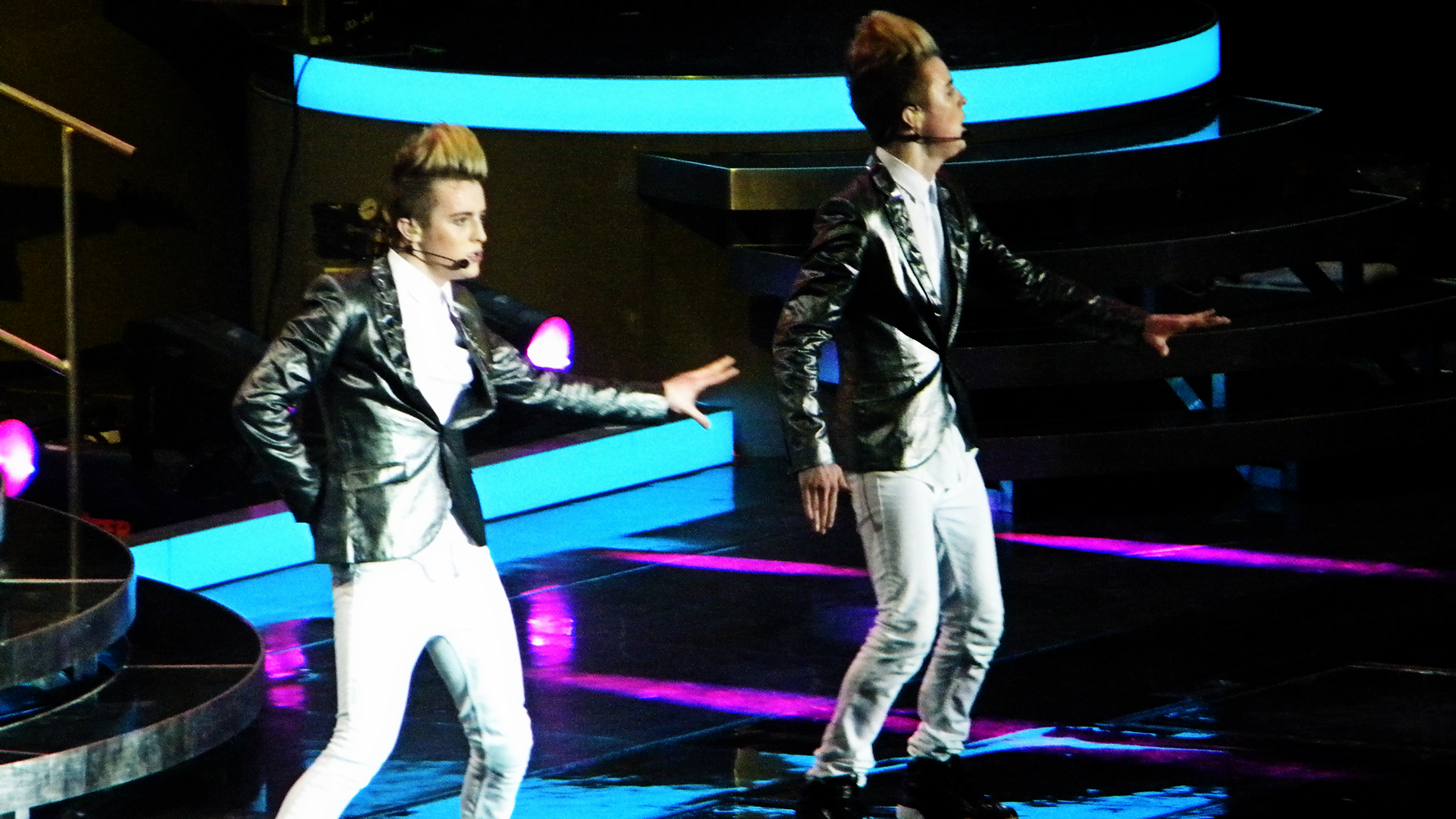
Jedward performing live on the X Factor Tour, in 2010

On 12 February 2011, Jedward released their third single and Eurovision Song Contest entry "Lipstick", which peaked at number one in Ireland. Jedward successfully qualified from the second Eurovision Song Contest semi-final, eventually finishing in eighth place. After the Eurovision Song Contest, "Lipstick" was released digitally across Europe, where it charted in many countries such as Belgium, Sweden, Germany and most notably Austria where it peaked at number three. The song also peaked at number 8 in the South Korea's international artists' chart. "Lipstick" had featured in a Hyundai advertising campaign in South East Asia. Shortly after the Eurovision Song Contest, on 23 May, Jedward performed in front of an audience of 60,000 people at College Green in Dublin City ahead of a speech by visiting U.S. President Barack Obama. In April 2011, Jedward began their second tour, the Bad Behaviour Tour, with a series of dates across Ireland.

Jedward's next single "Bad Behaviour" was released in July and reached number one in the Irish charts. This was followed two weeks later by their second album Victory, consisting entirely of original tracks. A new version of Planet Jedward was released by the German branch of Universal Music in July, featuring a mix of tracks from Planet Jedward and new songs from Victory. On 31 July, the twins began the first leg of their third tour, The Carnival Tour, with 12 shows across Ireland and Northern Ireland. In September Jedward played their first European tour, with dates in Sweden and Germany, followed by a UK tour. Three days after the first leg finished, Jedward entered the Celebrity Big Brother 8 house. They made it to the final, eventually finishing in third place. The third single from Victory, "Wow Oh Wow" was released in August 2011, with a music video featuring their Celebrity Big Brother housemate Tara Reid. In December, Jedward starred in the pantomime Jedward and the Beanstalk, a musical comedy version of the fairytale Jack and the Beanstalk.

=== 2012–2013: Young Love ===
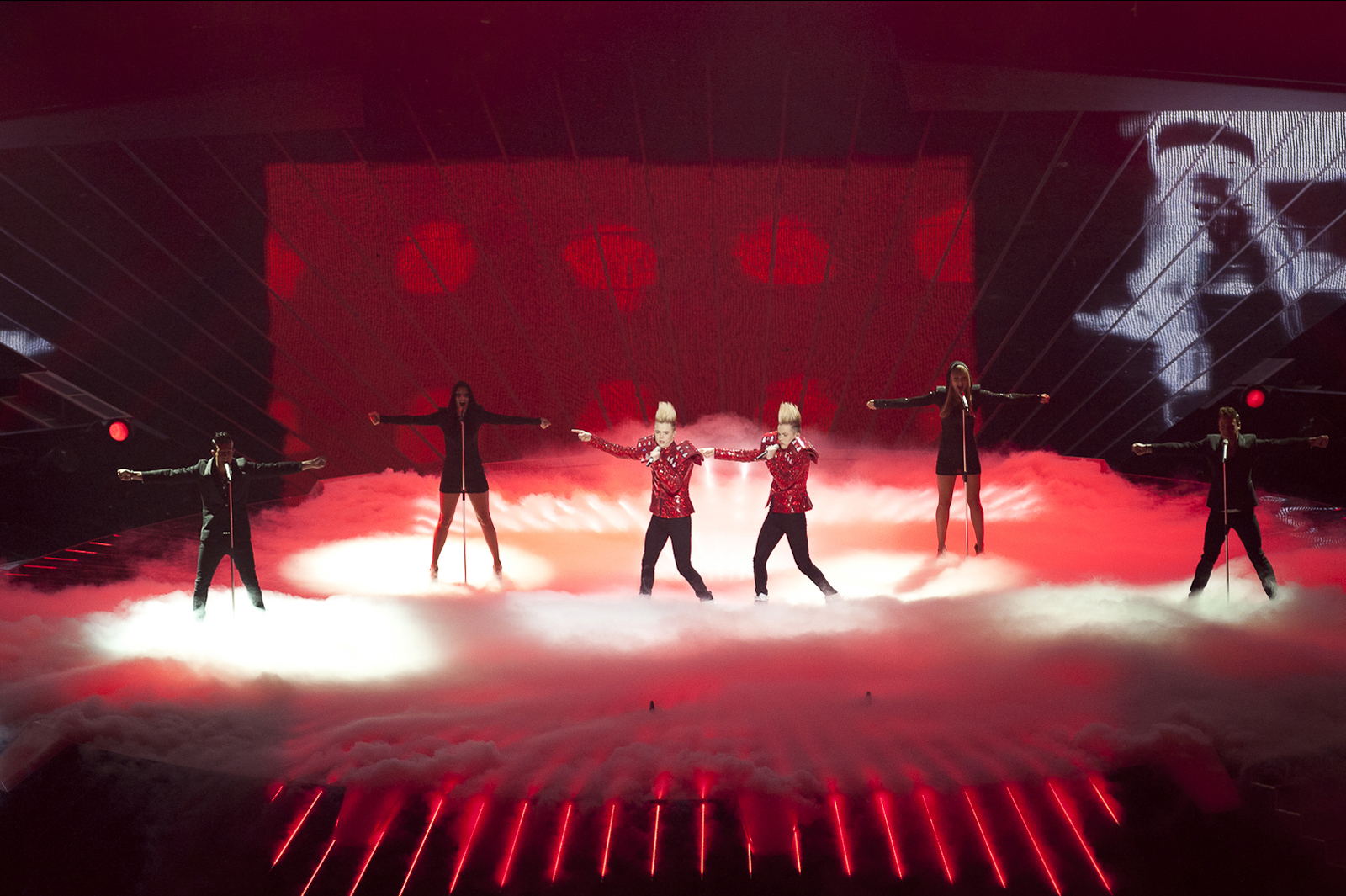
Jedward performing at Eurovision Song Contest, in 2011

Jedward won the Irish national selection for the Eurovision Song Contest again in 2012, this time with their song "Waterline". In May, Jedward performed "Waterline" at the Eurovision Song Contest 2012 in Baku, Azerbaijan. After qualifying from their semi-final, they eventually came in 19th place in the grand final. "Waterline" was also the lead single on the twins' third album Young Love, released in June. The tracks "Young Love" and "Luminous" were also released as singles. Jedward released the charity single and "unofficial" Irish UEFA Euro 2012 song "Put the Green Cape On", a reworking of "Lipstick". The duo embarked on the European leg of their Victory Tour in January, playing in Austria, Germany, Sweden, Finland and Estonia. This was followed by the Young Love Tour in Ireland in August. They also visited Singapore, where the new album had enjoyed popular success.

In June they ran as part of the 2012 Summer Olympics torch relay in Dublin on day 19 of the relay. The twins starred in their own TV series Jedward's Weird Wild World on UK TV channel 5*, with John and Edward humorously presenting a selection of popular internet videos. Over the Christmas and New Year period RTÉ broadcast the second series of their show OMG! Jedward's Dream Factory, and the second season of their BBC series Jedward's Big Adventure screened in early 2013. Over the festive season, Jedward starred in their third annual pantomime, Jedward & the Magic Lamp. In January 2013, the twins made a promotional visit to Toronto, Ontario, Canada, appearing twice on MuchMusic's New Music Live show and also made an appearance on Canada AM. While in Toronto, Jedward also filmed a promotional video for the Young Love album track "Happens in the Dark" and previewed a clip from the video on New Music Live. Later in the month, it was announced that Jedward's three-album contract with Universal Music Ireland would not be renewed.

The music video for "Happens in the Dark" was premiered on Much Music in March, with the video having been shot in Toronto earlier in the year. In April the twins filmed a video for the song "What's Your Number?" in New York City. Later in the month they made a promotional visit to Australia, including radio and television appearances. In June, Jedward joined the line-up of A Night for Christy, a gala concert in aid of Aslan frontman Christy Dignam. The twins performed Aslan's song "She's So Beautiful" with the band. In July the twins performed live shows in Cork and Limerick, with a UK live tour scheduled for September. In November the twins toured Australia, with performances in Perth, Melbourne and Sydney. While in Australia they also released the music video for Young Love album track "Can't Forget You". The video for "Can't Forget You" was shot at and around El Mirage Lake, in San Bernardino County, Los Angeles, California, United States..

=== 2014–present: Voice of a Rebel and other projects ===
In January 2014, the third series of their CBBC television programme Jedward's Big Adventure was broadcast. Due to its popularity, the series run was doubled to 10 episodes. They also provided weekly style commentary of the contestants in Sweden's Melodifestivalen competition and made a guest performance at the Melodifestivalen Second Chance show in early March. In April 2014, Jedward debuted their new single "Free Spirit" on Australian radio station KIIS 106.5. This was followed by news of the duo's fourth studio album to be released later in the year. The album will contain songs written and produced by Jedward. The duo's follow-up single "Ferocious" was released in November 2014, charting at No. 15 on the Irish singles chart. In November 2014 it was announced that John and Edward would join the cast of ITV's new circus reality show Get Your Act Together in 2015.

Between 2014 and 2018, they released several new self-penned singles and directed the accompanying music videos. The twins appeared on The Ray D'arcy Show in February 2017 and confirmed that they were working on their fourth studio album. They signed to Universal Music Singapore in April 2019, and released their fourth studio album, and first with UMSG, Voice of a Rebel on 20 June 2019 across Asia, followed by the rest of the world on 27 June.

== Philanthropy ==
Jedward were one of the highest rated charity ambassadors in Ireland for 2011. Jedward are ambassadors for the Irish Society for the Prevention of Cruelty to Children (ISPCC) and have fronted an ISPCC poster campaign. The proceeds of their Euro 2012 charity single "Put the Green Cape On" also went to the ISPCC. From 2010 to 2013 Jedward performed annually at the ChildLine Concert, which benefits the ISPCC's ChildLine service. Also in Ireland, Jedward have been involved with the ISPCA's My Dog Ate It campaign, and promote the Concern Worldwide Fast fundraiser. Jedward have also been involved with Comic Relief, Sport Relief and Children in Need, in the UK, as well as giving their time to visit children in hospitals.

== Other ventures ==
=== Advertising ===
In 2009 Jedward were the subject of a Tourism Ireland radio campaign, which made a tongue-in-cheek apology to the UK for Jedward's antics on The X Factor. In 2010, Jedward fronted an advertising campaign for Irish fast food chain Abrakebabra. Jedward have also fronted advertising campaigns for East Midlands Trains, Rowntree's Randoms, Disney Universe and a Travel Supermarket commercial with comedian Omid Djalili. The last was later banned after the UK Advertising Standards Authority ruled that the advert was misleading. In 2011, they fronted an advertising campaign for mobile network 3 Ireland, including their own Jedward-branded mobile phone.

=== Stage ===
Between 2010 and 2013, Jedward performed in an annual pantomime over the Christmas and New Year period. Based at the Olympia Theatre, Dublin, the pantomimes also starred Linda Martin. John and Edward played themselves and the shows featured Jedward songs. The twins' first show was Cinderella in 2010, where they played the fairy godbrothers. They returned in 2011 with a sell-out season of Jedward and the Beanstalk, and again in 2012 with Jedward and the Magic Lamp. In 2013 their fourth and last pantomime was Jedward in Beauty and the Beast.

== Impact ==
While on The X Factor, Jedward's fans included Pixie Lott and Robbie Williams. Taoiseach Brian Cowen also backed the singers, while Leona Lewis said that she worried about them. Two leading British political parties, Labour and the Conservatives, each released campaign posters parodying the twins. Former Prime Minister Gordon Brown came under fire in November 2009 for describing Jedward as "not very good" and later apologised for doing so. Following this, Louis Walsh stated "So Gordon Brown and Simon Cowell both have something in common: neither of them know what the public want." Brown's successor, David Cameron, admitted that he enjoyed watching The X Factor and that Jedward were his favourite act. Cameron also bought a T-shirt with their faces on it. The Irish Independent called Jedward "tone-deaf twins", even though the pair were voted more popular than The Beatles in a teenage poll. Comedian Oliver Callan has parodied them on his RTÉ 2 show Nob Nation. Their 2017 court case on merchandise rights was later the subject of a stage musical starring comedians Kevin McGahern and Tony Cantwell.

== Discography ==
Studio albums

- Planet Jedward (2010)
- Victory (2011)
- Young Love (2012)
- Voice of a Rebel (2019)

== Filmography ==
Films
Year	Title	Role
2012	Keith Lemon: The Film	Themselves
2015	Sharknado 3: Oh Hell No!	Themselves
2016	Sharknado: The 4th Awakens	Astro Techs
2017	Sharknado 5: Global Swarming	Mick and Cameron

Television
Year	Title	Role	Notes
2009	The X Factor	Themselves / Contestant	Series 6
2010	Jedward: Let Loose	Themselves	Television documentary
2010	Never Mind the Buzzcocks	Panelists	
2010	OMG It's Jedward	Themselves	Television documentary
2011	Anonymous	Themselves	Episode: "Seanie and Edwina"
2011	Celebrity Big Brother	Themselves / Contestant	Series 8, 3rd place
2011	Britain's Got Talent	Themselves / Backing Singers	Series 5
2011	8 Out of 10 Cats	Panelists	2 episodes
2011–12	Eurovision Song Contest	Themselves / Contestant	56th and 57th edition
2011–13	OMG! Jedward's Dream Factory	Themselves	Reality television
2012	Jedward's Weird Wild World	Themselves	Television documentary
2012–2014	Jedward's Big Adventure	Hosts	
2013	Dani's Castle	Themselves	Episode: "Bogmoor Rocks"
2015	Get Your Act Together	Themselves / Contestant	
2016	Livin' with Lucy	Themselves	Series 4
2017	Celebrity Big Brother	Themselves / Contestant	Series 19 Runners-up
2017	Single AF	Themselves / Contestant	
2017	Jedward's Xmas House Party	Hosts	
2018	Celebrity 100% Hotter	Themselves	
2021	The Big Deal	Themselves / Judges	
2025	Silence Is Golden	Themselves	Series 1, episode 3
2026	Celebrity Ex on the Beach	Themselves / Contestant	Series 4
2026	Big Brother	Themselves	Series 23, 6 episodes

== Awards and nominations ==
Year	Award	Category	Work	Result	Ref.
2009	Loaded Laftas Awards	Funniest Double Act	Jedward	Nominated	
2010	Sony Radio Academy Awards	Best Promotion	Jedward	Won	
2011	Loaded Laftas Awards	Funniest TV Personality	Jedward	Nominated	
2011	Marcel Bezençon Award	Best song	"Lipstick"	Won	
2012	IFTA Awards	Best Children's/Youth Programme	OMG! Jedward's Dream Factory	Nominated	
2012	Bord Gais Energy Social Media Awards	Best Online Program	OMG! Jedward's Dream Factory	Won	
2013	IFTA Awards	Best Children's/Youth Programme	OMG! Jedward's Dream Factory	Nominated	

== See also ==
- The X Factor (British TV series) series 6

Awards and achievements
Preceded by Niamh Kavanagh with "It's for You"	Ireland in the Eurovision Song Contest; 2011	Succeeded by Jedward with "Waterline"
Preceded by Jedward with "Lipstick"	Ireland in the Eurovision Song Contest; 2012	Succeeded by Ryan Dolan with "Only Love Survives"
