= Victory (Jedward album) =

Studio album by Jedward
- Released: 5 August 2011
- Recorded: 2011
- Genres: Pop, synthpop
- Length: 38:42
- Label: Universal Music International
- Producers: DEEKAY and Dan Priddy

Jedward chronology
Planet Jedward (European version) (2011)	Victory (2011)	Young Love (2012)

Singles from Victory
- 1. "Lipstick" Released: 12 February 2011; 2. "Bad Behaviour" Released: 1 July 2011; 3. "Wow Oh Wow" Released: 18 November 2011

Victory is the second studio album by Irish pop duo Jedward. The album was released on 5 August 2011 in Ireland and on 15 August 2011 in the United Kingdom. It was the 18th best selling album in Ireland in the year 2011. It was also certified double platinum in Ireland that year, thus becoming the duo's second consecutive album to receive that certification in their home country.

== Background ==
Jedward began recording tracks for the album in January 2011. In February 2011, it was announced that the pair would be representing Ireland at the 2011 Eurovision Song Contest, after winning a nationwide competition against four other acts. The pair announced the song they would representing with would be "Lipstick", a song recorded for their upcoming second studio album. "Lipstick" was subsequently released as the album's lead single in February 2011. In the final of the competition, Jedward scored 119 points and finished 8th, giving Ireland its best result in eleven years. The single was released across Europe following the final, and three months after its release, it peaked at #1 on the Irish Singles Chart.

In March 2011, a 30-second preview of a song entitled "Bad Behaviour" was posted on the twins' official YouTube channel. A further clip was posted in May, this time of a song entitled "Distortion". Both songs were previewed on tour dates for the Planet Jedward Tour. In June 2011, Jedward announced that recording on the album had been completed, and the album was scheduled for release in August. In July 2011, the track listing for the album was announced via Digital Spy. On 1 July, Jedward announced that the title of the album would be Victory. On the same day, the album's second single, "Bad Behaviour", was released via iTunes, and on 8 July, the song became the duo's third single to peak at #1 in Ireland. Upon its release in August 2011, the album peaked at #1 on the Irish Albums Chart.

Following Jedward's success in Eurovision, a new version of their album Planet Jedward was released in Europe. Despite its name, it was based around songs recorded for Victory, using seven previously unreleased tracks from the as yet unreleased album.

In September 2011, the album was released across Europe and Asia, complete with three bonus tracks that did not appear on the original version. In November 2011, the album's third single, "Wow Oh Wow", was released.

"Everyday Superstar" was released as a promotional single in August 2011.

== Track listing ==
No.	Title	Writer(s)	Producer(s)	Length
1.	"Lipstick"	Daniel Priddy, Lars Halvor Jensen, Martin Michael Larsson	DEEKAY	3:52
2.	"Bad Behaviour"	Daniel Priddy, Reuben Priddy	Daniel Priddy	2:54
3.	"Everyday Superstar"	Johannes Jorgensen, Lindy Robbins, Lars Halvor Jensen, Drew Ryan Scott	DEEKAY	3:01
4.	"My Miss America"	Allan Eshuijs, Lars Halvor Jensen, Simon Hermansen	DEEKAY and Gettic	3:21
5.	"Your Biggest Fan"	Allan Eshuijs, Simon Hermansen, Lars Halvor Jensen	DEEKAY and Gettic	3:53
6.	"Distortion"	Daniel Priddy	Daniel Priddy	2:37
7.	"Pop Rocket"	Martin Michael Larsson, Alex James, Lars Halvor Jensen	DEEKAY	3:20
8.	"Saturday Night"	Daniel Priddy	Daniel Priddy	3:11
9.	"Techno Girl"	Daniel Priddy	Daniel Priddy	3:07
10.	"Wow Oh Wow"	Oritsé Williams, Johannes Joergensen, Savan Kotecha, Daniel Klein	DEEKAY	3:20
11.	"Celebrity"	Daniel Priddy	Daniel Priddy	3:39
12.	"Hold The World"	Lars Halvor Jensen, Drew Ryan Scott, Reed Vertelney, Martin Michael Larsson	DEEKAY	3:29

iTunes Bonus Track
No.	Title	Writer(s)	Producer(s)	Length
13.	"Bad Behaviour" (Wideboys Radio Edit)	Daniel Priddy, Reuben Priddy	Daniel Priddy, Wideboys	3:34

European Edition Bonus Tracks
No.	Title	Writer(s)	Producer(s)	Length
13.	"Go Getter"	Daniel Priddy, Lars Halvor Jensen, Martin Michael Larsson	DEEKAY	3:42
14.	"Get Up And Dance"	Allan Eshuijs, Simon Hermansen, Lars Halvor Jensen	DEEKAY and Gettic	3:28
15.	"Bad Behaviour" (Wideboys Radio Edit)	Daniel Priddy, Reuben Priddy	Daniel Priddy, Wideboys	3:34

Japanese Bonus Track
No.	Title	Writer(s)	Producer(s)	Length
16.	"Lipstick" (Instrumental)	Daniel Priddy, Lars Halvor Jensen, Martin Michael Larsson	DEEKAY	3:52

== Chart performance ==
Chart (2011)	Peak position
Irish Albums Chart	1
Scottish Albums Chart	31
UK Albums Chart	34
