= Bad Behaviour (song) =

2011 single by Jedward

Single by Jedward

from the album Victory
- Released: 1 July 2011
- Recorded: 2011
- Genre: Pop, electropop
- Length: 2:54
- Label: Universal
- Songwriter(s): Daniel Priddy, Reuben Priddy
- Producer(s): Daniel Priddy

Jedward singles chronology
| "Lipstick" (2011) | "Bad Behaviour" (2011) | "Wow Oh Wow" (2011) |

Music video
- "Bad Behaviour" on YouTube

"Bad Behaviour" is the second single from Irish pop duo Jedward's second studio album, Victory. The single was released on 1 July 2011 in Ireland, and 4 July 2011 in the UK. The single peaked at No. 1 on the Irish Singles Chart.

== Music video ==
The music video for "Bad Behaviour" premiered on YouTube on 29 June 2011. The video was filmed on 14 May 2011 and was directed by American music video director Rage. With a premise inspired by the films Home Alone and Risky Business, John and Edward play two brothers who throw a chaotic party when their parents go away for the weekend. The video received its first television play on 4Music on 30 June. American gossip blogger Perez Hilton makes a cameo appearance in the video.

== Track listing ==
| No. | Title | Length |
|---|---|---|
| 1. | "Bad Behaviour" (Radio Edit) | 2:54 |

== Chart performance ==
| Chart (2011) | Peak position |
|---|---|
| Ireland (IRMA) | 1 |
| Latvia (European Hit Radio) | 16 |
| South Korea (GAON) | 43 |

== Release history ==
| Country | Release date | Label |
|---|---|---|
| Ireland | 1 July 2011 | Universal Music Group |
| United Kingdom | 4 July 2011 | Universal Music Group |
| Germany | 15 July 2011 | Universal Music Group |
