= All the Small Things =

1999 single by Blink-182

- Cover used for the US CD single release. Other editions were released using various alternate shots.

Single by Blink-182

from the album Enema of the State
- B-side: "M+Ms" (US); "Dumpweed" (live) (worldwide)
- Released: September 28, 1999
- Recorded: January–March 1999
- Genre: Pop-punk; power pop; pop rock; alternative rock
- Length: 2:48
- Label: MCA
- Songwriters: Tom DeLonge; Mark Hoppus
- Producer: Jerry Finn

Blink-182 singles chronology
"What's My Age Again?" (1999)	"All the Small Things" (1999)	"Adam's Song" (2000)

Music video
- "All the Small Things" on YouTube

"All the Small Things" is a song by the American rock band Blink-182. It was released in September 1999 as the second single from the band's third studio album, Enema of the State, through MCA Records. Built on bright, three-chord pop-punk and a "na na na" hook, the song was written primarily by guitarist Tom DeLonge as an ode to his girlfriend. He structured it as a deliberately simple, radio-ready pop song, drawing inspiration from the direct, melodic minimalism of the Ramones. The song was produced by Jerry Finn.

The accompanying music video, directed by Marcos Siega, became a defining element of the song's impact. It parodies the visual language of contemporary teen-pop acts such as the Backstreet Boys and NSYNC, featuring exaggerated choreography, stylized beach photo shoots, and tongue-in-cheek recreations of boy-band tropes. The clip became a staple on MTV, where its self-aware comic sensibility and high rotation significantly expanded the band's audience. It also pushed the band into the pop spotlight they were skewering and sparked debate; some critics argued the line between spoof and participation had grown thin.

Upon release, "All the Small Things" quickly emerged as one of the era's most commercially successful pop-punk singles, charting internationally and propelling Blink-182 to mainstream stardom. It became the band's highest-charting single in the United States, peaking at number six on the Billboard Hot 100, topping the Modern Rock Tracks chart, and reaching number two in the United Kingdom. It has since become a cross-generational pop standard, embraced as a karaoke staple and absorbed into popular culture through films, TV, video games, sports teams, and countless cover versions.

== Background ==
By the end of the 1990s, Blink-182 were on their way to becoming one of the biggest rock bands of the turn of the century. The trio—composed of vocalist/guitarist Tom DeLonge, vocalist/bassist Mark Hoppus, and new addition drummer Travis Barker—had come up playing in Southern Californian punk clubs and on the Warped Tour festival circuit. Their penchant for off-color humor and fast-paced punk rock had caught the interest of Universal Music Group, which signed the band to its MCA label. With a higher budget and assistance from the veteran engineer Jerry Finn—who mixed Green Day's Dookie (1994)—the band set out to make their next album, which came to be called Enema of the State.

"All the Small Things" can be traced back to when the trio first began developing songs for the album at their rehearsal space at DML Studios in their hometown of San Diego, California. DeLonge had just bought his first home there, and bought two to three thousand dollars' worth of foam padding to insulate his room. By this point, most of the tracks on Enema of the State had been written, but DeLonge felt the album needed "just one song that was really catchy and basic." "I remember thinking, 'The label's gonna want a song for the radio – so here's one,'" said DeLonge. "It was obvious from the beginning it would fit that format." DeLonge had wanted to write a track including "na na na's" as an ode to one of his favorite bands, the Ramones. Early demos listed it as "Ramones-style song", and the original working title of the track was "Babycakes-Buttermuffin".

DeLonge wrote the track about his girlfriend Jennifer Jenkins, to whom he was later married from 2001 to 2019. The lyrics "She left me roses by the stairs / Surprises let me know she cares" are based on a time Jenkins did just that after DeLonge returned home late from recording.

It was one of the last songs we recorded, because it was [so] simple it wasn't that much fun to play. But once we put it all together and played it as a band we all looked at each other and said, 'This song's huge!' [...] Once we recorded this song and heard it, it gave us the chills. We just looked at each other and knew we had this little piece of magic. We knew that thing was going to be a gigantic thing, I don't know how, but we just felt it straight away.

== Composition ==
"All The Small Things"
A 25-second sample from "All The Small Things".

"All the Small Things" has been called a pop-punk, punk rock, and power pop song. The song is credited to Tom DeLonge and Mark Hoppus. Though drummer Travis Barker helped write the songs on Enema of the State, only Hoppus and DeLonge received songwriting credits, as Barker was technically a hired musician, not yet an official band member. The song is composed in the key of C major and is set in time signature of common time with a driving tempo of 150 beats per minute. DeLonge mainly sings lead vocals, with Hoppus providing harmonies at key moments. The vocal range of the song spans from G_{4} to F_{5}. The song is two minutes and forty-eight seconds long. Lyrically, the song centers on small gestures of affection and reassurance within a romantic relationship.

The song combines upbeat punk instrumentation with polished pop songwriting and melodic hooks. Built around bright guitar riffs, driving power chords, and a steady mid-tempo drum beat from Barker, the song features a simple verse-chorus arrangement. The track opens with palm-muted guitar chords before shifting into the first verse. Much of the guitar writing centers on palm-muted eighth-note rhythms in the verses before opening into louder sustained power chords during the chorus. The guitar riff for the song cycles around chords C major, F and G (I, IV and V in C), a familiar chord progression. The texture on the track is due to several overdubs playing various inversions and extensions of the main chords. The bass guitar stays on C while the guitars move to F, creating a 2nd inversion chord. The song utilizes short lyrical phrases in each verse, sometimes only four to five syllables. Before the chorus begins, the song features the lines "Say it ain't so / I will not go / turn the lights off / carry me home," which lead into a catchy "na-na-na" refrain. The chorus is further enhanced by a bright synthesizer part performed by Roger Joseph Manning Jr., a session musician known for his work with Beck and Jellyfish. Harmonically, the arrangement emphasizes diatonic major-key movement and simple chord relationships.

== Reception ==
"All the Small Things" introduced Blink-182 to new listeners on a mass scale. "This was the song that took the band from theaters and clubs into arenas", observed Andy Greene at Rolling Stone. It has been credited with popularizing pop-punk in the mainstream. Initial critical reviews were positive. Q called the song "one of those power-pop tunes that the Americans get so right," joking, "[it] has more hooks than the Fishing Channel." Gavin Edwards of Rolling Stone termed it an "irresistible pop-punk anthem," while it was labeled "a pop punk watershed" by Jonah Weiner of Blender. Steve Appleford at the Los Angeles Times praised the song as "angsty, juvenile, endearingly cute and loaded with irresistible hooks," while Mikael Wood, writing for the same publication, observed that the tune "deliver[s] a potent mixture of humor and melancholy, hope and resignation." Writing for the San Francisco Examiner, Jane Ganahl described "All the Small Things" as "the most catchy single since 'Semi-Charmed Life'."

The song is now widely viewed as cross-generational classic. Maeve McDermott, for USA Today, called it the band's defining hit. Steven Hyden, writing for now-defunct culture website Grantland, said "I've come to view Blink as arguably the best radio singles band of its era; songs like "All the Small Things" stand the test of time as ace pop tunes." Amanda Petrusich, in a piece analyzing the band's longevity for The New Yorker, writes: "[Blink's] finest moments are barked in aggrieved-teen shorthand, like this verse from "All the Small Things": 'Late night / Come home / Work sucks / I know.'" Tom Breihan at Stereogum ranked the "soaringly sincere" ballad at a 10/10, while Jeremy Gordon at Pitchfork viewed the song as "surprisingly sensitive [...] the fizzy pleasure of the melody captures the Hallmark simplicity of young love."

== Commercial performance ==
"All the Small Things" became one of Blink-182's biggest global crossover hits, achieving strong chart success across North America, Europe, and Oceania. The song performed exceptionally well in major English-speaking markets. In the U.S., the song debuted at number 89 on the all-genre Billboard Hot 100 chart for the week of December 4, 1999 and eventually peaked at number six in January 2000, the highest the band received on the chart. Radio airplay was its major strength; the song charted on both pop and rock radio formats, including #8 on US Pop Airplay, #29 on US Adult Pop Airplay, #9 on UK Airplay, and #14 on the European Radio Top 50. It topped Billboard's Modern Rock Tracks. It entered and peaked at number two on the UK Singles Chart in March 2000, beaten to the top of the chart by "Bag It Up" by Geri Halliwell. It also peaked at number two in Scotland, and topped the UK Rock & Metal chart.

Internationally, the song showed broad mainstream appeal. It reached the top 10 in numerous countries, including Australia (#8), Austria (#4), Ireland (#7), Italy (#6), Sweden (#7), Romania (#6), Portugal (#10), New Zealand (#10), and the Eurochart Hot 100 (#6). In Germany it peaked at #11, while Switzerland and Spain also saw strong performances. The song's longevity and sustained popularity were reflected in its year-end chart rankings for 2000. In the United States, it finished at #40 on the Billboard Hot 100 year-end chart, #38 on the Mainstream Top 40 chart, and #6 on the Modern Rock Tracks year-end ranking, confirming it as one of the year's biggest rock songs. Internationally, it also placed on several national year-end charts; strong placements on airplay-focused year-end lists, including #48 on UK Airplay and #100 on Europe Airplay, further showed how heavily the song rotated across radio throughout the year.

The song remained a solid catalog choice for top 40 stations. The song had accumulated over 500,000 plays on US pop radio by 2011.

=== Sales ===
"All the Small Things" has since sold 2,400,000 copies in the UK and been certified quadruple Platinum. The single was certified Platinum by the Australian Recording Industry Association. It was one of the top-selling singles in America in 2000, with Nielsen SoundScan estimating its sales at 500,000 copies.

== Music video ==
=== Filming ===
The music video for "All the Small Things" was directed by Marcos Siega, and mocks boy bands and contemporary pop videos of that era. The video recreates and satirizes visual tropes commonly used in late-1990s pop music videos, including dramatic beach scenes, choreographed dance numbers, slow-motion glamour shots, and emotional close-ups. It features the trio doing parodies of acts such as Backstreet Boys (most famously the "I Want It That Way" video), 98 Degrees, and NSYNC. The clip also features send-ups of Britney Spears' "Sometimes", and Christina Aguilera's "Genie in a Bottle" video. Siega had previously helmed the music video for the group's previous single, "What's My Age Again?", which had raised their profile considerably, especially on MTV. Many of the videos parodied had only recently debuted that year, making the parody especially relevant.

Siega, who had roots in punk and hardcore, wanted the video to feel disruptive and counterculture, and figured the best way to achieve these goals was through parody. "We were being bombarded with the same music video for every boy band, every pop artist," he recalled in a 2025 podcast appearance. He wrote the song's treatment and submitted it to the band's label, MCA. The band were on board: Tom DeLonge found the concept well-within the band's sense of humor, and Barker was willing to go along with anything, according to Siega. Bassist Mark Hoppus, however, was adamantly against the video. He felt the idea wasn't funny enough, and later conceded he was then not as familiar with the teen-pop videos it aims to lampoon. Despite the label emphasizing the group as a major commercial priority, the members reportedly remained conscious of production costs. "They had come out of that same indie rock scene that we had done videos for, so while the label was talking about [a huge budget], the guys were smart," said producer Shirley Moyers. "They said, 'No matter what they're saying about throwing all this money around, we know that ultimately – somehow, somewhere – that money is coming out of us. So, think of us when you're budgeting.'"

The music video was shot on location from August 5–6 at Van Nuys Airport and Santa Monica State Beach. Once filming began, the trio committed fully to the comedic performances and choreography. Moyers later recalled that the band realized the concept would only succeed if they "went all out," while choreographer Donielle Artese stated the members enthusiastically learned and performed the synchronized dance routines. The band had to wear tight-fitting wardrobe to match the boy band styles. Additional comedic details included the use of fake crooked teeth to contrast the polished appearance associated with boy band performers. The production also featured cameo appearances from professional dancers connected to the late-1990s pop scene, including future Pussycat Dolls member Carmit Bachar. Siega showed the group the finished cut and Hoppus was still steadfast in his stance against it: "Everyone kept assuring me it was going to be huge, and I kept saying no," Hoppus remembered in his 2025 memoir, Fahrenheit-182, though he concedes he was proven wrong. An additional film crew was there capturing footage for MTV's Making the Video, which debuted the clip on September 20, 1999.

Notably, the filming of the video was where Hoppus ended up meeting his future wife, Skye Everly, then a talent executive for MTV. According to a 2004 interview, Everly initially said no to dating Hoppus. "Tom [DeLonge] always used to embarrass me. Any girl he'd talk to, he'd say, 'Hey, you wanna go on a date with Mark?' He asked Skye [Everly], my wife, who looked at me and said 'No.' That's how it all started."

=== Popularity and commentary ===
"All the Small Things" quickly became the band's most successful music video, and cemented the band's image as video stars. On MTV's Total Request Live, it had to be retired after 65 days on the countdown. It won Best Group Video at the 2000 MTV Video Music Awards, and also nabbed Best Video at the Kerrang! Awards the same year.

The "All the Small Things" video drew extensive commentary for the way its satire blurred into reality. Despite being conceived as a spoof of late-’90s boy-band tropes, it pushed the band toward the same pop spotlight they were mocking. Director Marcos Siega later noted that instead of offending pop fans, the video helped cement the band at the same commercial level as their targets: "I was a little surprised it went over so well," he said. Critics and journalists echoed this view: some argued that Blink-182 were just as much a major-label product as the rest. "Blink now had the backing of a major record company [...] just like the synthesized pop acts they were spoofing," said British journalist Tim Footman. Others suggested the band's playful imitation ultimately became indistinguishable from the real thing. Matt Diehl, author of the book My So-Called Punk, called this basis for satire thin: "To seasoned ears, Blink-182 sounded and looked just as manufactured as the pop idols they were poking fun at." This dynamic resurfaced years later when One Direction, a boy band of a later era, filmed a video on the same beach. Retrospective commentary framed the video as prophetic, especially in context of the mall-punk rise. Kelefa Sanneh, writing for The New York Times, suggested that "in the [following] years top-selling punk-inspired acts like Avril Lavigne and Good Charlotte helped turn Blink-182's parody into reality as punk rock became the new teen pop."

For the band, this commentary felt both inaccurate and distracting. Already frustrated with being labeled “the naked band” after their previous video, they noticed their image was being misconstrued internationally. "The very thing we were mocking was beginning to embrace us. It got even stranger when we traveled abroad, and our image got lost in translation," Hoppus wrote. During a visit to TRL in Milan, they were greeted with the intensity of teen-idol fandom, while at the Independent Days Festival in Bologna they were met with hostility and pelted with bottles and rocks upon launching into "All the Small Things". These extremes highlighted for the band the need for greater control over their branding and presentation; according to Hoppus, they were "furious with [their] label" and determined to avoid being misrepresented in the future.

== Legacy ==
"All the Small Things" continues to enjoy popularity decades after its release; it is one of several songs to count over one billion streams on Spotify, joining the platform's "Billions Club". The song has been a staple of the band's live performances since its release. Its ubiquity has made it complex for the threesome: Barker noted that over time, playing the song became tiresome. "With 'All the Small Things,' my band at one point were like, 'We never want to play that song, and we never want to hear it ever again.' And then it comes around, and you're like, 'This song is actually awesome.' And you're proud of what you wrote." Hoppus concurred: "It's a really simple song, we've played it billion times, everyone's sick of it. But now I just remember how lucky we are to be onstage playing them." DeLonge's voice has deepened over the years, leading him to mock the original recording in later years – in a 2022 interview, he compared his vocals on the song to Hanson and quipped, "I sound like I'm fucking four years old."

The song proved influential on the pop punk genre, with a host of young musicians emulating its sound. Former Simple Plan bassist David Desrosiers noted that the song "blended punk attitude with pop songwriting so much better than other bands." Judah & the Lion drummer Spencer Cross, meanwhile, has noted the song was "one of the first songs I remember getting hooked on, playing it over and over again."

The song has become a popular karaoke choice, particularly for millennials who came of age listening to the song. In a 2022 piece, GQ writer Chris Gayomali humorously suggests that "if you were born in the 1980s or early '90s, even if you were never a fan or a willful listener of a Blink song, the lyrics to their biggest hits—"All the Small Things", "I Miss You"—are somehow already encoded into your subconscious, sitting there, just a few blood-alcohol-content percentages away from being karaoke'd without a teleprompter." Billboard columnist Josh Glicksman ranked it among the best karaoke singalongs, observing: "Its communal nature affords it flexibility [...] Bring out every air instrument in the arsenal."

=== Accolades ===
Region	Country	Accolade	Year	Rank
NME	United Kingdom	50 Most Explosive Choruses	2014	16
Rolling Stone	United States	100 Greatest Pop Songs	2000	94
VH1	United States	Top 100 Greatest Songs of the 2000s	2011	53

* denotes an unordered list

== In popular culture ==
"All the Small Things" has seen extensive use in popular culture, covered by a number of artists from different genres, and soundtracking video games, movies, and television programs. The band has performed the song on several late-night talk shows, including twice on The Tonight Show with Jay Leno a decade apart, and on Saturday Night Live during the song's original promotional push. The song was synched for usage in Buffy the Vampire Slayer, Sabrina the Teenage Witch, Boston Legal, Knuckles, and for the band's 2003 guest appearance on The Simpsons; it has also been referenced in the 2011 Family Guy season 9 episode It's A Trap!, where Peter Griffin (voiced by Seth MacFarlane) mistakes it as a Sum 41 song. In film, the song was licensed for use in Charlie's Angels (2000), Clockstoppers (2002), and Hope Springs (2003). The song has been used frequently in music video games; "All the Small Things" is a playable track in Guitar Hero 5, Guitar Hero: On Tour, Guitar Hero Live, Rock Band, Rock Band Track Pack Volume 1 and its iOS port, and Fortnite Festival. When the Guitar Hero series relaunched with Guitar Hero Live in 2015, it was among the game's most-played tracks on its online service. Covers are present in the video games Rock Revolution and Donkey Konga.

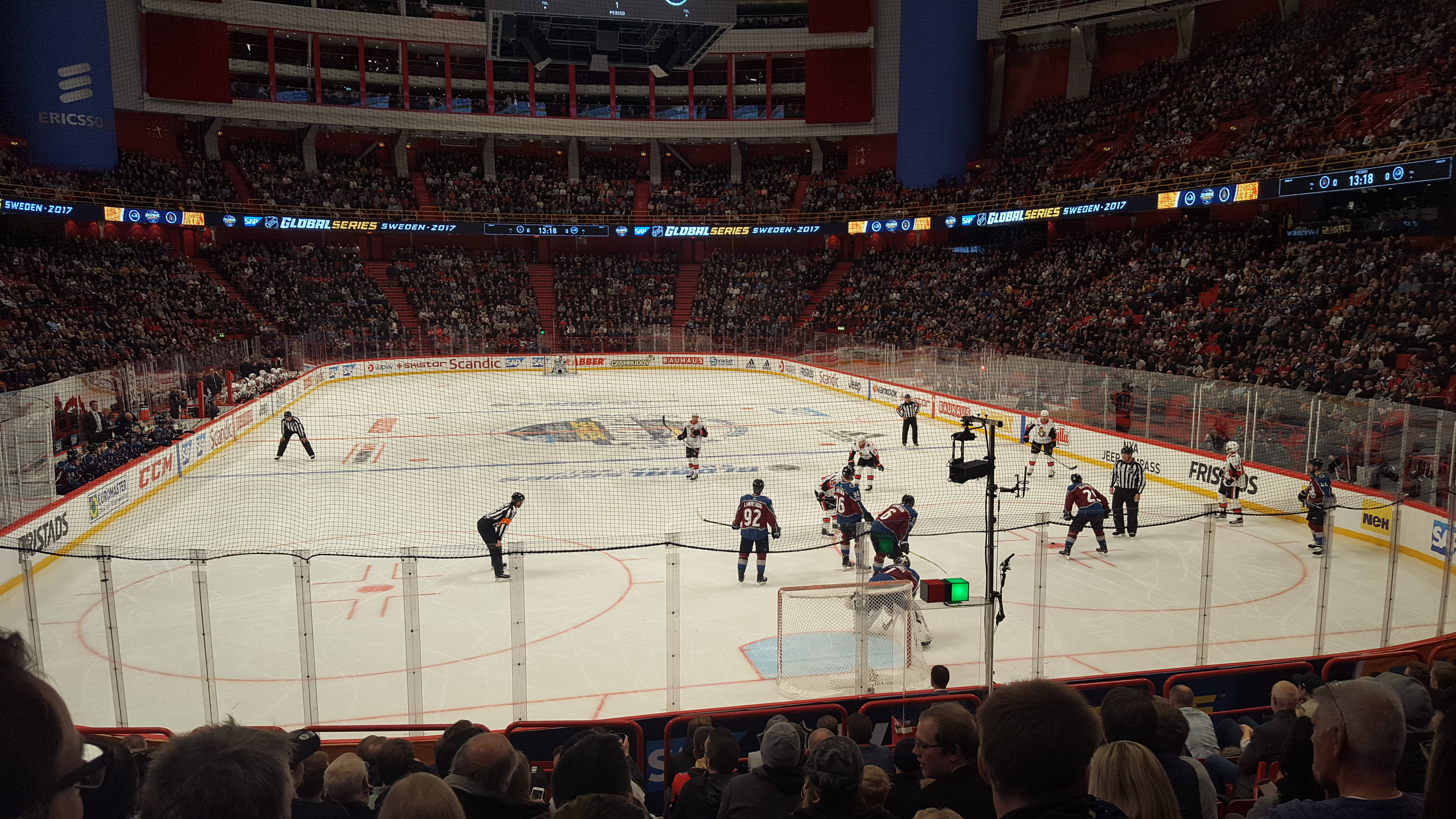
The song has come to be used by the Colorado Avalanche at home games.

A 2020 advertising campaign from Dunkin', announcing autumn drinks, used a pun alluding to the tune: "All the Fall Things". It was used that same year in a commercial for BMW. The song has been covered by All Time Low, Kelly Clarkson, Charlie Puth, GFOTY, Evan Stephens Hall, Kidz Bop, Nick and Joe Jonas, Avril Lavigne, Machine Gun Kelly, Middle Kids, Twenty One Pilots, Weezer, and Postmodern Jukebox (which is used in the 2022 John Lewis Christmas advert). It has also seen a dance remix by DJ Sharkoffs. The virtual band Alvin and the Chipmunks covered the song for their 2008 album Undeniable, and the song was used for the characters' live-action film and accompanying video game. The song's association with the characters has prompted Hoppus to joke at concerts, "Not to brag, [but] you might recognize this next song from the Alvin and the Chipmunks movie."

Like many famous rock songs, "All the Small Things" has come to be used in chants at sporting events. In 2019, the NHL team the Colorado Avalanche began playing the song during the third period of home games with a comfortable lead and after overtime wins. The tradition has gained more prominence as the 2021–22 team won the Stanley Cup Finals. The Athletic's book about the 2021–22 team was titled Carry Me Home, a lyric from the song's refrain. Hoppus acknowledged the Avalanche's tradition on Twitter, calling it "amazing", and appeared at the 2022 home opener to lead the crowd in singing the song, and remarking, "Thank you so much for taking our band along or the ride, it means the absolute world to us."

Stand-up comedian Adam Devine referenced the song in a routine that aired on Comedy Central's Goddamn Comedy Jam, where he revealed that he had lost his virginity to the song in high school.

== Track listings ==
All tracks are written by Blink-182.

"All the Small Things" US single CD and cassette
No.	Title	Length
1.	"All the Small Things"	2:54
2.	"M+M's"	2:39

"All the Small Things" UK single CD (1)
No.	Title	Length
1.	"All the Small Things"	2:48
2.	"Dumpweed" (live)	2:24
3.	"What's My Age Again?" (live)	2:58

"All the Small Things" UK single CD (2)
No.	Title	Length
1.	"All the Small Things"	2:55
2.	"All the Small Things" (live)	3:15
3.	"Dammit" (live)	2:38
4.	"All the Small Things" (video)	3:00

"All the Small Things" UK single cassette
No.	Title	Length
1.	"All the Small Things"	2:48
2.	"Dammit" (live)	2:45

"All the Small Things" Australian single CD (1)
No.	Title	Length
1.	"All the Small Things"	2:48
2.	"Dammit" (live in Los Angeles)	3:05
3.	"Family Reunion" (live in Los Angeles)	0:51
4.	"I Won't Be Home for Christmas"	3:16

"All the Small Things" Australian single CD (2)
No.	Title	Length
1.	"All the Small Things" (single edit)	2:54
2.	"Dumpweed" (live in London)	3:25
3.	"What's My Age Again?" (live in London)	3:18
4.	"All the Small Things" (live in London)	4:05
5.	"Dammit" (live in London)	2:36

"All the Small Things / What's My Age Again? 4' tiny vinyl
No.	Title	Length
1.	"All the Small Things"	2:48
2.	"What's My Age Again?"	2:26

- All live tracks on the UK release were recorded at the Electric Ballroom, London, England, on November 30, 1999.

== Credits and personnel ==
=== Original version ===
Credits adapted from the liner notes of Enema of the State.
Locations

- Recorded at Signature Sound, Studio West, San Diego California; Mad Hatter Studios, The Bomb Factory, Los Angeles, California; Conway Recording Studios, Hollywood, California; Big Fish Studios, Encinitas, California
- Mixed at Conway Recording Studios, Hollywood, California; South Beach Studios, Miami, Florida

Personnel

Blink-182

- Tom DeLonge – guitar, lead vocals, songwriting
- Mark Hoppus – bass guitar, backing vocals, songwriting
- Travis Barker – drums

Additional musicians

- Roger Joseph Manning Jr. – keyboards

Production

- Jerry Finn – production
- Tom Lord-Alge – mixing engineer
- Sean O'Dwyer – recording engineer
- Darrel Harvey – assistant engineer
- John Nelson – assistant engineer
- Robert Read – assistant engineer
- Mike Fasano – drum technician
- Rick DeVoe – management
- Gary Ashley – A&R
- Brian Gardner – mastering engineer

== Charts ==
=== Weekly charts ===
Chart (1999–2000)	Peak position
Australia (ARIA)	8
Austria (Ö3 Austria Top 40)	4
Belgium (Ultratop 50 Flanders)	15
Canada Top Singles (RPM)	18
Canada Rock/Alternative (RPM)	10
Europe (Eurochart Hot 100)	6
European Radio Top 50 (Music & Media)	14
Germany (GfK)	11
Iceland (Íslenski Listinn Topp 40)	8
Ireland (IRMA)	7
Italy (FIMI)	6
Netherlands (Dutch Top 40)	21
Netherlands (Single Top 100)	39
New Zealand (Recorded Music NZ)	10
Norway (VG-lista)	12
Poland Airplay (Music & Media)	19
Portugal (AFP)	10
Romania (Romanian Top 100)	6
Scottish Singles Sales (Official Charts)	2
Spain (Top 40 Radio)	13
Sweden (Sverigetopplistan)	7
Switzerland (Schweizer Hitparade)	14
UK Singles (Official Charts)	2
UK Airplay (Music Week)	9
UK Rock & Metal (Official Charts)	1
US Billboard Hot 100	6
US Adult Pop Airplay (Billboard)	29
US Alternative Airplay (Billboard)	1
US Pop Airplay (Billboard)	8

Chart (2022)	Peak position
US Hot Rock & Alternative Songs (Billboard)	22

=== Year-end charts ===
Chart (1999)	Position
US Modern Rock Tracks (Billboard)	94

Chart (2000)	Position
Australia (ARIA)	52
Belgium (Ultratop 50 Flanders)	79
Europe (Eurochart Hot 100)	70
Europe Airplay (Music & Media)	100
Germany (Media Control)	71
Ireland (IRMA)	60
Romania (Romanian Top 100)	67
Sweden (Hitlistan)	63
Switzerland (Schweizer Hitparade)	86
UK Singles (OCC)	67
UK Airplay (Music Week)	48
US Billboard Hot 100	40
US Adult Top 40 (Billboard)	65
US Mainstream Top 40 (Billboard)	38
US Modern Rock Tracks (Billboard)	6

== Certifications ==
Region	Certification	Certified units/sales
Australia (ARIA)	Platinum	70,000^{^}
Brazil (Pro-Música Brasil)	Gold	30,000^{‡}
Denmark (IFPI Danmark)	Gold	45,000^{‡}
Germany (BVMI)	Platinum	500,000^{‡}
Italy (FIMI)	2× Platinum	200,000^{‡}
New Zealand (RMNZ)	5× Platinum	150,000^{‡}
Spain (Promusicae)	Platinum	60,000^{‡}
Sweden (GLF)	Gold	15,000^{^}
United Kingdom (BPI)	4× Platinum	2,400,000^{‡}
United States	—	500,000
^{^} Shipments figures based on certification alone.^{‡} Sales+streaming figures based on certification alone.

== Release history ==
Region	Date	Format(s)	Label(s)	Ref.
United States	September 28, 1999	Mainstream rock; active rock; alternative radio	MCA	
United States	January 18, 2000	CD; cassette	MCA	
United Kingdom	March 13, 2000	CD; cassette	MCA	

== Jedward version ==
"All the Small Things"

Single by Jedward

from the album Planet Jedward
- Released: July 16, 2010
- Genre: Pop
- Length: 2:48
- Label: Universal
- Songwriters: Tom DeLonge; Mark Hoppus

Jedward singles chronology
"Under Pressure (Ice Ice Baby)" (2010)	"All the Small Things" (2010)	"Lipstick" (2011)

Music video
- "All The Small Things" on YouTube

"All the Small Things" served as the second single from Irish pop rap duo Jedward's debut studio album, Planet Jedward. The single was released on July 16, 2010. The song performed relatively modestly, peaking at number 21 on the Irish Charts and at number six on the UK Indie Chart.

=== Music video ===
The music video for "All The Small Things" premiered on YouTube on July 15, 2010. The video was filmed in June 2010. The video is inspired by the original video by Blink-182, parodying popular music videos that have been seen worldwide. The videos parodied by Jedward include "SOS" by the Jonas Brothers, "Single Ladies (Put a Ring on It)" by Beyoncé, "Telephone" by Lady Gaga, and "...Baby One More Time" by Britney Spears. The video was given its first television airplay by 4Music on July 16, 2010. Since its premiere, the video has more than 2 million views on YouTube.

=== Charts ===
Chart (2010)	Peak position
Ireland (IRMA)	21
UK Singles (Official Charts)	80
UK Independent (Official Charts)	6
