= Lipstick (Jedward song) =

2011 song by Jedward

Single by Jedward

from the album Victory/Planet Jedward (European version)
- B-side: "Lipstick (Instrumental)"
- Released: 11 February 2011
- Recorded: 2010–2011
- Genre: Pop; electropop; Europop
- Length: 3:52; 2:55 (Radio Edit)
- Label: Universal Music Group
- Songwriters: Dan Priddy, Lars Halvor Jensen, Martin M. Larsson
- Producer: DEEKAY

Jedward singles chronology
"All the Small Things" (2010)	"Lipstick" (2011)	"Bad Behaviour" (2011)

Eurovision Song Contest 2011 entry
- Country: Ireland
- Artist: Jedward
- Language: English
- Composers: Daniel Priddy, Lars Halvor Jensen, Martin Michael Larsson
- Lyricists: Daniel Priddy, Lars Halvor Jensen, Martin Michael Larsson

Finals performance
- Semi-final result: 8th
- Semi-final points: 68
- Final result: 8th
- Final points: 119

Entry chronology
- ◄ "It's for You" (2010)
- "Waterline" (2012) ►

"Lipstick" is a song by Irish pop duo Jedward. It is written by Danish songwriters Lars Jensen and Martin Larsson and British lyricist Dan Priddy. It is Jedward's third single and the first song released from their second studio album, Victory and is best known as Ireland's entry at the Eurovision Song Contest 2011 held in Düsseldorf, Germany.

== Background ==
"Lipstick" was recorded during December 2010 and January 2011 and was selected as Ireland's Eurovision entry on 11 February 2011, following the performance of five songs on the Irish national selection heat. A digital release of the single was made available that same day, with a physical release of the single appearing on 28 February.

The song was performed live in the second half of the second Eurovision semi-final on 12 May. Jedward qualified for the final, which took place on 14 May. They performed in sixth position on the night and finished 8th out of the 25 competing countries, giving Ireland its best result in eleven years. They received 12 points from the United Kingdom, Denmark and Sweden. In Australia's separate TV voting it was voted the most popular song.

The song is notable for being the duo's first original song, as their debut album consisted entirely of cover songs and medleys. The duo performed the song on The Late Late Show on 12 February 2011. They also performed part of the song on Britain's Got Talent 2011 during the live semi-finals.

== Critical reception ==
Nick Levene of Digital Spy gave the song three out of five stars. Coronation Street actress Michelle Keegan claimed the song was 'catchy' and 'fantastic', and tipped the duo to win Eurovision.

== Music videos ==
There are two music videos for "Lipstick". The first was produced by broadcaster RTÉ as part of the official Eurovision entry. It includes animated photos of John and Edward, and footage from the Eurosong performance of "Lipstick". The second video (known as the Paris version) was made by John and Edward themselves while in Paris. It features John and Edward performing the song at various Parisian locations, including the Eiffel Tower.

== Chart performance ==
"Lipstick" debuted at No. 2 in the Irish Singles Chart, on 13 February, only after Lady Gaga's "Born This Way" and debuted at No. 82 in the UK. In the week of their Eurovision performance it rose to No. 40. The song also entered at number four in German Download Chart. After their Eurovision final performance, the song went to No. 1 in Ireland, three months after its release.

== Track listing ==
1. "Lipstick" (Radio Edit) - 2:55
2. "Lipstick" (Full Version) - 3:51
3. "Lipstick" (Instrumental) - 3:51

== Charts ==
Chart (2011)	Peak position
Austria (Ö3 Austria Top 40)	3
Belgium (Ultratip Bubbling Under Flanders)	14
Belgium (Ultratip Bubbling Under Wallonia)	26
Euro Digital Songs (Billboard)	16
Finland (Official Download Chart)	22
Germany (GfK)	12
Ireland (IRMA)	1
Netherlands (Single Top 100)	84
South Korea (GAON)	8
Sweden (Sverigetopplistan)	11
Switzerland (Schweizer Hitparade)	28
UK Singles (OCC)	40

== Release history ==
Country	Release date	Format
Ireland	11 February 2011	Digital download
United Kingdom	11 February 2011	Digital download
Ireland	21 February 2011	CD single
United Kingdom	21 February 2011	CD single
