= Emma Bunton discography =

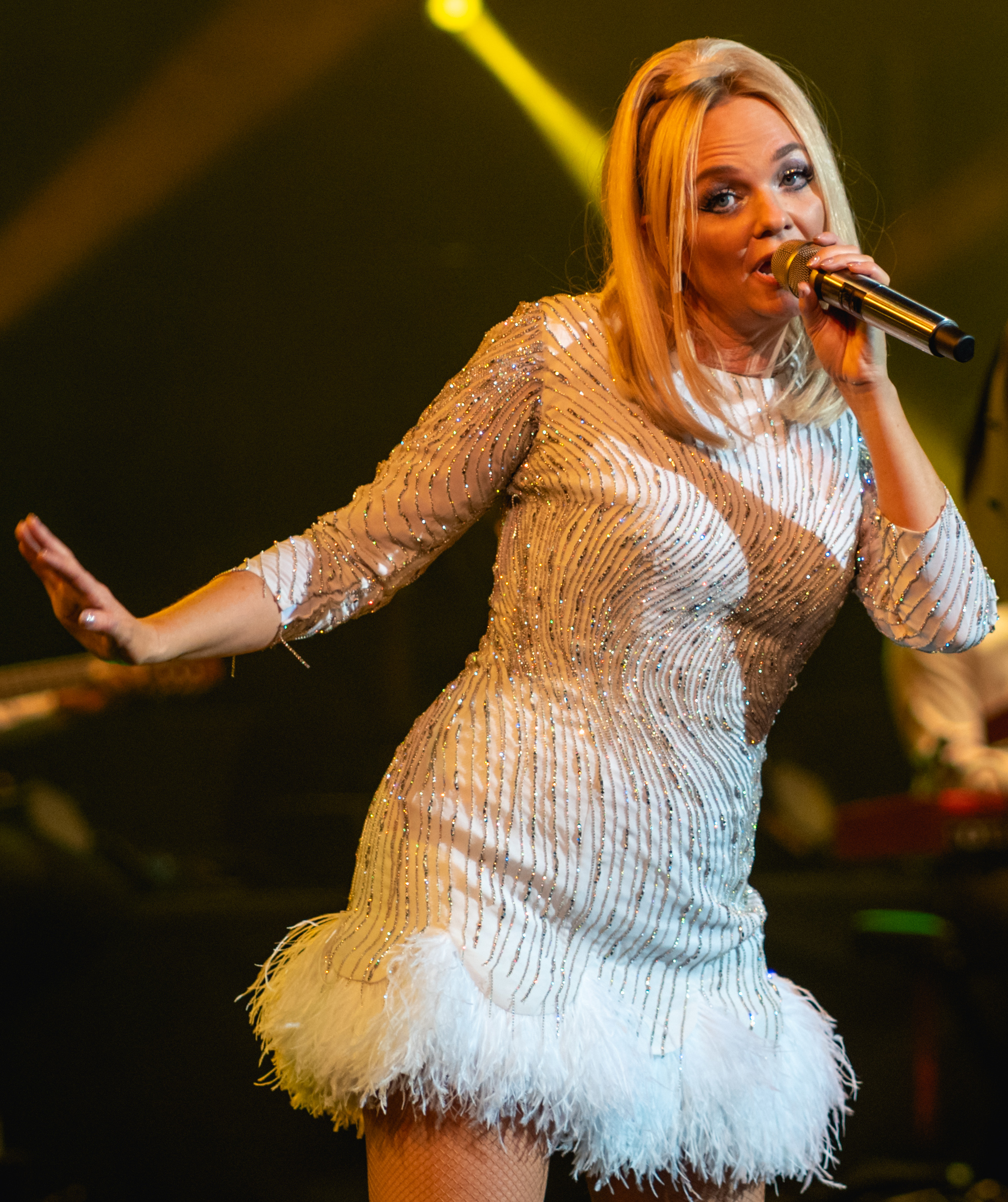
- Bunton in 2019
- Studio albums: 4
- Singles: 16
- Music videos: 13

English singer Emma Bunton has released four studio albums, sixteen singles (including one as a featured artist) and thirteen music videos. Her debut solo album A Girl Like Me was released in the United Kingdom on 16 April 2001 by Virgin Records. The album debuted and peaked at number four on the UK Albums Chart. On 7 September 2001, A Girl Like Me was certified gold by the British Phonographic Industry for sales in excess of 100,000 copies, ultimately becoming the 147th best-selling album in the UK for 2001. The album brought the UK number-one "What Took You So Long?" as well as top-five hits "What I Am" (a cover of a 1988 song by Edie Brickell & New Bohemians) and "Take My Breath Away" and the top twenty single "We're Not Gonna Sleep Tonight". The album sold 127,000 copies in the UK.

Bunton's second album, Free Me, was released in 2003 through 19 Entertainment and Universal Records. Four singles were taken from it: "Free Me", "Maybe", "I'll Be There" and "Crickets Sing for Anamaria". After some success in the American dance charts, the album was sold in North America. The American edition included remixes and a different cover. "Downtown" was released on 13 November 2006 and charted at number three in the UK. Life in Mono was released as Bunton's third album on 4 December 2006, and peaked at number 65 in the UK. The second and final single from the album, "All I Need to Know", was released in February 2007 and charted at 60 in the UK. In November 2012, she released the single, "I Know Him So Well" with fellow Spice Girls member, Melanie C.

Bunton's fourth studio album, My Happy Place, was released in 2019 and was preceded by the singles "Baby Please Don't Stop" and "Too Many Teardrops". Aside from the two preceding singles, the album tracks were all cover versions of Bunton's favourite songs; the singer collaborated with Will Young, Robbie Williams, Josh Kumra and her husband, Jade Jones. In 2024, Bunton released an orchestral version of the Spice Girls' "2 Become 1" as a single.

== Studio albums ==
List of studio albums, with selected chart positions and certifications
Title	Details	Peak chart positions										Certifications	Sales
Title	Details	UK	AUS	AUT	DEN	FRA	GER	IRE	NZ	SCO	US Heat.	Certifications	Sales
A Girl Like Me	Released: 16 April 2001; Formats: cassette, CD, digital download, LP; Label: Virgin	4	86	75	23	79	67	55	21	6	—	BPI: Gold; ARIA: Gold	UK: 127,000; World: 500,000
Free Me	Released: 9 February 2004; Formats: cassette, CD, digital download; Labels: Universal, 19	7	—	—	—	—	—	—	—	9	30	BPI: Gold	UK: 140,000
Life in Mono	Released: 4 December 2006; Formats: CD, digital download; Label: Universal, 19	65	—	—	—	—	—	—	—	69	—		
My Happy Place	Released: 12 April 2019; Formats: cassette, CD, digital download, LP; Label: BMG	11	92	—	—	—	—	88	—	7	7		
"—" denotes releases that did not chart or were not released in that territory.

== Singles ==
=== As lead artist ===
List of singles as lead artist, showing year released, selected chart positions, certifications and originating album
Title	Year	Peak chart positions										Certifications	Album
Title	Year	UK	AUS	GER	IRE	ITA	NL	NZ	SCO	SWE	SWI	Certifications	Album
"What I Am" (with Tin Tin Out)	1999	2	65	81	14	—	94	48	10	52	—	BPI: Silver	Eleven to Fly
"What Took You So Long?"	2001	1	10	36	9	9	56	1	1	14	25	BPI: Silver; ARIA: Gold	A Girl Like Me
"Take My Breath Away"	2001	5	48	—	26	16	—	—	6	—	89		A Girl Like Me
"We're Not Gonna Sleep Tonight"	2001	20	—	—	62	—	—	—	27	—	—		A Girl Like Me
"Free Me"	2003	5	—	—	33	—	—	—	5	—	—		Free Me
"Maybe"	2003	6	56	52	17	20	88	—	4	33	93		Free Me
"I'll Be There"	2004	7	—	—	42	—	—	—	10	—	—		Free Me
"Crickets Sing for Anamaria"	2004	15	—	—	40	—	—	—	18	—	—		Free Me
"Downtown"	2006	3	—	—	36	—	—	—	2	—	—		Life in Mono
"All I Need to Know"	2007	60	—	—	98	—	—	—	24	—	—		Life in Mono
"Baby Please Don't Stop"	2019	—	—	—	—	—	—	—	—	—	—		My Happy Place
"Too Many Teardrops"	2019	—	—	—	—	—	—	—	—	—	—		My Happy Place
"You're All I Need to Get By" (with Jade Jones)	2019	—	—	—	—	—	—	—	—	—	—		My Happy Place
"Coming Home for Christmas"	2019	—	—	—	—	—	—	—	—	—	—		Non-album single
"2 Become 1"	2024	— (Note: "2 Become 1" did not enter the UK Singles Chart, but debuted and peaked at number 56 on the UK Singles Sales Chart on 27 December 2024.)	—	—	—	—	—	—	—	—	—		Non-album single
"—" denotes releases that did not chart or were not released in that territory.

=== As featured artist ===
List of singles as featured artist, showing year released, selected chart positions and originating album
Title	Year	Peak chart positions		Album
Title	Year	UK	UK Indie	Album
"I Know Him So Well" (Melanie C featuring Emma Bunton)	2012	153	14	Stages

=== Promotional singles ===
List of promotional singles, showing year released and originating album
Title	Year	Album
"A World Without You"	2001	A Girl Like Me
"A Girl Like Me"	2002	A Girl Like Me

== Other charted songs ==
List of other charted songs, showing year released, selected chart positions and originating album
Title	Year	Peak	Album
Title	Year	UK	Album
"Something Tells Me"	2006	119	Life in Mono
"Perhaps, Perhaps, Perhaps"	2006	122	Life in Mono

== Guest appearances ==
List of guest appearances, showing year released, collaborated artists and originating album
Title	Year	Collaborated artist(s)	Album
"Where Did Our Love Go?"	1998	None	Live at Wembley Stadium
"Sophisticated Lady"	1999	Melanie B	"Word Up" (b-side)
"(Hey You) Free Up Your Mind"	1999	—N/a	Pokémon: The First Movie – Music from and Inspired by the Motion Picture
"Don't Go Breaking My Heart"	1999	Ronan Keating	Wicked Women
"Hotter"	2000	Melanie B	Hot
"I Don't Know"	2001	Damage	Since You've Been Gone
"Good Vibrations"	2002	Brian Wilson, Cliff Richard, Atomic Kitten	Party at the Palace
"Baby Love"	2002	—N/a	Party at the Palace
"Sometimes"	2003	Chicken Shed	The Chicken Shed Album
"2 Become 1"	2003	—N/a	Pepsi Silver Clef Concert

== Music videos ==
List of music videos, showing year released and director
Title	Year	Director(s)
"What I Am" (with Tin Tin Out)	1999	Greg Masuak
"What Took You So Long?"	2001	Greg Masuak
"Take My Breath Away"	2001	Greg Masuak
"We're Not Gonna Sleep Tonight"	2001	Phil Griffin
"Free Me"	2003	Tim Royes
"Maybe"	2003	Harvey & Carolyn
"I'll Be There"	2004	Giuseppe Capotondi
"Crickets Sing for Anamaria"	2004	Harvey & Carolyn
"Downtown"	2006	Harvey & Carolyn
"All I Need to Know"	2007	Max & Dania
"Baby Please Don't Stop"	2019	Marc Klasfeld
"You're All I Need to Get By"	2019	Max & Dania
2 Become 1	2024	Howard Greenhalgh

== Writing credits ==
List of songs for other artists, with Bunton receiving writing credits, showing year released, collaborated artist and originating album
Title	Year	Artist	Album
"To Have to Let Go"	2002	Nikki Webster	Bliss
"One Thing I Know"	2003	S Club 8	Sundown
