= List of Emma Bunton concert tours =

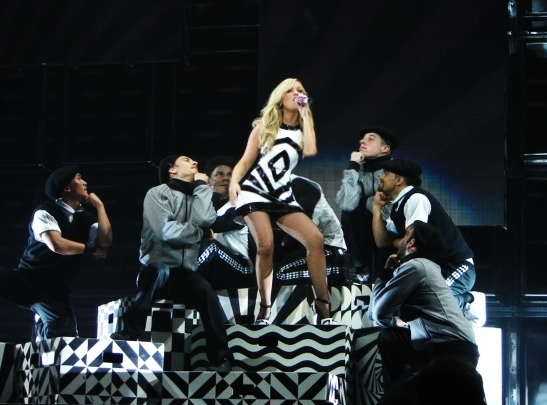
Bunton performing "Maybe" in 2007

Emma Bunton's debut solo album, A Girl Like Me, was released in the United Kingdom on 16 April 2001 by Virgin Records. The album debuted and peaked at No. 4 on the UK Albums Chart. It was certified gold by the British Phonographic Industry for sales in excess of 100,000 copies, ultimately becoming the 147th best-selling album in the UK for 2001. The album brought the UK and New Zealand No. 1 single "What Took You So Long?" as well as top five hits "What I Am" and "Take My Breath Away" and the top 20 hit "We're Not Gonna Sleep Tonight". Bunton's second album, Free Me, was released in 2004 through 19 Entertainment/Universal Records. Four singles were taken from it: "Free Me", "Maybe", "I'll Be There" and "Crickets Sing for Anamaria". In 2006 she released her third album, Life in Mono.

== A Girl Like Me promotional tour ==
A Girl Like Me promotional tour
- Tour by Emma Bunton
- Associated album: A Girl Like Me
- Start date: 24 March 2001
- End date: 23 November 2001
- Legs: 1
- No. of shows: 6 total

Emma Bunton concert chronology
- A Girl Like Me promotional tour (2001); Free Me promotional tour (2004)

These were the promotional appearances by Bunton in support of her debut album. The performances served to promote her first solo studio album A Girl Like Me, starting on 24 March and ending on 23 November 2001.

=== Background ===
Bunton's debut solo album, A Girl Like Me, released in the United Kingdom on 16 April 2001 by Virgin Records. The album debuted and peaked at number four on the UK Albums Chart, with 21,500 copies sold in its first week. Although initial success was promising, A Girl Like Me fell down the chart quickly. However, singles "What Took You So Long?", "Take My Breath Away", and "We're Not Gonna Sleep Tonight" helped the album stay on the UK Albums Chart for several weeks. On 7 September 2001, A Girl Like Me was certified gold by the British Phonographic Industry for sales in excess of 100,000 copies, ultimately becoming the 147th best-selling album in the UK for 2001. The album brought the UK number-one "What Took You So Long?" as well as top five hits "What I Am" (a cover of a 1988 song by Edie Brickell & New Bohemians) and "Take My Breath Away" and the top 20 hit "We're Not Gonna Sleep Tonight". The album sold 125,000 copies in the UK. Disappointing sales led to Bunton's leaving Virgin in 2002. Bunton performed at Party at the Palace, an event that was held at Buckingham Palace Garden on 3 June 2002 in commemoration of the Golden Jubilee of Elizabeth II. Her solo performance at the event was a cover of The Supremes' 1964 hit "Baby Love".

=== Broadcasts and recordings ===
The MCM Café concert was broadcast on MTV France on 15 October 2001.

=== Live performance dates ===
Date	City	Country	Venue
Europe
24 March 2001	London	United Kingdom	London Astoria
26 April 2001	Copenhagen	Denmark	The Voice Hall
31 July 2001	Milan	Italy	Italian Music Festival
3 October 2001	Paris	France	MCM Café
20 October 2001	London	United Kingdom	C3 London
Oceania
23 November 2001	Sydney	Australia	Pitt Street

== Free Me promotional tour ==
Free Me promotional tour
- Tour by Emma Bunton
- Associated album: Free Me
- Start date: 10 May 2004
- End date: 4 September 2004
- Legs: 1
- No. of shows: 8 total

Emma Bunton concert chronology
- A Girl Like Me promotional tour (2001); Free Me promotional tour (2004)

These were the promotional performances by Bunton to promote the album Free Me. They started on 10 May and ended on 4 September 2004.

=== Background ===
Bunton's second album, Free Me, was released in 2003 through 19 Entertainment/Universal Records. The album was largely produced by Mike Peden and Yak Bondy. Other contributions on the album courtesy of Cathy Dennis, Henry Binns and Puerto Rican singer Luis Fonsi. It spent over twelve weeks inside the UK Albums Chart, peaking at number seven and selling over 141,712 copies, earning gold award status. The album was widely acclaimed by critics as being the "one of best solo Spice records ever" due to its catchy and fun use of sounds from the Motown and the 1960s era. The lead single, "Free Me", sold well in the UK, peaking at number five on the UK Singles Chart. "Maybe" was released as the second single in the autumn of 2003, and also gained extensive airplay throughout the UK, peaking at number six, one position lower than its predecessor. In the spring of 2004, the album and its third single, "I'll Be There", were released. The single, like its two predecessors, performed well on the charts, peaking at number seven. Later in the year, the fourth single, "Crickets Sing for Anamaria", was released. Despite its harder beat and grittier sound, by now the impact of Free Me was beginning to wear off, and the song only came in at number 15 on the UK Singles Chart, totalling 25,000 copies, and becoming Bunton's lowest-selling single. In the United States, both "Free Me" and "Maybe" were dance club regulars, reaching numbers four and six on the US Billboard Hot Dance Club Play respectively.

=== Performance dates ===
Date	City	Country	Venue
Europe
10 May 2004	London	United Kingdom	Hyde Park
20 May 2004	London	United Kingdom	Southern FM Hall
29 May 2004	London	United Kingdom	London Astoria
3 June 2004	London	United Kingdom	The Mall
6 June 2004	Great Yarmouth	United Kingdom	Weston-super-Mare
20 June 2004	Milton Keynes	United Kingdom	The National Bowl
20 July 2004	Milan	Italy	Verona Arena
4 September 2004	Lich	Germany	Hit Radio FFH
