= Free Me =

Free Me may refer to:

- Free Me (album), by Emma Bunton, 2004
  - "Free Me" (Emma Bunton song), 2003
- "Free Me" (Cast song), 1997
- "Free Me" (Joss Stone song), 2009
- "Free Me" (Roger Daltrey song), 1980
- "Free Me" (Sia song), 2017
- "Free Me", a song by Billy Joe Royal from Out of the Shadows, 1990
- "Free Me", a song by Debbie Gibson from Body, Mind, Soul, 1993
- "Free Me", a song by Foo Fighters from In Your Honor, 2005
- "Free Me", a song by Jenny Berggren from My Story, 2010
- "Free Me", a song by Johnny Preston, 1961
- "Free Me", a song by Otis Redding from Love Man, 1969
- "Free Me", a song by Uriah Heep from Innocent Victim, 1977
