= Life in Mono (album) =

2006 album by Emma Bunton

Studio album by Emma Bunton
- Released: 4 December 2006
- Length: 37:09
- Label: 19; Universal
- Producer: Yak Bondy; Gary Clark; Simon Franglen; Eric Pressly

Emma Bunton chronology
Free Me (2004)	Life in Mono (2006)	My Happy Place (2019)

Singles from Life in Mono
- 1. "Downtown" Released: 13 November 2006; 2. "All I Need to Know" Released: 12 February 2007

Life in Mono is the third studio album by English singer Emma Bunton. It was released on 4 December 2006 through 19 Recordings. A stylistic continuation of her previous record, Free Me, the record deepens Bunton's exploration of 1960s-inspired pop, with a more pronounced nod to the polished sound of French pop from the era. Bunton co-wrote most of the material, with the majority of the album produced by Simon Franglen. Yak Bondy, Gary Clark, and Eric Pressly also contributed.

The album received mixed reviews, with critics applauding Bunton's vocals and its 1960s-inspired sound, though many considered the songs bland, repetitive, or lacking memorable hooks. Commercially, Life in Mono fell short of the success of her first two solo albums, A Girl Like Me (2001) and Free Me (2004), becoming her first album to miss the UK top 10, debuting and peaking at number 65 on the UK Albums Chart and reaching number 69 on the Scottish Albums Chart.

Life in Mono spawned two singles. The first, a cover of Petula Clark's "Downtown," was released on 13 November 2006 as the official 2006 BBC Children in Need charity single and reached number three on the UK Singles Chart. The follow-up, "All I Need to Know," peaked at number 60. With Bunton expecting her first child in August 2007, promotion for the album was cut short. Life in Mono would remain her last studio album until the release of My Happy Place in 2019.

== Background ==
In February 2004, Bunton released her second studio album, Free Me, under 19 Recordings after leaving Virgin Records. The album marked a major stylistic shift, embracing 1960s-inspired sounds like bossa nova, Motown, and French pop, in contrast to the pop sound that defined her work on her solo debut. Receiving generally positive reviews, it peaked at number 7 on the UK Albums Chart and number 9 on the Scottish Albums Chart, and was certified Gold by the British Phonographic Industry (BPI). In doing so, it surpassed the domestic sales of her solo debut, A Girl Like Me (2001). Free Me's first three singles, the title track, "Maybe", and "I'll Be There", all reached the top ten in the United Kingdom.

Work on her third studio album, Life in Mono, began in winter 2004, with Bunton spending the following year writing and developing the material. During this period, she moved house and took time away from the spotlight to focus on her family, particularly her nieces and nephews, an experience she later cited as creatively inspiring. She wrote all of the original material on the album herself, with the exception of its cover versions, describing the project as her most honest and personal work to date. As with Free Me, Life in Mono was inspired by 1960s sounds such as motown, bossa nova and pop. The album's title track is a cover version of the hit "Life in Mono" by 1990s trip hop band Mono, best known through its usage in the 1998 film Great Expectations.

== Promotion ==
The album's lead single was a cover of Petula Clark's 1964 hit "Downtown", released on 13 November 2006. It served as the official 2006 BBC Children in Need charity single and peaked at number three on the UK Singles Chart, marking Bunton's seventh solo top ten hit in the UK. The album's second single, "All I Need to Know", was released on 12 February 2007 and reached number 60 on the UK Singles Chart, becoming her lowest-charting single yet. Promotion for the album was limited due to Bunton's pregnancy, resulting in the cancellation of further promotional activities.

== Critical reception ==
Professional ratings
Review scores
Source	Rating
AllMusic	2/5 stars
Digital Spy	3/5 stars
Evening Standard	1/5 stars
The Guardian	3/5 stars
musicOMH	3/5 stars
The Observer	3/5 stars
Yahoo! Music UK	7/10 stars

Reviews of Life in Mono were mixed to moderately positive, with several critics praising its style but questioning its substance. The Guardian's Alex Macpherson noted that Life in Mono "continues in the same vein" as previous album Free Me, "with breezy Motown rhythms and tastefully swooping strings offsetting Bunton's candyfloss-light vocals exquisitely. Though she has largely eschewed the playful pastiche that made Free Me such a triumph in favour of a more languid subtlety, it's still a sound no one else in British pop is pursuing. And it's difficult to think of anyone who could pull it off more delightfully than Bunton does [...] There's an undercurrent of vague wistfulness that never quite leaves her voice, lending it emotional clout beyond its technical limitations." Jaime Gill from Yahoo! Music UK called the album "a rather lovely record and quite possibly the last Spice-related release which anyone in the world barring immediate family members even vaguely cares about - she chose wisely. Like its charming predecessor Free Me, Life in Mono comes wrapped-up in a vogueish '60s French pop gleam, all sugary harmonies, luscious strings and crafty Bacharach style arrangements.

MSN remarked that "while unlikely to be a chart topper, nevertheless Life In Mono is a charming record and reason enough for Emma to delay that pension-boosting Spice Girls reunion any time soon." Digital Spy's Miriam Zendle opined that "there are a whole number of problems with this album, though Emma Bunton's voice is not one of them. It's utterly bland and very repetitive in terms of content. It seems to be geared very much towards the Christmas market and as such is incredibly cheesy and soft-focus. It's hard to find any tracks that really stand out, as they pretty much all sound exactly the same. Bunton's gentle, lovely vocals are the only thing that keeps the album from sinking into forgettability, but at the end of the day, it's just not enough." AllMusic editor Sharon Mawer called it "a safe album, light and fluffy with almost no substance". Talia Kraines from BBC Music felt that "there's little on this album that could see Emma bothering [another top 5 hit]. That's not to say little ol' Baby Spice hasn't tried [...] but while she may be continuing the Sixties vibe of Free Me, there's nothing that even flirts with the beehive razzamatazz of "Maybe"."

== Chart performance ==
Life in Mono was Bunton's first not to reach the UK top 10. It debuted on the UK Albums Chart at number 65 on 10 December 2006, slipped to number 75 in its second week, and exited the chart shortly thereafter. The album would be Bunton's last for over a decade, until the release of My Happy Place in 2019, during which time she shifted her focus toward other career ventures and family life. Reflecting in 2019 on Life in Mono's commercial disappointment, Bunton described it as "a strange period," adding that she tried not to dwell on sales performance. She emphasized that making an album is a creative process and that while awareness of the business side matters, she did not want it to overshadow or influence the music itself.

== Track listing ==
Life in Mono track listing
No.	Title	Writer(s)	Producer(s)	Length
1.	"All I Need to Know"	Emma Bunton; Jamie Hartman	Simon Franglen	4:18
2.	"Life in Mono"	John Barry; Martin Virgo	Franglen	3:48
3.	"Mischievous"	Bunton; Cathy Dennis; Greg Kurstin	Franglen	3:41
4.	"Perfect Strangers"	Bunton; Gary Clark; Pam Sheyne	Franglen	3:31
5.	"He Loves Me Not"	Bunton; Yak Bondy	Franglen	3:28
6.	"I Wasn't Looking (When I Found Love)"	Bunton; Pascal Gabriel; Hannah Robinson	Franglen	3:31
7.	"Take Me to Another Town"	Clark; Keely Hawkes; Eric Pressly	Clark; Pressly	4:08
8.	"Undressing You"	Tim Kellett; Kate Elsworth	Franglen	3:21
9.	"I'm Not Crying Over Yesterdays"	Bunton; Blair MacKichan; Justin Gray	Franglen	3:23
10.	"All That You'll Be"	Bunton; Peter Gordeno; Chris Porter	Franglen	4:00
Total length:				37:09

Bonus tracks
No.	Title	Writer(s)	Producer(s)	Length
11.	"Downtown"	Tony Hatch	Franglen	3:24
12.	"Something Tells Me (Something's Going to Happen)"	Roger Cook; Roger Greenaway	Bondy	3:41
13.	"Perhaps, Perhaps, Perhaps"	Osvaldo Farrés; Joe Davis	Franglen	2:30
14.	"Por Favor"	Noel Sherman; Joe Sherman	Bondy	2:35
Total length:				49:17

== Charts ==
Weekly chart performance for Life in Mono
Chart (2006)	Peak position
Scottish Albums (OCC)	69
UK Albums (OCC)	65
