= Emma Goes to Bollywood =

- Genre: Documentary
- Directed by: Louis Theroux
- Starring: Emma Bunton; Sameera Reddy
- Country of origin: United Kingdom
- Original language: English

Production
- Running time: 60 minutes
- Production company: BBC Films

Original release
- Network: BBC Two
- Release: 25 June 2005

Emma Goes to Bollywood is a 2005 British documentary film produced and broadcast by BBC Two. It was directed by Louis Theroux and released on 12 June 2005. It stars Emma Bunton on her travel to Bollywood.

== Summary ==
Emma Bunton goes to Mumbai, India, where she will record two films – Pyaar Mein Twist and Chocolate. For four weeks, Bunton assimilates into Indian culture and she was interviewed by several Asia's radios and TV to promote her debut in Bollywood. Meanwhile, the Indian actress Sameera Reddy goes to United Kingdom to record the medical drama series Casualty.

== Cast ==
- Emma Bunton
- Sameera Reddy

== Production ==
In 2005 Bunton signed with the BBC to record a documentary in India, where he would know the culture and would be part of some productions in Bollywood. Three films were offered to her and she chose Pyaar Mein Twist to be part of the cast. Then she was also invited to star in Chocolate.
