= Free Me (album) =

2004 album by Emma Bunton

Studio album by Emma Bunton
- Released: 9 February 2004
- Recorded: 2002–2003
- Studios: Sarm West (London) (Note: Tracks 1–3 and 6); Olympic (London) (Note: Track 9)
- Genre: Pop
- Length: 45:30
- Label: 19
- Producers: Yak Bondy; Boo Dan Productions; Cathy Dennis; Simon Ellis; Ray "Madman" Hedges; Tim Lever; Pete Lewinson; Steve Lewinson; Mike Peden; Mike Percy; Fabien Waltmann; João Araújo

Emma Bunton chronology
A Girl Like Me (2001)	Free Me (2004)	Life in Mono (2006)

Alternative cover
- US and Canadian cover

Singles from Free Me
- 1. "Free Me" Released: 26 May 2003; 2. "Maybe" Released: 13 October 2003; 3. "I'll Be There" Released: 26 January 2004; 4. "Crickets Sing for Anamaria" Released: 31 May 2004

Free Me is the second studio album by English singer Emma Bunton. It was released on 9 February 2004 by 19 Recordings. Her debut with the label, following her departure from Virgin Records, the album marked a significant musical shift for Bunton, drawing heavily on 1960s influences such as bossa nova, Motown, and French pop. The album was primarily produced by Mike Peden and Yak Bondy, with additional contributions from Cathy Dennis, Henry Binns, and Puerto Rican singer Luis Fonsi.

The album received generally positive reviews, with critics praising its polished production, 1960s-inspired retro influences, and Bunton's sweet, nuanced vocals, though some noted it was pleasant but not groundbreaking. It performed strongly in the United Kingdom, peaking at number 7 on the UK Albums Chart and number 9 on the Scottish Albums Chart, earning a Gold certification from the British Phonographic Industry (BPI), although if failed to chart or sell noticeably elsewhere.

Free Me produced four singles, including the title track, "Maybe", and "I'll Be There", all of which reached the top ten in the United Kingdom. Serving as the album's international lead single, "Maybe," also charted within the top 20 in Italy, Ireland, and the Netherlands. In further support of the album, Bunton embarked on the Free Me Tour from May to September 2004. She continued to draw on the album's 1960s pop influences on her next release, Life in Mono, in December 2006.

== Background ==
In 2001, Bunton released her solo debut album A Girl Like Me through Virgin Records. It spent over 12 weeks inside the UK Albums Chart, peaking at number four and earning a gold certification by the British Phonographic Industry (BPI). It also produced her only solo chart-topper "What Took You So Long?" and the top-five single "Take My Breath Away". By 2002, Bunton realized that Virgin Records, who had launched both the Spice Girls and her solo career, was losing interest in her future. Despite the number-one success of "What Took You So Long?", she left the label, explaining: "They [Virgin] came to me and said, 'Let's do a demo thing for the second album.' [but] I actually walked away [...] I want to take this where I know people are going to be right behind me and work as hard as I do." After parting ways with Virgin, she faced a music industry increasingly focused on younger, TV-created stars, yet Simon Fuller soon offered her a new record deal with 19 Recordings.

== Composition ==
A departure from the pop style she had established with the Spice Girls and developed on A Girl like Me, Free Me marked a significant musical shift for Bunton, drawing heavily on 1960s influences such as bossa nova, Motown, and French pop. The album was primarily produced by Mike Peden and Yak Bondy, with additional contributions from Cathy Dennis, Henry Binns, and Puerto Rican singer Luis Fonsi. Bunton described the album's inspiration: "I've been listening to Motown since I was about five… I always talk about the fact I love '60s and Motown, so I thought I'd take elements of it, bits of it, and put it into my album, so that's exactly what I did." Most of the songs, she explained, began as simple ideas jotted in a notebook beside her bed: "Usually when I'm having a dream, I'll wake up and write something down, then look at it again and think, 'God, what was I dreaming about?'"

== Singles ==
The album's title track was released as its first single in May 2003. The song immediately picked up airplay, peaking at number five on the UK Singles Chart. "Maybe" was released as the second single in October 2003, and also gained extensive airplay throughout the United Kingdom, peaking at number six. In January 2004, "I'll Be There" was released as the third single from the album. Like its two predecessors, it performed well on the charts, peaking at number seven on the UK chart. Later in the year, in May, "Crickets Sing for Anamaria", was released as the fourth single. The song peaked at number 15 on the UK Singles Chart. In the United States, both "Free Me" and "Maybe" were dance club regulars, reaching numbers four and six on the Billboard Hot Dance Club Play chart, respectively.

== Critical reception ==
Professional ratings
Review scores
Source	Rating
AllMusic	4.5/5 stars
Blender	3/5 stars
The Guardian	3/5 stars
IGN	8/10
Rolling Stone	3/5 stars
Slant Magazine	2.5/5 stars
USA Today	2.5/4 stars

Free Me received generally positive reviews, with critics praising its retro influences and polished production. Stephen Thomas Erlewine of AllMusic called it the best Spice Girl-related solo album, noting that Bunton's "small, sweet voice" had gained presence, giving the album "not just a face, but a fetching persona that's hard to resist". Rolling Stone's Barry Walters described the album as "easy-listening fluff so lusciously lush and lovingly retro that it's nearly radical," highlighting Bunton's "sweetly nuanced" voice. BBC Music said the album is "light and frothy, like a good cappuccino, but this time it's with the sugar taken out". Lynsey Hanley of The Daily Telegraph called Bunton's musical shift "a brave move" and praised her "lilting vocals" that suit the album's less aggressive style.

Dorian Lynskey of The Guardian described Free Me as "classy retro pop" with "easy listening strings and Spanish guitars". Q magazine wrote that the album "has charm, grace and it's fun," while Marie Claire noted it "mixes up bossa nova with James Bond soundtrack" influences and that Bunton "resembles a seductive Brigitte Bardot." Elysa Gardner of USA Today noted Bunton adopts a retro 1960s style with "breezy orchestrations" and "playful arrangements." While her vocals are "personable" and "less processed" than many contemporary singers, they lack the distinctive appeal of classic '60s girl groups. Less impressed, Azeem Ahmad of musicOMH described the album as pleasant and polished but not groundbreaking, retaining similarities to the softer Spice Girls style and not fully reflecting Bunton's musical maturity.

== Commercial performance ==
Free Me performed strongly in the United Kingdom, peaking at number 7 on the UK Albums Chart and number 9 on the Scottish Albums Chart, marking Bunton's second top-ten album in both territories. In May 2004, the British Phonographic Industry (BPI) awarded the album a Gold certification for shipments exceeding 100,000 units, and by 2006 it had sold 140,000 copies in the UK, surpassing the sales of her previous album, A Girl like Me, making her the only Spice Girl whose second solo album sold more than their first. In the United States, the album reached number 30 on Billboard's Heatseekers Albums chart, with total sales of around 17,000 copies.

== Track listing ==
Free Me track listing
No.	Title	Writer(s)	Producer(s)	Length
1.	"Free Me"	Emma Bunton; Hélène Muddiman; Mike Peden	Peden	4:28
2.	"Maybe"	Bunton; Yak Bondy	Peden	3:43
3.	"I'll Be There"	Bunton; Muddiman; Peden	Peden	3:23
4.	"Tomorrow"	Bunton; Bondy	Bondy	3:55
5.	"Breathing"	Bunton; Henry Binns; Yoyo Olugbo	Boo Dan Productions	4:00
6.	"Crickets Sing for Anamaria"	Marcos Valle; Ray Gilbert	Peden	2:46
7.	"No Sign of Life"	Bunton; Simon Ellis; Steve Lee	Ellis	3:38
8.	"Who the Hell Are You"	Bunton; Ray Hedges; Nigel Butler	Ray "Madman" Hedges	3:18
9.	"Lay Your Love on Me"	Bunton; Cathy Dennis	Dennis; Fabien Waltmann	3:23
10.	"Amazing" (featuring Luis Fonsi)	Bunton; Peden; Muddiman; Nina Marander	Peden	4:06
11.	"You Are"	Bunton; Tim Lever; Mike Percy	Lever; Percy	3:46
12.	"Something So Beautiful"	Bunton; Steve Lewinson; Pete Lewinson	S. Lewinson; P. Lewinson; Lipso Facto^{[a]}	3:46
Total length:				45:30

US edition bonus tracks
No.	Title	Writer(s)	Producer(s)	Length
13.	"Free Me" (Dr. Octavo Seduction Remix)	Bunton; Muddiman; Peden	Peden; Dr. Octavo^{[a]}^{[b]}	3:38
14.	"Free Me" (Full Intention Freed Up Remix)	Bunton; Muddiman; Peden	Peden; Michael Gray^{[b]}; Jon Pearn^{[b]}	4:01

=== Notes ===
- ^{^[a]} signifies an additional producer
- ^{^[b]} signifies a remixer

== Personnel ==
Credits adapted from the liner notes of Free Me.

=== Musicians ===
- Emma Bunton – lead vocals (all tracks); backing vocals (track 9)
- Charlie Russell – programming (tracks 1–3, 6); live drums (tracks 1–3); drums, live programming (track 10)
- Mike Peden – bass (tracks 1, 10); percussion (track 2); keyboards (tracks 3, 6)
- Graham Kearns – guitars (tracks 1, 2, 9, 10); bass guitar (track 6)
- Helene Muddiman – keyboards (track 1); backing vocals (tracks 1, 3)
- Martin Hayles – keyboards (tracks 1, 3)
- Nick Ingman – orchestra arrangement, orchestra conducting (tracks 1–4, 7, 10)
- Gavyn Wright – orchestra leader (tracks 1, 3, 7)
- Paul Turner – bass (track 2); guitar (track 6)
- Pete Gordeno – keyboards (tracks 2, 6); piano (tracks 2, 10)
- Yak Bondy – keyboards (track 4)
- Ralph Salmins – drums (track 4)
- Frank Ricotti – percussion (track 4); vibes (track 6)
- Paul Clarvis – percussion (track 4)
- Steve Pearce – bass (track 4)
- Hugh Burns – guitar (track 4)
- John Parricelli – guitar (track 4)
- Friðrik Karlsson – guitar (track 4)
- Richard Studt – orchestra leader (track 4)
- Allan Simpson – guitar (track 5)
- Pete Trotman – bass guitar (track 5)
- Simon Clarke – flute (track 5)
- Siemy Di – percussion (track 5)
- Alastair Gavin – string arrangement (track 5)
- Danny Cummings – percussion (track 6)
- Phil Todd – flute (track 6)
- Simon Ellis – all keyboards, programming (track 7)
- Paul Gendler – guitar (track 7)
- John Thompson – bass guitar (track 7)
- Brett Morgan – drums (track 7)
- Lisa Daniels – backing vocals (track 7)
- Ray "Madman" Hedges – arrangement (track 8)
- Nigel Butler – arrangement (track 8)
- Fabien Waltmann – programming, guitars (track 9)
- Nicky Brown – piano, Rhodes (track 9)
- Cathy Dennis – backing vocals (track 9)
- Luis Fonsi – vocals (track 10)
- Henrik Linnemann – flute (track 11)
- Tim Lever – all other instruments (track 11)
- Mike Percy – all other instruments (track 11)
- Toni Leo – backing vocals (track 11)
- Alex Clarke – additional programming (track 12)
- Steve Lewinson – all instruments (except piano and additional guitar), programming (track 12)
- Pete Lewinson – all instruments (except piano and additional guitar), programming (track 12)
- Paul "Harry" Harris – piano (track 12)
- Ian Lewinson – additional guitar (track 12)
- The London Session Orchestra – orchestra (track 12)
- Simon Hale – orchestra arrangement, orchestra conducting (track 12)

=== Technical ===
- Mike Peden – production (tracks 1–3, 6, 10); mixing (tracks 3, 10)
- Mark "Spike" Stent – mixing (tracks 1, 2)
- Martin Hayles – recording (tracks 1–3, 6); engineering (track 10)
- Isobel Griffiths Ltd. – orchestra contractor (tracks 1–4, 7, 10)
- Richard Dowling – mastering
- Yak Bondy – production (track 4)
- Dan Frampton – mixing (tracks 4, 7)
- Steve Price – recording engineering (track 4)
- César Gimeno – engineering assistance (track 4)
- Boo Dan Productions – production, mixing (track 5)
- Simon Ellis – production (track 7)
- Tony Taverner – engineering (track 7)
- Jim Brumby – Pro Tools (track 7)
- Ray "Madman" Hedges – production, mixing (track 8)
- Nigel Butler – mixing (track 8)
- Mark Emmitt – mixing (track 8)
- Cathy Dennis – production (track 9)
- Fabien Waltmann – production, additional recording (track 9)
- Steve Fitzmaurice – mixing (track 9)
- Richard Wilkinson – mixing assistance (track 9)
- Keith Uddin – recording (track 9)
- Phil Bodger – mixing (track 10)
- Tim Lever – production (track 11)
- Mike Percy – production (track 11)
- Dan Panton – engineering assistance (track 11)
- Steve Lewinson – production (track 12)
- Pete Lewinson – production (track 12)
- Lipso Facto – additional production (track 12)
- The Asian Sensation – mixing (track 12)

=== Artwork ===
- Yacht Associates – art direction
- Darren S. Feist – photography
- Roger Dean – architectural photography
- Core Digital – scanning, retouching

== Charts ==
=== Weekly charts ===
Weekly chart performance for Free Me
Chart (2004–2005)	Peak position
Scottish Albums (Official Charts)	9
UK Albums (Official Charts)	7
US Heatseekers Albums (Billboard)	30

=== Year-end charts ===
Year-end chart performance for Free Me
Chart (2004)	Position
UK Albums (OCC)	134

== Certifications and sales ==
Certifications and sales for Free Me
Region	Certification	Certified units/sales
United Kingdom (BPI)	Gold	140,000
United States	—	17,000
^{^} Shipments figures based on certification alone.

== Release history ==
Release history for Free Me
Region	Date	Label
United Kingdom	9 February 2004	19
Australia	19 July 2004	Universal
Brazil	20 September 2004	Universal
Germany	21 January 2005	Universal
United States	25 January 2005	19
