= Samba '68 =

Studio album by Marcos Valle
- Released: March 1968
- Recorded: October–November 1967
- Genre: Bossa nova, Brazilian popular music
- Length: 26:55
- Label: Verve VS-5053
- Producer: Bob Morgan, Ray Gilbert

Marcos Valle chronology
Viola Enluarada (1968)	Samba '68 (1968)	Mustang Côr De Sangue (1969)

Samba '68 is a 1968 album by Marcos Valle, arranged by Eumir Deodato.

== Reception ==
Professional ratings
Review scores
Source	Rating
Allmusic	4.5/5 stars

Billboard magazine reviewed the album in their March 23, 1968 issue and wrote that the album was a "topnotch album of [Valle's] contemporary samba music".

John Bush reviewed the reissue of the album for Allmusic and wrote that the album was "a vibrant set of Brazilian pop, indebted to bossa nova and samba but undeniably Americanized for a domestic audience. The result is a joyous album throughout that wears its dated sound quite well". Bush also described the vocal harmonies of Anamaria Valle as providing a "beautiful counterpoint" to Valle's voice and concluded that the album was "one of the best Brazilian crossovers of the 1960s".

== Track listing ==
1. "The Answer" (Ray Gilbert, Marcos Valle, Paulo Sérgio Valle) – 2:45
2. "Crickets Sing for Anamaria" (Gilbert, M. Valle, P. S. Valle) – 2:09
3. "So Nice (Summer Samba)" (Norman Gimbel, M. Valle) – 2:30
4. "Chup, Chup, I Got Away" (Gilbert, M. Valle, P. S. Valle) – 2:18
5. "If You Went Away" (Gilbert, M. Valle) – 2:55
6. "Pepino Beach" (Gilbert, M. Valle) – 1:53
7. "She Told Me, She Told Me" (Gilbert, M. Valle, P. S. Valle) – 2:44
8. "It's Time to Sing" (Gilbert, M. Valle, P. S. Valle) – 2:54
9. "Batucada" (Gilbert, M. Valle, P. S. Valle) – 2:05
10. "The Face I Love" (Gilbert, Carlos Pingarilho, M. Valle, P. S. Valle) – 1:58
11. "Safely in Your Arms" (Gilbert, Pingarilho, M. Valle) – 3:09

== Personnel ==
- Marcos Valle – guitar, vocals
- Anamaria Valle – vocals
- Deodato – arranger
- Claudio Slon – drums
- Ray Gilbert – producer

Production

- Acy Lehman – cover design, design
- Suzanne White – design coordinator
- Sung Lee – design
- Deborah Hay – editing
- Frank Laico – engineer
- Val Valentin – engineering director
- Richard Seidel – executive producer
- Sidney Eden, Merv Griffin – liner notes
- Kevin Reeves – mastering, mixing
- Bob Morgan – producer
- Tom Greenwood, Carlos Kase – production assistant
- Terri Tierney – production coordination
- Bryan Koniarz, Jerry Rappaport – reissue coordination
- Ben Young – research, restoration
