= Crickets Sing for Anamaria =

Song written by Marcos Valle

Song by Marcos Valle

from the album Samba '68
- Released: 1968
- Genre: Bossa nova
- Length: 2:08
- Label: Verve
- Songwriters: Marcos Valle; Ray Gilbert
- Producers: Bob Morgan; Ray Gilbert

"Crickets Sing for Anamaria" is the English-language version of "Os Grilos" ("The Crickets"), a song written by Brazilian musician Marcos Valle with his brother Paulo Sérgio Valle.

"Crickets Sing for Anamaria" has been covered many times since, notably by English singer Emma Bunton, whose version peaked at number fifteen on the UK Singles Chart.

== Background ==
The song was originally released as an instrumental titled "Os Grilos" by the band Os Catedráticos on their 1965 album Ataque whose member, pianist Eumir Deodato, played as a sideman with Marcos Valle. Valle's instrumental version of the song appeared on his 1967 album Brazilliance! and became a "breakout hit". He also recorded a vocal version in Portuguese, which appeared on his 1967 EP Os Grilos. The English version, to which producer Ray Gilbert contributed the lyrics, appeared on Valle's 1968 album Samba '68. His then-wife, Ana Maria Carvalho was included in the title. Carvalho also sang on the album.

== Emma Bunton version ==
"Crickets Sing for Anamaria"

Single by Emma Bunton

from the album Free Me
- B-side: "Maybe" (Latino version); "Eso Beso"; "So Nice (Summer Samba)"
- Released: 31 May 2004
- Studio: Sarm West (London)
- Length: 2:46
- Label: Polydor; 19
- Songwriters: Marcos Valle; Ray Gilbert
- Producer: Mike Peden

Emma Bunton singles chronology
"I'll Be There" (2004)	"Crickets Sing for Anamaria" (2004)	"Downtown" (2006)

English singer Emma Bunton covered "Crickets Sing for Anamaria" for her second studio album, Free Me (2004). It was released on 31 May 2004 as the album's fourth and final single.

The music video for the song was directed by Harvey & Carolyn, who also worked with Bunton on the video for "Maybe". British actor Jake Canuso, who notably starred in Benidorm, co-starred in the music video as Bunton's love interest.

=== Background ===
For the B-sides, Bunton covered Paul Anka's "Eso Beso" and Valle's "So Nice (Summer Samba)". The only original B-side was the Latino version of "Maybe".

"Crickets Sing for Anamaria" would be the only cover on the song's respective album, Free Me.

=== Reception ===
Sal Cinquemani of Slant Magazine gave the song a positive review, noting that the song, along with other tracks from Free Me, is "what pure pop should be—frothy and inconsequential".

Pip Ellwood-Hughes of Entertainment Focus would put "Crickets Sing for Anamaria" on his list "Emma Bunton: her Top 10 solo singles to date". He said the "fun, carefree and light song is a bit bonkers", however, he'd add that the song suited the theme of its respective album, Free Me.

=== Commercial performance ===
The single debuted and peaked at number fifteen on the UK Singles Chart, Bunton's second single to miss the top-ten in UK after "We're Not Gonna Sleep Tonight". However, it also marked Bunton's comeback to the top-forty in Ireland, after failing to do so with Free Me's third single, "I'll Be There". The single also charted in Scotland, peaking at number eighteen.

The song would become Bunton's ninth best-selling song in the UK. It would also place on a list made by the Official Charts Company counting down all of the Spice Girls' solo singles, which Bunton is a member of, being thirty-sixth.

=== Track listings ===
- UK CD 1
1. "Crickets Sing for Anamaria" – 2:46
2. "Maybe" (Latino version) – 3:54
- UK CD 2
1. "Crickets Sing for Anamaria" – 2:46
2. "Eso Beso" – 3:14
3. "So Nice (Summer Samba)" – 3:11
4. "Crickets Sing for Anamaria" (Element's Crickets Dance on Tequila Booty mix) – 4:13

=== Credits and personnel ===
Credits adapted from the liner notes of Free Me.

- Emma Bunton – vocals
- Danny Cummings – percussion
- Richard Dowling – mastering
- Peter Gordeno – keyboards
- Martin Hayles – recording
- Graham Kearns – bass guitar
- Mike Peden – keyboards, production
- Frank Ricotti – vibes
- Charlie Russell – programming
- Phil Todd – flute
- Paul Turner – guitar

=== Charts ===
Chart (2004)	Peak position
Ireland (IRMA)	40
Scotland Singles (OCC)	18
UK Singles (OCC)	15

=== Release history ===
Release dates and formats for "Crickets Sing for Anamaria"
Region	Date	Format(s)	Label(s)	Ref.
United Kingdom	31 May 2004	CD single	Polydor; 19	

== Other versions ==
- In 1968, Brazilian singer Astrud Gilberto recorded a cover of the song for her album Windy.
