= Emma Bunton =

British singer (born 1976)

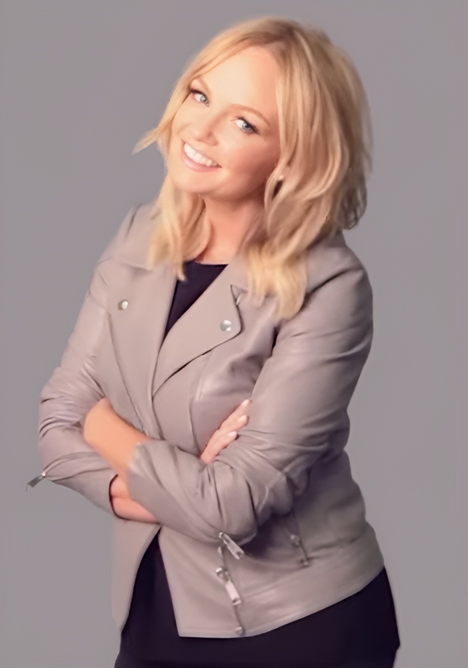
- Bunton in 2014
- Born: Emma Lee Bunton; 21 January 1976 (age 50); Finchley, London, England
- Other name: Baby Spice
- Education: Sylvia Young Theatre School
- Occupations: Singer; actress; media personality
- Years active: 1992–present
- Spouse: Jade Jones (m. 2021)
- Children: 2
- Musical career
- Genres: Pop; dance-pop
- Instruments: Vocals
- Labels: Virgin; 19; BMG
- Formerly of: Spice Girls

Emma Lee Bunton (born 21 January 1976) is an English singer, actress and media personality. She rose to fame in the mid-1990s as a member of the pop group the Spice Girls, in which she was nicknamed Baby Spice, due to the fact that she was the youngest member and "wore pigtails and sucked a lollipop". With over 100 million records sold worldwide, the Spice Girls are the best-selling female group in history. The group went on an indefinite hiatus in 2000, before reuniting for a greatest hits album (2007) and two concert tours: the Return of the Spice Girls (2007–2008) and Spice World (2019).

Bunton began her solo career with the release of her debut studio album, A Girl Like Me (2001), which debuted at number four on the UK Albums Chart, and was certified gold by the British Phonographic Industry. The album spawned the successful singles "What Took You So Long?", "What I Am" and "Take My Breath Away". Her second studio album, Free Me (2004), included the top-five single "Free Me", and the top-ten singles "Maybe" and "I'll Be There". Bunton's third studio album Life in Mono (2006), produced the successful single "Downtown". In 2019, she released her fourth studio album, My Happy Place.

Bunton has served as a judge on television talent shows, including Dancing on Ice (2010–2011), Your Face Sounds Familiar (2013), and Boy Band (2017). She competed on the fourth series of the BBC One dancing show Strictly Come Dancing in 2006. From 2013 to 2018, Bunton was a co-presenter on the Heart Breakfast radio show in London alongside Jamie Theakston. As of December 2024, she currently presents her own show for Heart Radio on Sunday evenings.

== Early life and career beginnings ==
Emma Lee Bunton was born on 21 January 1976 in Finchley, Barnet, London. Her parents, Pauline, a karate instructor, and Trevor Bunton, a milkman, split when she was 11, after which she stayed with her mother. She has a younger brother, Paul James. As stated in a TV interview with Eamonn Holmes and Ruth Langsford on This Morning during August 2016, Bunton's maternal family originate from County Wexford, Ireland. Bunton went to St Theresa's Roman Catholic Primary School in Finchley.

She enrolled in the Sylvia Young Theatre School. At the SYTS, she became friendly with Keeley Hawes; they lived and travelled together for six months.

Bunton appeared briefly in the BBC soap opera EastEnders in 1992 as a mugger. In 1993, she appeared in the ITV police drama The Bill, and made a brief appearance as a prostitute in the BBC drama series To Play the King. Bunton also appeared in a 1999 public information film for the British government concerning firework safety.

== Music career ==
=== 1994–2000: Spice Girls ===
In 1994, Melanie Chisholm, Melanie Brown, Geri Halliwell, and Victoria Adams responded to an advertisement in The Stage. Around 400 women who answered the ad went to Dance Works studios. Halliwell, Chisholm, Adams, and Brown were originally chosen as the members of the group, along with Michelle Stephenson, who due to her lack of commitment was briefly replaced by Abigail Kis, who was then replaced by Bunton. The group felt insecure about the lack of a contract and were frustrated by the direction in which Heart Management was steering them.

In October 1994, armed with a catalogue of demos and dance routines, the group began touring management agencies. They persuaded Bob Herbert to set up a showcase performance for the group in front of industry writers, producers and A&R men in December 1994 at the Nomis Studios in Shepherd's Bush where they received an "overwhelmingly positive" reaction. Due to the large interest in the group, the Herberts quickly set about creating a binding contract for the group. Encouraged by the reaction they had received at the Nomis showcase, all five members delayed signing contracts on the legal advice from, amongst others, Adams' father Anthony Adams. In March 1995, because of the group's frustration at their management's unwillingness to listen to their visions and ideas, they parted with Heart Management. Bunton was the youngest member of the group.

The group began a relationship with Simon Fuller of 19 Entertainment and finally signed with him in March 1995. During the summer of that year the group toured record labels in London and Los Angeles with Fuller and finally signed a deal with Virgin Records in September 1995. From this point on, up to the summer of 1996, the group continued to write and record tracks for their debut album while extensively touring the west coast of the United States, where they had signed a publishing deal with Windswept Pacific. On 8 July 1996, the Spice Girls released their debut single "Wannabe" in the United Kingdom. In the weeks leading up to the release, the video for "Wannabe", got a trial airing on The Box music channel. "Wannabe" proved to be a major hit, topping the UK Singles Chart for seven weeks and also topping the charts in a further 34 countries, including Australia, Denmark, France, Germany and the United States. and becoming the all-time biggest-selling single by an all-female group. It was followed by eight further number-one singles from their albums Spice, Spiceworld and Forever. Each member of the group received a nickname from the media. Bunton was named "Baby Spice".

Other successful releases followed, including "Say You'll Be There", "2 Become 1", "Who Do You Think You Are" and "Mama" from Spice, and "Spice Up Your Life", "Too Much", "Stop" and "Viva Forever" from Spiceworld. In 1999, she presented Emma on VH1. She recorded" (Hey You) Free Up Your Mind" for the film Pokémon: The First Movie and contributed background vocals to Melanie B's song "Sophisticated Lady", which appeared as a B-side to her single "Word Up". In November 1999, she released her debut single outside of her work with the Spice Girls, a cover of "What I Am" in collaboration with Tin Tin Out. In 2000, after the release of the group's comeback single, a double A-side of "Holler"/"Let Love Lead The Way" and the third studio album, Forever, which charted at number two in the UK, the Spice Girls stopped recording, concentrating on their solo careers in regards to their foreseeable future.

=== 2001–2005: A Girl Like Me and Free Me ===
Bunton's debut solo album, A Girl Like Me, was released in the United Kingdom on 16 April 2001 by Virgin Records. The album debuted and peaked at number four on the UK Albums Chart, with 21,500 copies sold in its first week. Its lead single, "What Took You So Long?", debuted at number one on the UK Singles Chart. Although initial success was promising, A Girl Like Me fell down the chart quickly. However, the top five single "Take My Breath Away", and top twenty "We're Not Gonna Sleep Tonight" helped the album stay on the UK Albums Chart for several weeks. On 7 September 2001, A Girl Like Me was certified gold by the British Phonographic Industry (BPI) for sales in excess of 100,000 copies, ultimately becoming the 147th best-selling album in the United Kingdom for 2001. The album sold 125,000 copies in the United Kingdom. The poor sales led to Bunton losing her contract with Virgin in 2002. Bunton performed at Party at the Palace, an event that was held at Buckingham Palace Garden on 3 June 2002 in commemoration of the Golden Jubilee of Elizabeth II. Her solo performances at the event were a cover of The Supremes' 1964 hit "Baby Love" and her own "What Took You So Long?".

After parting ways with Virgin, Bunton signed a new deal with 19 Recordings, run by former Spice Girls' manager Simon Fuller, to release her second album, Free Me, on 9 February 2004. The album was largely produced by Mike Peden and Yak Bondy. Other contributions on the album courtesy of Cathy Dennis, Henry Binns and Puerto Rican singer Luis Fonsi. Inspired by the Motown and the 1960s era, the album was widely acclaimed by critics by its "charm and grace". It debuted at number seven on the UK Albums Chart, spending over twelve weeks inside chart, and being certified gold by the British Phonographic Industry (BPI). The album had three top five singles in the United Kingdom – the title track, "Maybe" and "I'll Be There" – and a top twenty single, "Crickets Sing for Anamaria". In the United States, both "Free Me" and "Maybe" were dance club regulars, reaching numbers four and six on the US Billboard Hot Dance Club Play chart respectively. In 2005, Bunton appeared in the Bollywood film Chocolate: Deep Dark Secrets.

=== 2006–2008: Life in Mono and Spice Girls reunion ===
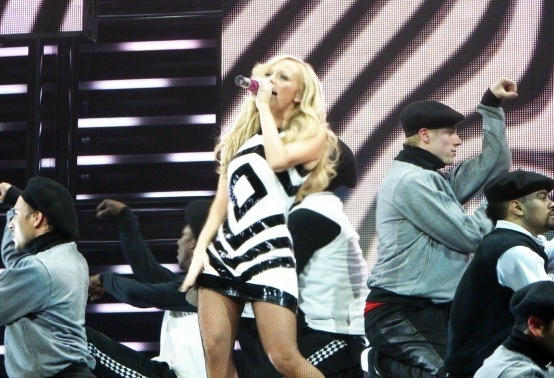
Bunton performing "Maybe" on The Return of the Spice Girls tour in 2007

In October 2006, Bunton was a contestant in the BBC programme Strictly Come Dancing, partnered with Darren Bennett. She reached the semi-final and finished in third place. On 13 November 2006, Bunton released the charity single for the BBC Children in Need appeal, recording Petula Clark's 1960s song "Downtown". It reached number three on the UK Singles Chart, and was followed by her third studio album, Life in Mono. Much like her previous album, Life in Mono experimented with elements of 1960s pop music. For this particular album, the musical arrangement was more directed towards the 1960s French pop music, with some elements of British 1960s pop and Motown. The album was Bunton's first not to reach the top ten in the United Kingdom, only reaching number 65 on the albums chart. The second single from it was "All I Need to Know", released on 12 February 2007, intended for Valentine's Day. Bunton shot the video around Old Street in East London, in the week before Christmas 2006. Entering the UK Singles Chart at number 60, "All I Need to Know" became the lowest-charting single of Bunton's solo career.

In 2007, the Spice Girls re-grouped and announced plans to tour as a quintet for the last time for The Return of the Spice Girls, from which they were said to have earned £10 million each (approximately $20 million). The team's members said that they were still enjoying doing their "own thing". The group decided to release their first compilation album, a collection of their Greatest Hits. This album was released in early November 2007, and the tour began on 2 December 2007. During the reformation Film maker Bob Smeaton directed an official film of the tour, which he titled Spice Girls: Giving You Everything. As well as their sell-out tour, the Spice Girls were contracted to appear in Tesco advertisements, for which they were paid £1 million each.

=== 2010–2014: Spice Girls musical and Olympics ===
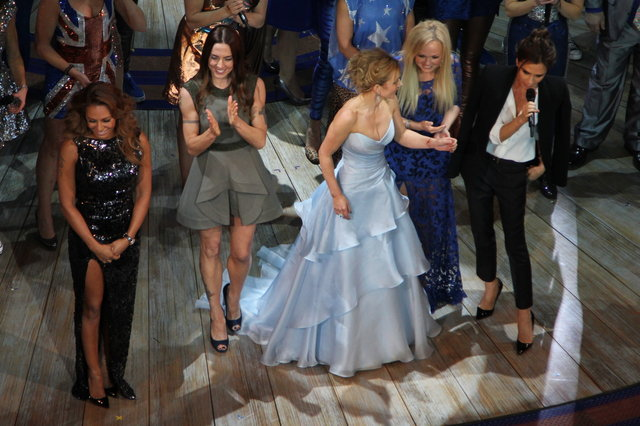
Brown, Chisholm, Halliwell, Bunton, and Beckham at the Viva Forever premiere

Judy Craymer teamed up with the Spice Girls and Simon Fuller and began to develop a Spice Girls musical entitled Viva Forever. Although the girls were not to star in the show themselves, they were to influence the show's cast and production choices in a story which uses their music but bears no relation to their personal story; similar to that of ABBA's music in Mamma Mia!. On 26 June 2012, all five Spice Girls were in attendance at a press conference in London to promote the launch of Viva Forever: The Musical. The press conference was held at St. Pancras Renaissance London Hotel, the location where the Spice Girls filmed the music video for their breakthrough hit "Wannabe", sixteen years earlier, to the day. The musical opened at the West End's Piccadilly Theatre on 11 December 2012. After poor reviews from critics and "a loss of £5 million", the show has its final performance on 29 June 2013. On 12 August 2012, after much speculation, Bunton and the Spice Girls performed a medley of "Wannabe" and "Spice Up Your Life" at the 2012 Summer Olympics closing ceremony, reuniting as a quintet for the last time for the event.

Their performance was the most tweeted moment of Olympics closing ceremony with over 116,000 tweets on Twitter per minute. Bunton also worked with fellow Spice Girl Melanie C on her 2012 album, Stages for the album track "I Know Him So Well". The song was released as a single on 11 November 2012. In March 2013, Bunton was named the Foxy Bingo Celebrity Mum of the Year. In March 2014, Bunton, along with Melanie C, took part in recording England's 2014 World Cup song. She collaborated with fellow pop stars Eliza Doolittle, Katy B, Conor Maynard, Kimberley Walsh and Pixie Lott on "Greatest Day", a track originally performed by British band Take That. The track was produced by Gary Barlow and recorded at Sarm Studios in London. The track also featured past footballers such as Gary Lineker, Michael Owen, Geoff Hurst, David Seaman, Peter Shilton, Glenn Hoddle and Dion Dublin on backing vocals.

=== 2018–present: My Happy Place and second Spice Girls reunion ===
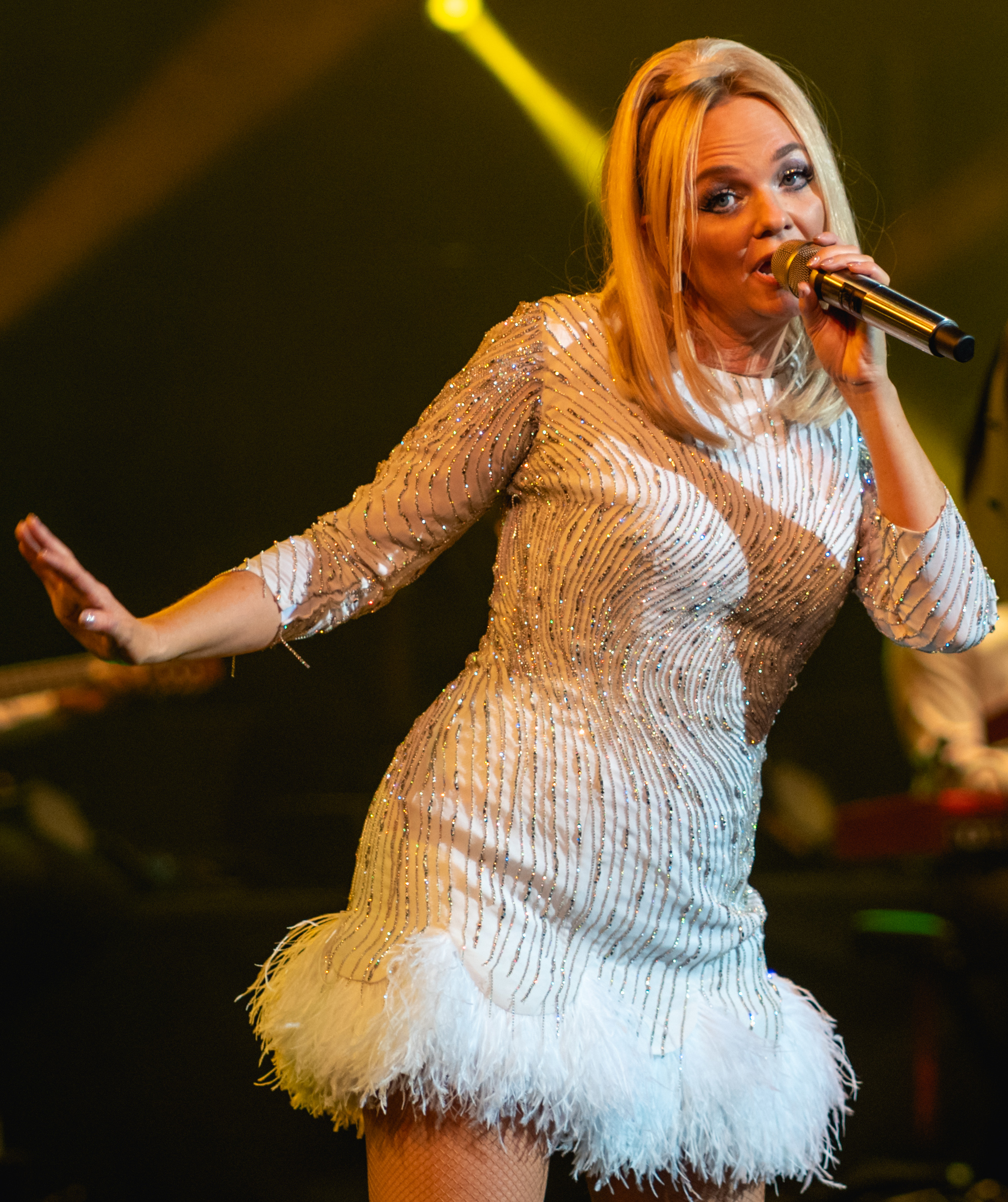
Emma Bunton in December 2019

In June 2018, Bunton said during an interview on This Morning that she was back in the studio working on new material, more than a decade after her last album, Life in Mono. Bunton told host Phillip Schofield, "I am back in the studio, and I'm saying this here for the first time....I am in the studio having fun with some music of my own, just to see". In November 2018, Bunton announced she had signed a record deal with BMG Rights Management and was preparing a new album.

In September 2018, she voices the character Mama Bear in the UK version of the successful animated movie Smallfoot, starring Channing Tatum, James Corden, LeBron James and Danny DeVito. The movie is a success and grossed $83.2 million in the United States and Canada, and $130.9 million in other territories, for a total worldwide gross of $214.1 million. In November 2018, Bunton reunited with the Spice Girls to announce a UK and Ireland Stadium tour, Spice World - 2019 Tour, which began at Croke Park, Dublin on 24 May 2019 and ended in London, England on 15 June 2019.

On 27 February 2019, she released the first single of the new album, "Baby Please Don't Stop", which received generally positive reviews. She later released a promo single, "Too Many Teardrops", on 9 March 2019. She then released her duet with her partner Jade Jones, "You're All I Need to Get By", a cover the Marvin Gaye and Tammi Terrell song. On 12 April 2019, Bunton released her fourth album, My Happy Place. The tracklist consists of two original songs and eight covers of songs beloved by Bunton. The album, which featured appearances from Jones, Robbie Williams, Will Young and Josh Kumra, sold 6,500 copies in its first week in the UK, and entered the UK Album Chart at number 11. My Happy Place became her first Top 20 album in 15 years. She later released a promotional single, "Too Many Teardrops", on 9 March 2019.

In November 2019, Bunton released a Christmas single, "Coming Home For Christmas", which also included a cover of "Santa Baby". On 6 December 2019, Bunton performed her first solo show in over a decade at the Royal Albert Hall in London. The concert was a special one-off Christmas show that featured Bunton performing well known Christmas covers as well as duets onstage with Will Young, Matt Goss and her fiancé Jade Jones. The inclusive theater company, Chickenshed, of which Bunton has been a patron for many years, also joined her onstage for a rendition of the Spice Girls song "Mama".

On 20 December 2024, Bunton released an orchestral version of "2 Become 1"; the single was created with the Budapest Scoring Orchestra. She performed the song on the Strictly Come Dancing Christmas Special, which aired on 25 December 2024.

== Other ventures ==
=== Radio ===
In February, and again between May and June 2009, Bunton starred as guest presenter on Heart London's Heart Breakfast alongside Jamie Theakston and Harriet Scott. Bunton began hosting her own pre-recorded Saturday drive time radio show on Heart in the Saturday afternoon slot 4–7 pm starting on Saturday 13 June 2009. Bunton provided maternity leave cover for Heart Breakfast co-presenter Harriet Scott from 3 October until 23 December 2011 on Heart London. Following Harriet Scott's departure from Heart Breakfast in November 2012, it was announced Bunton would succeed her as co-host along with Jamie Theakston from 7 January 2013. She co-presented with Theakston until 10 December 2018, making her final Heart Breakfast appearance on 14 December. In March 2017, Bunton won the awards for "Radio Presenter of the Year" and "Digital Radio Programme" at the annual Television and Radio Industries Club (TRIC) Awards for her work on Heart London. In January 2018, Bunton was offered a new Sunday night show that runs between 7 and 10. The first show aired on 14 January.

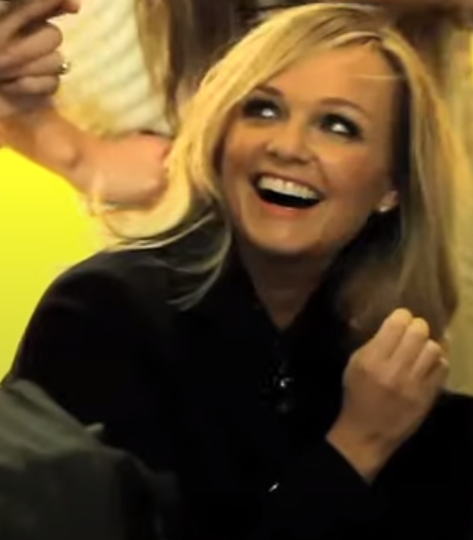
Bunton at a photoshoot for her Argos fashion line in 2014

Bunton left Heart London Breakfast at Christmas 2018 to focus on the 2019 Spice Girls Tour. She currently still presents the Sunday Evening Heart Show, Hearts Feel Good Weekend with Emma Bunton.

=== Television and films ===
Bunton has been seen in a television commercial for the supermarket chain Tesco. She also had a cameo role on the Australian soap opera Neighbours in the episode "What's a Spice Girl Like You...?". In July 2008, Bunton stood in as co-presenter alongside Richard Madeley on the television show Richard & Judy while Judy Finnigan was recovering from a knee operation. In October 2008, Bunton appeared on the UK series of The X Factor to assist judge Dannii Minogue in choosing the three best over-25s acts to take through to the live shows. In December 2008, Bunton debuted as a member of the panel on Loose Women on ITV.

In February 2010, Bunton appeared in a UK National Television campaign first aired during Coronation Street, showing her in the Heart Radio studios at the start and the end of the advert. In January 2010, Bunton joined the "Ice Panel" on ITV dancing show Dancing on Ice replacing former judge Ruthie Henshall. She stepped down from this role on 2 December 2011. Bunton hosted Channel 5's Don't Stop Believing from July to August 2010. In August 2010, Bunton guest presented GMTV with Lorraine on GMTV. On 8 October 2010, 19 November 2010 and 7 January 2011, she guest presented Lorraine on ITV Breakfast.

In January 2012, Bunton reprised her role as one of fictional PR manager Edina Monsoon's disgruntled clients in a revival of the BBC's Absolutely Fabulous. In August that same year, Bunton made a cameo appearance in Keith Lemon: The Film. In the summer of 2013, Bunton was a judge on the ITV Saturday night entertainment series Your Face Sounds Familiar alongside Julian Clary and a different guest judge each week. In October 2014, Bunton appeared on The X Factor to assist judge and fellow Spice Girl Mel B in choosing the three best boys acts to take through to the live shows. In 2015, Bunton made a cameo appearance in Spanish comedy film Cómo sobrevivir a una despedida, during a scene in which the five main characters are seen impersonating the Spice Girls in a talent show. In March 2016, Bunton has co-presented Too Much TV, a daily magazine show on BBC Two. In 2015, Bunton made a cameo appearance in the 2016 film Absolutely Fabulous: The Movie. In addition, she gave her voice to Muhimu in the UK version of the episode "The Mbali Fields Migration" of the Disney Channel's television series The Lion Guard.

In 2017, she appeared as a judge in the TV show Boy Band alongside Nick Carter, Rita Ora and Timbaland.

=== Fashion ===
In 2011, Bunton teamed up with British retailer Argos to launch a series of childrenswear lines.

=== Philanthropy ===
In 1999, 2001 and 2003 she was one of the donors of the charity campaign Nordoff-Robbins, focused in therapy for children with psychological, physical or developmental disabilities. In April 1999 she helped launch the National Society for the Prevention of Cruelty to Children's anti-child abuse campaign with Tony Blair and Prince Andrew. She also starred in a government safety campaign to warn drinkers of the dangers of handling fireworks, recording commercials to air on television. In 2000 Bunton supported the charity campaign Children Nationwide, which raised money to finance the research into childhood diseases. In 2001 she donated £500,000 to performing arts and music charities funds. In 2006 she was ambassador of BBC's Children in Need and released the charity single "Downtown", donating the money for the campaign. In 2010 she supported the World Children's Champions. In 2011, Bunton was ambassador of Heart's Have a Heart campaign to help homeless people.

In 2013, she supported the UNICEF's campaign Every Parent's Dream, which raised money for vaccine against maternal and newborn tetanus (MNT). In 2014 she became an ambassador of UNICEF and travelled to Africa to assist in humanitarian work to eradicate the MNT. In April 2015, Bunton teamed up with Specsavers in Bishop's Stortford to launch a contest, where each entry would generate £1 for anti-bullying charity Kidscape to help vulnerable children.

== Personal life ==
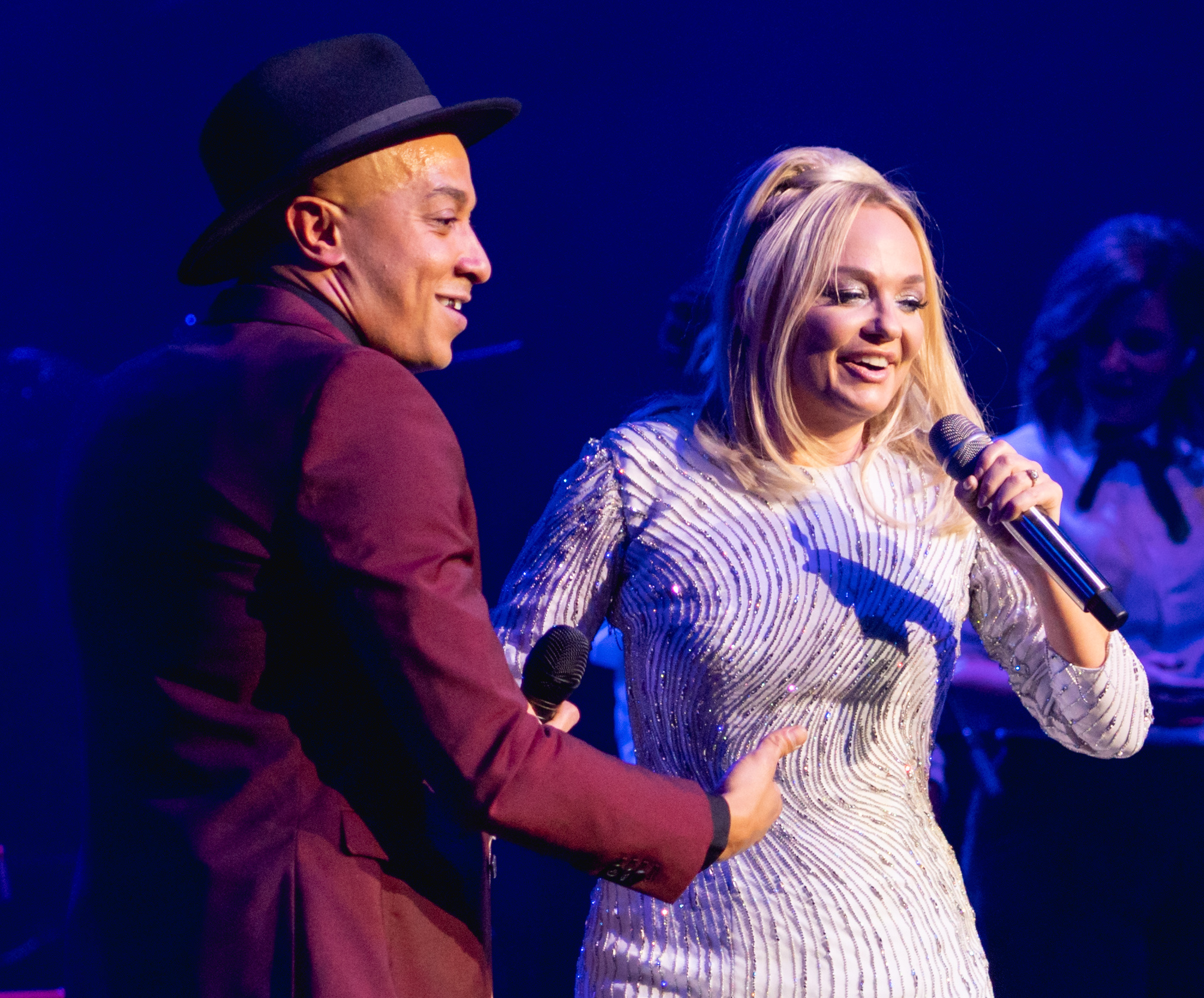
Bunton performing with husband Jade Jones in 2019.

In 1997, Bunton dated British singer Lee Brennan. In the same year, she was briefly linked to American actor Leonardo DiCaprio. In 1998, she began dating British singer Jade Jones, from the group Damage, but they split for the first time in May 1999. From September 1999 to September 2000, Bunton was in a relationship with the England footballer Rio Ferdinand, who was introduced by her friends David Beckham and Victoria Beckham. From November 2000 to March 2002, she was again in a relationship with Jones. In 2003, she was briefly linked to American singer Justin Timberlake.

In 2004, Bunton again began dating Jade Jones after having previously broken up twice. On 26 January 2007 she announced her pregnancy. The couple's first child was born on 10 August 2007. On 6 May 2011, their second child was born. The couple became engaged on 21 January 2011 but Bunton said that she did not want to get married in a civil or religious ceremony, stating: "We don't need a wedding to justify our relationship." Nevertheless, Bunton and Jones married on 13 July 2021.

In 1999, Bunton moved to a £1.6 million penthouse in the Mount Vernon Village, in Hampstead, London. In 2003, she had some problems with neighbours, who complained about her late-night parties. In 2006, she and Jones moved to a house in Barnet, London. Bunton was diagnosed with endometriosis. She is also a godmother to Geri Halliwell's daughter. Bunton is a supporter of Tottenham Hotspur football club.

== Discography ==
- A Girl Like Me (2001)
- Free Me (2004)
- Life in Mono (2006)
- My Happy Place (2019)

== Filmography ==
=== Television ===
Year	Title	Role	Notes
1992	EastEnders	Mugger Girl	Episode: "18 August 1992"
1993	The Bill	Janice	Episode: "Missionary Work"
1993	To Play the King	Prostitute	Episode: "28 November 1993"
1993	Thatcherworld	Josie Jenkins	Unsold BBC pilot
1999	Emma	Presenter	
2000	Celebrity	Presenter	
2003	Absolutely Fabulous	Herself	Episodes: "Cleanin'" and "Huntin', Shootin', Fishin'"
2005	Emma Goes to Bollywood	Herself	Television documentary
2005	I Love the '90s: Part Deux	Presenter	
2005	Comic Relief Sketch Special	Herself	Television special
2006	Neighbours	Herself	Episode: "What's a Spice Girl Like You...?"
2006	Strictly Come Dancing	Contestant	Series 4 – third place
2007	Giving You Everything	Herself	Television documentary
2008	American Idol	Guest Judge	Episode: "Live Shows: Top 8"
2008	Richard & Judy	Guest Presenter	Episode: "24 July 2008"
2008	Loose Women	Guest Presenter	Episodes: "1–5 December 2008"
2008–2012	Celebrity Juice	Panelist	
2008; 2014; 2016	The X Factor	Mentor Assistant	Series 5, 11 and 13
2009	Ant & Dec's Christmas Show	Evil Stepmother	Television special
2009	Eurovision: Your Country Needs You	Judge	Episode: "24 January 2009"
2009	Let's Dance for Comic Relief	Judge	Episode: "21 February 2009"
2010	Don't Stop Believing	Presenter	
2010	The Million Pound Drop Live	Celebrity Contestant	Season 3, episode 3
2010	GMTV with Lorraine	Relief Presenter	
2010–2011	Lorraine	Relief Presenter	
2010–2011	Dancing on Ice	Judge / Mentor	Seasons 5–6
2012	Absolutely Fabulous: 20th anniversary	Herself	Episodes: "Job" and "Sport Relief Special"
2012	The Spice Girls Story: Viva Forever!	Herself	Television documentary
2013	Your Face Sounds Familiar	Judge / Mentor	
2013	This Morning Summer	Presenter	
2013	I Heart Glee	Presenter	Television special
2015	The Rocky Horror Show Live	Narrator	Television special
2016	Too Much TV	Presenter	
2016	Drunk History	Maid Marian / Catherine Parr	Episodes: "One" and "Nine"
2016	Murder in Successville	Sidekick	Episode: "Head, Shoulders, Knees & Toes"
2016	Josh	Herself	Episode: "Share & Share Alike"
2016	The Lion Guard	Muhimu	Voice; Guest role (UK dub) Episode: "The Mbali Fields Migration"
2017	Not Going Out	Herself	Episode: "Hot Tub"
2017	Boy Band	Judge	
2017	Tim Vine Travels in Time	Anne Boleyn	Television special
2018	RuPaul's Drag Race All Stars	Judge	Season 3, episode: "Handmaids to Kitty Girls"
2018–present	The Great American Baking Show	Host	Season 4–present
2021	RuPaul's Drag Race UK	Judge	Series 3, episode: "Big Drag Energy"
2022	Concert For Ukraine	Presenter	
2022	The Circle	Contestant	Season 4; played with Mel B, as catfish "Jared"
2024	Strictly Come Dancing	Herself/Performer	Christmas special; performed "2 Become 1"
2025	KPopped	Herself / Western Collaborator	Episode: "Itzy"

=== Film ===
Year	Title	Role	Notes
1997	Spice World	Baby Spice	
2001	Yes You Can	Pop Angel	Short film
2001	Zoolander	Herself	
2005	Pyaar Mein Twist	Kylie Milligan	Bollywood Hindi debut
2005	Chocolate	Tabetha Gagoh	Hindi movie
2008	The Queen: A Life in Film	Herself	Documentary
2012	Keith Lemon: The Film	Herself	
2015	Cómo sobrevivir a una despedida (Girl's Night Out)	Herself	
2016	Absolutely Fabulous: The Movie	Herself	Cameo
2018	Smallfoot	Mama Bear (voice)	UK version

== Concert tours ==
- Live in Concert (2001)
- Free Me Tour (2004)
- Emma Bunton's Christmas Party - Live at the Royal Albert Hall (2019)
- Emma Bunton and Friends (2022)

Date (2022)	City	Country	Venue	Friends
12 December	Manchester	England	Manchester Bridgewater Hall	Will Young
13 December	Brighton	England	Brighton Dome	
16 December	York	England	York Barbican	Cancelled due to illness
17 December	Birmingham	England	Birmingham Symphony Hall	Cancelled due to illness
19 December	London	England	London Theatre Royal Drury Lane	Mel C, Ricky Wilson & Jade Jones

== Radio ==
Year	Title	Role	Times	Station
2009–2017	Saturday Drivetime	Presenter	5pm–7pm	Heart
2013–2018	Heart Breakfast	Presenter	6am–9am	Heart
2018–present	Sunday Evenings	Presenter	7pm–10pm	Heart

== Books ==
- Mama You Got This: A Little Helping Hand for New Parents. Ebury Press. 1 May 2022. ISBN 978-1529104561.

== Awards and nominations ==
Year	Award	Category	Work	Result	Ref.
1999	Kids' Choice Awards	Favorite Movie Actress	Spice World	Nominated	
1999	Blockbuster Entertainment Awards	Favorite Actress: Comedy	Spice World	Nominated	
2001	Smash Hits Poll Awards	Best Female Solo Artist	Herself	Nominated	
2004	Meteor Awards	Best Female Singer	Herself	Nominated	
2004	Popjustice £20 Music Prize	Best Song	"Maybe"	Nominated	
2008	Foxy Bingo Awards	Celebrity Mum of the Year	Herself	Nominated	
2010	Glamour Awards	Radio Personality	The Saturday Show	Nominated	
2010	Arqiva Commercial Radio Awards	Newcomer	The Saturday Show	Nominated	
2011	Glamour Awards	Radio Personality	The Saturday Show	Nominated	
2012	TRIC Awards	Radio Personality	The Saturday Show	Nominated	
2013	Glamour Awards	Radio Personality	Heart Breakfast	Nominated	
2013	Radio Academy Awards	Listeners Choice Award	Heart Breakfast	Nominated	
2013	Foxy Bingo Awards	Celebrity Mum of the Year	Herself	Won	
2014	Radio Times	Best Strictly Come Dancing Contestant of All Time	Strictly Come Dancing	Won	
2014	TRIC Awards	Radio Personality	Heart Breakfast	Won	
2014	TRIC Awards	Radio Programme	Heart Breakfast	Nominated	
2016	Glamour Awards	Radio Personality	Heart Breakfast	Nominated	
2017	TRIC Awards	Radio Personality	Herself	Won	
