= All I Need to Know (Emma Bunton song) =

2007 single by Emma Bunton

Single by Emma Bunton

from the album Life in Mono
- B-side: "Midnight and Martinis"
- Released: 12 February 2007
- Length: 4:18
- Label: Universal
- Songwriters: Emma Bunton; Jamie Hartman
- Producer: Simon Franglen

Emma Bunton singles chronology
"Downtown" (2006)	"All I Need to Know" (2007)	"I Know Him So Well" (2012)

Music video
- "All I Need to Know" on YouTube

"All I Need to Know" is a song by British singer Emma Bunton. It was written by Bunton and Jamie Hartman for her third studio album, Life in Mono (2006), and produced by Simon Franglen.

== Critical reception ==
"All I Need to Know" received mixed to positive reviews. John Murphy from MusicOMH called the song "similarly arresting," describing it as "a beautifully tender piano ballad that the likes of Lucie Silvas would be well advised to take note of," while Liz Hoggard, writing for The Observer, deemed it "breathtakingly lovely." Fraser McAlpine of BBC Radio 1's TheChartBlog wrote: "The first verse is wafty and piano-led, then there's a quiet chorus, then the drums kick in for a meatier version of same", while adding "the dragging pace and out-dated 'classy' production are going to get really boring, really quickly" and comparing it negatively to the Spice Girls's 1998 song "Viva Forever."

== Chart performance ==
First announced as the album's second and final single on Bunton's official site, "All I Need to Know" was made available by Universal Music as a download from 5 February 2007. Ultimately released physically on 12 February 2007 in the United Kingdom and Ireland, the song entered the UK Singles Chart in the week of 24 February 2007 at number 60 and charted for only one week before falling out, making it the lowest charting single of Bunton's career at the time. "All I Need to Know" also peaked at number 26 on the Scottish Singles Chart.

== Music video ==
Directed by Dania Pasquini and Max Giwa unter their moniker Max & Dania, a music video for "All I Need to Know" was shot in December 2006 shortly before Christmas in the East End of London. The visuals were originally inspired by the photography of fashion photographer Peter Lindbergh, and feature Bunton as an angel watching over various lonely people, none of whom can see her. The only trace of her presence are floating feathers that come from her wings, which are only observable as reflections or from a distance.

== Track listings ==
UK CD single
No.	Title	Writer(s)	Producer(s)	Length
1.	"All I Need to Know" (single edit)	Emma Bunton; Jamie Hartman	Simon Franglen	3:36
2.	"Midnight and Martinis"	Bunton; Lee Dagger; Lisa Greene; Marc Jackson Burrows	Dagger; Marc JB	4:14

UK iTunes digital single
No.	Title	Writer(s)	Producer(s)	Length
1.	"All I Need to Know" (single edit)	Bunton; Hartman	Franglen	3:36
2.	"All I Need to Know" (Bimbo Jones vocal club mix)	Bunton; Hartman	Franglen; Bimbo Jones^{[a]}	6:53
3.	"Midnight and Martinis"	Bunton; Dagger; Greene; Burrows	Dagger; Marc JB	4:14

Notes

- ^{^[a]} signifies an additional producer

== Credits and personnel ==
Credits lifted from the liner notes of Life in Mono.

- Jon Bailey – engineer
- Chris Barrett – recording assistant
- Nick Beggs – bass
- Emma Bunton – vocals, writer
- Nick Cervonaro – engineering assistant
- Martin Ditcham – drums
- Simon Franglen – producer
- David Hartley – arranger
- David Keary – guitar
- David Hartley – piano
- Jamie Hartman – writer
- Steve Whelton-James – additional programming
- Gavin Wright – orchestra leader

== Charts ==
Weekly chart performance for "All I Need to Know"
Chart (2007)	Peak position
Scotland Singles (OCC)	24
UK Singles (OCC)	60
