= Free Me (Emma Bunton song) =

2003 single by Emma Bunton

Single by Emma Bunton

from the album Free Me
- B-side: "Who the Hell are You"; "Tomorrow"
- Released: 26 May 2003
- Length: 4:28
- Label: 19; Universal
- Songwriters: Emma Bunton; Hélène Muddiman; Mike Peden
- Producer: Mike Peden

Emma Bunton singles chronology
"We're Not Gonna Sleep Tonight" (2001)	"Free Me" (2003)	"Maybe" (2003)

Licensed audio
- "Free Me" on YouTube

"Free Me" is a song by English singer Emma Bunton from her second solo studio album of the same name (2003). It was written by Bunton along with Hélène Muddiman and Mike Peden, and produced by the latter. The song was released by 19 Recordings and Universal Records on 26 May 2003 as the album's lead single. "Free Me" debuted and peaked at number five on the UK Singles Chart, becoming Bunton's fourth UK top-five single. The single also peaked at number four on the US Hot Dance Club Play chart.

== Background ==
In 2001, Bunton released her first solo album, A Girl Like Me, through Virgin Records. It spent over 12 weeks in the UK Albums Chart, peaking at number four and earning a gold certification from the British Phonographic Industry (BPI). It also produced her only solo chart-topper "What Took You So Long?", as well as the top-five singles "What I Am" and "Take My Breath Away", and the top-20 entry "We're Not Gonna Sleep Tonight". She then left Virgin, and signed a new deal with 19 Recordings, run by the former Spice Girls' manager Simon Fuller.

== Commercial performance ==
Released on 26 May 2003 in the United Kingdom, "Free Me" debuted and peaked at number five on the UK Singles Chart in the week ending 7 June 2003, becoming Bunton's fourth non-consecutive UK top-five single. It also reached number five on the Scottish Singles Chart and peaked at number 33 on the Irish Singles Chart. In the United States, "Free Me" peaked at number four on Billboard's Hot Dance Club Play chart. It was Bunton's first solo single to enter the chart.

== Music video ==
A music video for "Free Me" was directed by Tim Royes and filmed in Rio de Janeiro, Brazil, including locations such as Macumba Beach, Guanabara Bay and the Alto da Boa Vista neighbourhood.

== Track listings ==
UK CD 1
No.	Title	Writer(s)	Producer(s)	Length
1.	"Free Me"	Emma Bunton; Hélène Muddiman; Mike Peden	Peden	3:36
2.	"Who the Hell Are You"	Bunton; Nigel Butler; Ray Hedges	Hedges	3:20
3.	"Free Me" (Full Intention's Freed Up Mix)	Bunton; Muddiman; Peden	Peden; Michael Gray & Jon Pearn^{[a]}	7:08
4.	"Free Me" (video)			4:28

UK CD 2
No.	Title	Writer(s)	Producer(s)	Length
1.	"Free Me"	Bunton; Muddiman; Peden	Peden	4:28
2.	"Tomorrow"	Bunton; Yak Bondy	Bondy	3:56
3.	"Free Me" (Full Intention's Sultra Mix)	Bunton; Muddiman; Peden	Peden; Michael Gray & Jon Pearn^{[a]}	6:18

Notes

- ^{^[a]} signifies an additional producer

== Credits and personnel ==
Credits adapted from the liner notes of Free Me.

- Emma Bunton – vocals, songwriting
- Richard Dowling – mastering
- Martin Hayles – keyboards, recording
- Graham Kearns – guitar
- Nick Ingman – orchestra arrangement, orchestra conducting
- Isobel Griffiths Ltd – orchestra contractor
- Hélène Muddiman – backing vocals, keyboards, songwriting
- Mike Peden – bass guitar, production, songwriting
- Charlie Russell – live drums, programming
- Mark Stent – mixing
- Gavyn Wright – orchestra leader

== Charts ==
=== Weekly charts ===
Weekly chart performance for "Free Me"
Chart (2003–2004)	Peak position
Europe (Eurochart Hot 100 Singles)	20
Ireland (IRMA)	33
Scotland Singles (Official Charts)	5
UK Singles (Official Charts)	5
US Dance Club Songs (Billboard)	4
US Dance Airplay (Billboard)	8

=== Year-end charts ===
Year-end chart performance for "Free Me"
Chart (2003)	Position
UK Singles (OCC)	134

== Release history ==
Release dates and formats for "Free Me"
Region	Date	Format	Label	Ref.
United Kingdom	26 May 2003	CD single; cassette single	Polydor	
