= My Happy Place =

2019 album by Emma Bunton

Studio album by Emma Bunton
- Released: 12 April 2019
- Recorded: September 2018
- Studio: Metrophonic (London)
- Genre: Pop
- Length: 33:33
- Label: BMG
- Producer: Paul Meehan; Brian Rawling

Emma Bunton chronology
Life in Mono (2006)	My Happy Place (2019)

Singles from My Happy Place
- 1. "Baby Please Don't Stop" Released: 27 February 2019; 2. "Too Many Teardrops" Released: 8 March 2019; 3. "You're All I Need to Get By" Released: 29 March 2019

My Happy Place is the fourth studio album by the British singer Emma Bunton. It was released on 12 April 2019 by BMG Rights Management. Her first album in over a decade, following Life in Mono (2006), the album was produced by Paul Meehan and Brian Rawling. It features ten tracks, including eight cover versions of some of Bunton's favourite songs and two original songs co-written by the singer.

The album received mixed reviews, with critics praising Bunton's warm vocals and standout originals like "Baby Please Don't Stop," but criticizing much of the cover material as dull and lacking personality. Commercially, My Happy Plac debuted and peaked at number 11 on the UK Albums Chart, marking her third non-consecutive top 20 entry, and also charted in the UK download, physical, sales, and independent charts, also reaching number seven on the Scottish Albums Chart.

== Background and development ==
The album was inspired by 1960's sounds, like motown and sixties pop. In January 2010, Bunton stated that she had no plans to record a new album. She stated that while she loves singing, in her view it takes a lot of time and work to promote an album, and said that she would rather focus her time on her son Beau, who was born in 2007. In February 2018, it was reported that Bunton was secretly recording new music. Bunton officially acknowledged the fact that she was recording new music on This Morning in June 2018.

In November 2018, Bunton revealed that she had signed a record deal with BMG Rights Management and would be releasing a new album in 2019. The album was officially announced on 25 February 2019. Explaining the album's title, Bunton said: "The reason I called the album My Happy Place is because my happy place is with my family, with my friends, listening to music and being in the studio. All those things came together on this album. While recording it my kids came to the studio, my friends came down, my mum listened to every song over and over again. Being in the studio I just feel so happy".

== Singles ==
"Baby Please Don't Stop" was released as the lead single from the album on 27 February 2019.

On 8 March 2019, the second original track "Too Many Teardrops" was released as a buzz track. The song was described as "a resilient breakup anthem that sees her moving on from a failed relationship".

A cover of the Marvin Gaye and Tammi Terrell song "You're All I Need to Get By" was released as the album's second and final single from the album on 29 March 2019. An accompanying music video starring Bunton's husband Jade Jones who duets on the song with her, was released on 13 May 2019.

== Critical reception ==
Professional ratings
Review scores
Source	Rating
Albumism	4/5 stars
AllMusic	2.5/5 stars
Darkstars	7.5/10
The Guardian	2/5 stars
The Irish News	6/10
The Leader	6/10
Metro	2/5 stars

My Happy Place received mixed reviews upon release. Some critics praised the cheerfulness and maturity of the album, whilst others criticised that it lacked in personality.

Quentin Harrison of Albumism gave the album four out of five stars, writing "It is a welcome return for the pop vocalist even with it breaking no new ground in the process", and referred to the original songs, "Baby Please Don't Stop" and "Too Many Teardrops" as the standout tracks. The Irish News gave the album a 6/10 rating, naming "You're All I Need to Get By" the "strongest offering" on the record and referred to the rendition of "Here Comes the Sun" as "adorable", and concluding saying: "Some of her covers get lost in translation but mostly this is sweetly inoffensive". Florian Buechting of flyctory.com gave the album three out of five stars, writing that it is "not all bad, but definitely not a must-buy as well. But listening to it the second and third time (which is very quick due to the limited playtime) makes it feel better and better". The Herald Standard gave the album a positive review. Mathias Frank of Gaeliste commented that the songs are "charmingly reinterpreted without destroying anything", praising the original tracks as well as the album's version of "2 Become 1". Nina Mende of Tempelores wrote that "with a warm and soft voice, [Bunton] is singing each song, comforting you so you will gently sway along". Chris Strieder of Darkstars awarded the album 7.5 out of 10 stars, calling its content "great and well-produced radio pop". The Leader called My Happy Place "a sweetly inoffensive body of work that shows off [Bunton's] tuneful, easy-on-the-ears vocal and loveable personality".

Metro gave My Happy Place a negative review, awarding it two out of five stars. The review praised the first three songs, but added that the rest "is a series of covers that seem to exist for no benefit other than Bunton’s. Given how well it started and how swiftly it palls thereafter, you’ll just wish you could love Bunton’s Happy Place more". Thiago Nolla of Cinepop gave it two and a half stars out of five, criticising it for lacking in personality and uniqueness and felt that Bunton lost herself "in the midst of so many unnecessary emulations" and seemed "stagnant in a remote past". However, he praised "Too Many Teardrops" and "Baby Please Don't Stop", noting the latter has her "best vocals and creates a engaging, sexy and breathtaking atmosphere". Aimee Cliff of The Guardian gave the album 2 out of five stars, concluding the review by writing: "It’s heartwarming to hear someone who has been through the mill of pop megastardom emerge so blatantly, straightforwardly happy. Unfortunately, with no drama or risks, it’s also incredibly dull". AllMusic gave the album 2.5 out of five stars, praising the originals songs, as well as the covers of "I Wish I Could Have Loved You More" and "Don't Call Me Baby", but felt that the album as a whole was "a mixed bag".

== Chart performance ==
My Happy Place debuted and peaked at number 11 on the UK Albums Chart. This marked Bunton's third non-consecutive top 20 entry on the chart. Elsewhere in the UK, the debuted at number 9 on the UK Album Downloads, and number 6 on both the Physical Albums, and the Albums Sales Chart. The album peaked at number three on Independent Albums Chart, spending eight weeks on that chart. My Happy Place also debuted at number 7 on the Scottish Albums Chart. The album also charted in six other countries, with minor commercial success.

== Track listing ==
My Happy Place track listing
No.	Title	Writer(s)	Length
1.	"Baby Please Don't Stop"	Emma Bunton; Paul Barry; Patrick Mascall	3:00
2.	"I Wish I Could Have Loved You More"	Candie Payne; Simon Dine	3:23
3.	"Too Many Teardrops"	Bunton; Barry; Mascall	3:01
4.	"I Only Want to Be with You" (featuring Will Young)	Ivor Raymonde; Mike Hawker	3:58
5.	"Don't Call Me Baby"	Andy Van Dorsselaer; Cheyne Coates; Gene McFadden; Duane Morrison; John Whitehead; Jerry Cohen; Giuseppe Chierchia	4:05
6.	"You're All I Need to Get By" (featuring Jade Jones)	Nickolas Ashford; Valerie Simpson	2:48
7.	"Come Away with Me" (featuring Josh Kumra)	Norah Jones	2:49
8.	"Emotion"	Barry Gibb; Robin Gibb	3:39
9.	"2 Become 1" (featuring Robbie Williams)	Bunton; Victoria Adams; Melanie Brown; Geri Halliwell; Melanie Chisholm; Matthew Rowbottom; Richard Stannard	3:42
10.	"Here Comes the Sun"	George Harrison	3:08
Total length:			33:33

== Personnel ==
Credits are adapted from the album's liner notes.

- Emma Bunton – vocals
- Paul Meehan – production, keyboards, programming
- Brian Rawling – production
- Matt Furmidge – engineering (all tracks), mixing (2–10)
- Ash Howes – mixing (1)
- Dick Beetham – mastering
- Jade Jones – vocal arrangement (all tracks), vocals (6), backing vocals (9)
- Adam Phillips – guitar
- Will Young – vocals (4)
- Josh Kumra – vocals (7)
- Robbie Williams – vocals (9)
- Hayley Sanderson – backing vocals (1, 3, 5, 6, 8, 10)
- Paul Barry – guitar (1, 3)
- Patrick Mascall – guitar (3)
- Nick Squires – cello (7, 8, 10)
- Jonty Davies – photography
- Big Active – design

== Charts ==
Weekly chart performance for My Happy Place
Chart (2019)	Peak position
Australian Albums (ARIA)	92
French Physical Albums (SNEP)	174
Irish Albums (IRMA)	88
Scottish Albums (OCC)	7
Spanish Albums (PROMUSICAE)	55
UK Albums (OCC)	11
UK Independent Albums (OCC)	3
US Top Heatseekers Albums (Billboard)	7

== Release history ==
My Happy Place release history
Country	Date	Edition	Format	Label	Ref.
France	12 April 2019	Standard	Digital download	BMG	
Germany	12 April 2019	Standard	Digital download	BMG	
United Kingdom	12 April 2019	Standard; deluxe	CD; digital download; cassette; LP	BMG	
Australia	12 April 2019	Standard; deluxe	CD; digital download	BMG	
United States	12 April 2019	Standard	Digital download	BMG	
