= We're Not Gonna Sleep Tonight =

2001 single by Emma Bunton

Single by Emma Bunton

from the album A Girl Like Me
- B-side: "Let Your Baby Show You How to Move"
- Released: 10 December 2001
- Studio: Sound Gallery (Los Angeles, California)
- Length: 3:23
- Label: Virgin
- Songwriters: Emma Bunton; Rhett Lawrence
- Producer: Rhett Lawrence

Emma Bunton singles chronology
| "Take My Breath Away" (2001) | "We're Not Gonna Sleep Tonight" (2001) | "Free Me" (2003) |

Licensed audio
- "We're Not Gonna Sleep Tonight" on YouTube

Licensed audio
- "We're Not Gonna Sleep Tonight" on YouTube

"We're Not Gonna Sleep Tonight" is a song by English recording artist Emma Bunton from her debut solo album, A Girl Like Me (2001). Written by Bunton and Rhett Lawrence, the track was released in the United Kingdom as the album's third and final single on 10 December 2001. It debuted and peaked at number 20 on the UK Singles Chart, becoming the album's lowest-peaking single.

== Background ==
"We're Not Gonna Sleep Tonight" was written by Bunton and Rhett Lawrence for her debut solo album, A Girl Like Me (2001). a nu disco track that was originally produced by Lawrence, "We're Not Gonna Sleep Tonight" was remixed into a latin-tinged uptempo track when it was selected as the album's third and final single. Andy Wright was consulted to produce on the single edit.

== Critical reception ==
Jason Fox from NME noted that with "We're Not Gonna Sleep Tonight" Bunton "is back on the cheesy dancefloor of clubland, scrapping it out in a battle of the handbags with the dreadful Dannii and Sophie Ellis-Bextor, a woman so ill-suited to such indignities it's almost scary. Emma's got it in her bones." In his review of parent album A Girl Like Me, Fox's colleague Timothy Mark ranked the song album the album's "several lovely moments" and wrote: "Dedicated to the Girls, [this] could've been a contender for the – sadly never made – second Mel & Kim LP." AllMusic editor Stewart Mason called the song "slinky" and found that it sounds "like the singles that should have been from the Spice Girls' disappointing last album, unapologetically catchy and well-constructed pop songs in a style that's been a part of pop music since the days of Lesley Gore or the Supremes."

== Commercial performance ==
The song was issued as the album's third and final single on 10 December 2001 in the United Kingdom. It debuted and peaked at number 20 on the UK Singles Chart in the week ending 22 December 2001, becoming Bunton's fourth consecutive solo top-20 entry after "What I Am" (1999), "What Took You So Long?" (2001) and "Take My Breath Away" (2001), all of which were top five hits. "We're Not Gonna Sleep Tonight" also peaked at number 27 on the Romanian Top 100.

== Music video ==
A music video for "We're Not Gonna Sleep Tonight" was directed by Phil Griffin.

== Track listings ==
UK CD single
| No. | Title | Writer(s) | Producer(s) | Length |
|---|---|---|---|---|
| 1. | "We're Not Gonna Sleep Tonight" (single mix) | Emma Bunton; Rhett Lawrence | Lawrence; Andy Wright^{[a]} | 3:10 |
| 2. | "We're Not Gonna Sleep Tonight" (3AM mix) | Bunton; Lawrence | Lawrence; 3AM^{[a]}; Wright^{[b]} | 6:38 |
| 3. | "Let Your Baby Show You How to Move" | Bunton; Lawrence | Lawrence | 3:07 |

UK DVD single
| No. | Title | Length |
|---|---|---|
| 1. | "Emma introduces her new video" | 0:30 |
| 2. | "We're Not Gonna Sleep Tonight" (radio mix video) | 3:10 |
| 3. | "Let Your Baby Show You How to Move" (audio with picture gallery) | 3:07 |
| 4. | "We're Not Gonna Sleep Tonight" (audio with photo gallery) | 3:23 |
| 5. | "Emma talks about making her video" | 0:30 |
| 6. | "Emma talks about making her video" | 0:30 |
| 7. | "Emma talks about making her video" | 0:30 |

Notes

- ^{^[a]} signifies an additional producer
- ^{^[b]} signifies a vocal producer

== Credits and personnel ==
Credits are taken from the UK CD single liner notes and A Girl Like Me booklet.

Studio

- Recorded and mixed at Sound Gallery Studios (Los Angeles, California)

Personnel

- Jason Bonilla – recording engineer
- Emma Bunton – writing, vocals
- Will Catterson – recording engineer
- Dylan "JD" Dresdow – mixing engineer
- Rhett Lawrence – guitar, engineer, writing, production
- Evan Lloyd – assistant engineer
- Dave Pensado – mixing engineer
- Ramone Stagnaro – guitar
- Andy Wright – additional producer (edit)

== Charts ==
Weekly chart performance for "We're Not Gonna Sleep Tonight"
| Chart (2001–2002) | Peak position |
|---|---|
| Romania (Romanian Top 100) | 27 |
| Scotland Singles (Official Charts) | 27 |
| UK Singles (Official Charts) | 20 |
