= I'll Be There (Emma Bunton song) =

2004 single by Emma Bunton

Single by Emma Bunton

from the album Free Me
- B-side: "Takin’ It Easy"; "So Long"
- Released: 26 January 2004
- Studio: Sarm West (London)
- Length: 3:23
- Label: 19; Universal
- Songwriters: Emma Bunton; Hélène Muddiman; Mike Peden
- Producer: Mike Peden

Emma Bunton singles chronology
"Maybe" (2003)	"I'll Be There" (2004)	"Crickets Sing for Anamaria" (2004)

Audio sample
- file; help

Licensed audio
- "I'll Be There" on YouTube

"I'll Be There" is a song by English singer Emma Bunton from her second solo studio album, Free Me (2004). It was written by Bunton along with Hélène Muddiman and producer Mike Peden, while production was overseen by the latter. the song was released by 19 Recordings and Universal Records on 26 January 2004 as the album's third single, debuting and peaking at number 7 on the UK Singles Chart.

== Commercial performance ==
Released on 26 January 2004 in the United Kingdom, "I'll Be There" debuted and peaked at number seven on the UK Singles Chart in the week ending 7 February 2004, becoming Bunton's sixth non-consecutive top ten single. It also reached number ten on the Scottish Singles Chart.

== Music video ==
A black-and-white music video for "I'll Be There," directed by Giuseppe Capotondi, was shot in Paris.

== Track listings ==
UK CD 1
No.	Title	Writer(s)	Producer(s)	Length
1.	"I'll Be There"	Emma Bunton; Hélène Muddiman; Mike Peden	Peden	3:23
2.	"Takin’ It Easy"	Bunton; Tim Lever; Mike Percy	Lever; Percy	3:58
3.	"I'll Be There" (Europa XL vocal mix)	Bunton; Muddiman; Peden	Peden; Europa XL^{[a]}	5:39
4.	"I'll Be There" (Bimbo Jones vocal mix)	Bunton; Muddiman; Peden	Peden; Lee Dagger^{[a]}; Marc JB^{[a]}	6:58
5.	"I'll Be There" (music video)

UK CD 2
No.	Title	Writer(s)	Producer(s)	Length
1.	"I'll Be There"	Bunton; Muddiman; Peden	Peden	3:23
2.	"So Long"	Bunton; Richard Stannard; Julian Gallagher; Pete Davis; Dave Morgan	Biffco	3:53

Notes

- ^{^[a]} signifies an additional producer

== Personnel ==
Personnel are adapted from the liner notes of Free Me.

- Emma Bunton – vocals, songwriting
- Richard Dowling – mastering
- Martin Hayles – keyboards, recording
- Nick Ingman – orchestra arrangement, orchestra conducting
- Isobel Griffiths Ltd – orchestra contractor
- Hélène Muddiman – backing vocals, songwriting
- Mike Peden – keyboards, mixing, production, songwriting
- Charlie Russell – live drums, programming
- Gavyn Wright – orchestra leader

== Charts ==
=== Weekly charts ===
Weekly chart performance for "I'll Be There"
Chart (2004)	Peak position
European Hot 100 Singles (Billboard)	29
Ireland (IRMA)	42
Scotland Singles (OCC)	10
UK Singles (OCC)	7

=== Year-end charts ===
Year-end chart performance for "I'll Be There"
Chart (2004)	Position
UK Singles (OCC)	153

== Release history ==
Release dates and formats for "I'll Be There"
Region	Date	Format(s)	Label(s)	Ref.
Germany	26 January 2004	CD single	19; Polydor	
United Kingdom	26 January 2004	CD single	19; Polydor	
