= Take My Breath Away (Emma Bunton song) =

2001 single by Emma Bunton

Single by Emma Bunton

from the album A Girl Like Me
- B-side: "Close Encounter"; "Invincible"
- Released: 27 August 2001
- Studio: Rokstone (London, England)
- Length: 3:35 (album version); 3:38 (single mix)
- Label: Virgin
- Songwriters: Emma Bunton; Steve Mac; Wayne Hector
- Producer: Steve Mac

Emma Bunton singles chronology
"What Took You So Long?" (2001)	"Take My Breath Away" (2001)	"We're Not Gonna Sleep Tonight" (2001)

Music video
- "Take My Breath Away" on YouTube

"Take My Breath Away" is a song by English singer Emma Bunton. It was written by Bunton, Steve Mac, and Wayne Hector for her debut solo album, A Girl Like Me (2001), while production was helmed by Mac. The song was released by Virgin Records on 27 August 2001 as the album's second single. It debuted and peaked at number five on the UK Singles Chart and became a top-20 hit in Italy. The accompanying music video was shot in Sardinia, Italy, and was directed by Greg Masuak.

== Critical reception ==
"Take My Breath Away" earned generally positive reviews from music critics. NME ranked the song among its parent album's "several lovely moments" and described it as "pure summer in a bottle." AllMusic editor Stewart Mason noted that "the assertive title track has the relaxed groove and organic feel of a classic early disco single.

== Commercial performance ==
The song was issued as the album's second single on 27 August 2001. It debuted and peaked at number five on the UK Singles Chart in the week ending 8 September 2001, becoming Bunton's third consecutive solo top five hit after "What I Am" (1999) and "What Took You So Long?."

== Music video ==
A music video for "Take My Breath Away" was directed by Greg Masuak. Filmed in mid-2001 on the Italian island of Sardinia, the video features Bunton in a variety of beauty shots taken on the beach.

== Track listings ==
UK CD and cassette single
No.	Title	Writer(s)	Producer(s)	Length
1.	"Take My Breath Away" (single mix)	Emma Bunton; Steve Mac; Wayne Hector	Mac	3:38
2.	"Close Encounter"	Bunton; Andrew Frampton; Chris Braide	Frampton	3:32
3.	"Take My Breath Away" (Tin Tin Out mix)	Bunton; Mac; Hector	Mac; Tin Tin Out^{[a]}	2:36

European CD single
No.	Title	Writer(s)	Producer(s)	Length
1.	"Take My Breath Away" (single mix)	Bunton; Mac; Hector	Mac	3:38
2.	"Close Encounter"	Bunton; Frampton; Braide	Frampton	3:32

UK DVD single
No.	Title	Writer(s)	Producer(s)	Length
1.	"Emma introduces her new video"			0:24
2.	"Take My Breath Away" (single mix – video)	Bunton; Mac; Hector	Mac	3:35
3.	"Emma introduces the song "Invincible"" (video)			0:19
4.	"Invincible" (audio with photo gallery)	Bryan Adams; Phil Thornalley	Adams; Thornalley	3:01
5.	"Emma introduces the Tin Tin Out mix" (video)			0:26
6.	"Take My Breath Away" (Tin Tin Out mix – audio with photo gallery)	Bunton; Mac; Hector	Mac; Tin Tin Out^{[a]}	2:36
7.	"Message from Emma" (video)			0:25

Notes

- ^{^[a]} signifies an additional producer

== Credits and personnel ==
Credits are taken from the UK CD single liner notes and A Girl Like Me booklet.

Studio

- Recorded and mixed at Rokstone Studios (London, England)

Personnel

- Emma Bunton – writing, vocals
- Steve Mac – writing, production, arrangement
- Wayne Hector – writing
- Mark "Spike" Stent – mixing
- Paul "P Dub" Walton – mixing engineer
- Chris Laws – engineering
- Ian Ross – artwork design
- Sam Harris – photography

== Charts ==
=== Weekly charts ===
Weekly chart performance for "Take My Breath Away"
Chart (2001)	Peak position
Australia (ARIA)	48
Belgium (Ultratip Bubbling Under Flanders)	8
Belgium (Ultratip Bubbling Under Wallonia)	7
Europe (Eurochart Hot 100)	28
Ireland (IRMA)	26
Italy (FIMI)	16
Scottish Singles Sales (Official Charts)	6
Switzerland (Schweizer Hitparade)	89
UK Singles (Official Charts)	5

=== Year-end charts ===
Year-end chart performance for "Take My Breath Away"
Chart (2001)	Position
UK Singles (OCC)	151

== Release history ==
Release dates and formats for "Take My Breath Away"
Region	Date	Format(s)	Label(s)	Ref.
United Kingdom	27 August 2001	CD; cassette; DVD	Virgin	
Australia	22 October 2001	CD	Virgin	
