= A Girl Like Me (Emma Bunton album) =

2001 album by Emma Bunton

Studio album by Emma Bunton
- Released: 16 April 2001
- Recorded: July 1999 – October 2000
- Studios: Biffco (Dublin) (Note: Tracks 1, 4 and 9); Rokstone (London) (Note: Track 2); The Loft (Bronxville, New York) (Note: Tracks 3, 5 and 11); Polar (Stockholm) (Note: Strings on track 3); Olympic (London) (Note: Tracks 6 and 8); Boundary Row (London) (Note: Track 7); Sound Gallery (Los Angeles) (Note: Track 10); Sarm West (London) (Note: Track 12)
- Genre: Pop
- Length: 45:40
- Label: Virgin
- Producers: Andrew Frampton; Julian Gallagher; Rhett Lawrence; Steve Mac; Evan Rogers; Richard "Biff" Stannard; Carl Sturken; Tin Tin Out

Emma Bunton chronology
A Girl Like Me (2001)	Free Me (2004)

Singles from A Girl Like Me
- 1. "What Took You So Long?" Released: 2 April 2001; 2. "Take My Breath Away" Released: 27 August 2001; 3. "We're Not Gonna Sleep Tonight" Released: 10 December 2001

A Girl Like Me is the debut solo studio album by English singer Emma Bunton, released on 16 April 2001 by Virgin Records. Following the release of the Spice Girls' third studio album, Forever (2000), the group announced that they were beginning an indefinite hiatus and would be concentrating on their solo careers in regards to their foreseeable future. Recording sessions for Bunton's first solo album took place from July 1999 to October 2000 at several recording studios.

The album received mixed reviews, with critics praising its catchy pop songs and Bunton's growth from her Baby Spice image, but some criticized its generic production and lightweight lyrics. It debuted at number four on the UK Albums Chart, selling 21,500 copies in its first week and earning a BPI gold certification. The album also saw moderate international success, reaching the top 25 in New Zealand and Denmark, and number 86 in Australia, where it later went gold, with worldwide sales around 500,000 copies.

A Girl Like Me produced three singles: "What Took You So Long?", which topped the charts in the United Kingdom and New Zealand, "Take My Breath Away", and "We're Not Gonna Sleep Tonight". It also includes Bunton's collaboration with Tin Tin Out, a cover of "What I Am" by Edie Brickell & New Bohemians. Following the album's release cycle and its mixed commercial performance, Bunton departed from Virgin Records and signed with 19 Recordings to release her next projects.

== Background ==
In 2000, after the release of the Spice Girls' comeback single, a double A-side of "Holler"/"Let Love Lead The Way" and the third studio album, Forever, which charted at number two in the UK, the Spice Girls stopped recording, concentrating on their solo careers in regards to their foreseeable future. As with her band members, Bunton was offered to remain with Virgin Records to produce and release her solo material with the band's label.

== Production ==
Production of A Girl Like Me occurred over an extended period and took place across multiple international recording locations, including Miami, Los Angeles, New York, Dublin, London, and Sweden. The album was developed in collaboration with a range of producers, several of whom Bunton had not previously worked with; including London-based producer Andrew Frampton and the New York–based production duo Carl Sturken and Evan Rogers. Bunton also continued her longstanding professional relationships with Rodney "Darkchild" Jerkins and Richard Stannard, two key collaborators during her tenure with the Spice Girls. Many recording sessions were structured around a fully collaborative model, with songwriting and production evolving simultaneously rather than being built upon pre-existing instrumental material.

Throughout the production process, Bunton maintained a high degree of creative involvement and oversight. She generally wrote the album's lyrics herself and played an active role in shaping arrangements and production decisions. As a result, she adopted a hands-on role in the studio, ensuring that creative changes were made collaboratively and with her direct input. While acknowledging the challenges and vulnerability associated with releasing self-written material independently, she characterised the experience as creatively liberating, allowing for greater experimentation and autonomy within the studio environment. At the same time, she emphasised the importance of collaboration, noting that working closely with producers and maintaining professional relationships remained central to her creative practice. Bunton has indicated that working in diverse geographical and cultural contexts contributed to the album's stylistic breadth, exposing her to varied studio practices and creative environments.

Stylistically, A Girl Like Me was conceived as a pop album with a broad emotional and demographic appeal. While rooted primarily in pop, the record incorporates elements of R&B and dance music, alongside melodic structures emphasising accessibility and sentiment. Bunton has described a deliberate focus on emotional resonance, aiming to create material that could be relatable to listeners across age groups. The album's lyrical themes centre on interpersonal relationships, encompassing not only romantic narratives but also familial bonds and friendships, including experiences of closeness, estrangement, and emotional growth.

== Promotion ==
A Girl Like Me was preceded by lead single "What Took You So Long?." A pop rock song about men taking longer than women to realise they are in love, it was commercially released in the United Kingdom on 2 April 2001, in two single versions. Initial reviews of "What Took You So Long?" from critics were mostly positive, many of whom praised the song's melody and Bunton's vocal delivery. It debuted at the top of the UK Singles Chart, with sales of 76,000 copies. This made Bunton the fourth member of the Spice Girls to top the chart as a solo artist. It spent two weeks at number one and three weeks inside the top 10, ending at the 41st position on the 2001 year-end chart. The song was certified silver by the British Phonographic Industry (BPI) in April 2001.

"Take My Breath Away," co-written and produced by Steve Mac, was issued as the album's second single on 27 August 2001. It reached number five on the UK Singles Chart and became a top twenty hit in Italy. Critical reception towards the song was fairly positive, with NME describing it as "pure summer in a bottle." "We're Not Gonna Sleep Tonight," co-written and produced by Rhett Lawrence, was released as the album's third and final single on 10 December 2001. It debuted and peaked at number 20 on the UK Singles Chart, becoming the album's lowest-peaking single.

== Critical reception ==
Professional ratings
Review scores
Source	Rating
AllMusic	3/5 stars
Birmingham Post	4/5 stars
Dotmusic	3/5 stars
Chart Attack	2.5/5 stars
The Guardian	2/5 stars
MTV Asia	7/10
NME	6/10

A Girl Like Me garnered a lukewarm reception from music critics, who praised its catchy songs, but were critical of its generic nature. Deborah J. Elliot of Musical Discoveries was positive about the album, calling it a "very nice listen" that showed Bunton "growing out of her pig tails from the days of the Spice Girls, into a grown woman." Ros Dodd, writing for the Birmingham Post, characterised A Girl Like Me as a tuneful and enjoyable pop debut, praising its strong melodies and upbeat energy. She highlighted "What Took You So Long?" and album tracks such as "A World Without You" and "Spell It Out" as standout moments, noting that while the lyrics were lightweight and Bunton's voice not especially distinctive, the album was consistently catchy. Dodd was more critical of the cover "Sunshine on a Rainy Day", which she felt added little to the record. Ian Wade of Dotmusic was also positive towards the album, praising tracks such as the lead single, "Better Be Careful", and "A World Without You", though he was critical of the more R&B-oriented material. He ultimately concluded that A Girl Like Me was a thoroughly likeable release that marked a move away from Bunton's "Baby Spice" image.

Stewart Mason of AllMusic offered a more mixed assessment, feeling that Bunton's singing voice lacked depth but worked effectively with the album's polished and addictive pop songs. He concluded that it "isn't an album for the ages, but it's better than ‘not bad.'" Timothy Park of NME gave the album a rating of 6/10, praising tracks such as "Take My Breath Away" and "We're Not Gonna Sleep Tonight" but concluding that while the album was sweet, it lacked edge. Erik Missio of Chart Attack felt that the album showed promise but was ultimately disappointing due to its attempts to emulate the Spice Girls' sound. Stephen Robinson of Hot Press criticised the album for being overly sweet and unoriginal in its borrowing from other genres, dismissing it as "another album to chuck aboard the pop blandwagon." Caroline Sullivan of The Guardian was among the most critical, describing the album as "passably interesting" and arguing that Bunton's "girlishly mediocre voice" was poorly served by what she characterised as bland, formulaic songwriting. In a retrospective article about the album, Quentin Harrison of Albumism wrote: "Behind Bunton’s ever-sunny disposition is the mind of a mature songstress capable of operating comfortably within the confines of a superpower like the Spice Girls or breaking out by herself. Regarding the latter point, it all began with A Girl Like Me, an understated blueprint to the fetching adult pop approach that Bunton wielded to consolidate a staunch, cross-generational, record buying base over the course of her next three albums."

== Commercial performance ==
A Girl Like Me debuted and peaked at number four on the UK Albums Chart in the week ending 28 April 2001, selling 21,694 copies in its first week. The album went on to sell approximately 127,000 copies in the United Kingdom and was certified gold by the British Phonographic Industry (BPI) on 7 September 2001, denoting shipments in excess of 100,000 units. It ranked as the 147th best-selling album in the country for 2001.

Outside the United Kingdom, A Girl Like Me achieved modest chart success. It peaked at number six on the Scottish Albums Chart, reached number 21 in New Zealand, number 23 in both Denmark and on the European Albums chart, and number 38 in Finland. In Australia, the album charted at number 86; however, it was later certified gold, indicating strong catalogue sales despite its low peak position. Despite these figures, overall sales of about 500,000 units were considered underwhelming, ultimately leading to Bunton being dropped by Virgin Records in 2002.

== Track listing ==
A Girl Like Me track listing
No.	Title	Writer(s)	Producer(s)	Length
1.	"What Took You So Long?"	Bunton; Richard Stannard; Julian Gallagher; Martin Harrington; John Themis; Dave Morgan	Stannard; Gallagher	3:59
2.	"Take My Breath Away"	Bunton; Steve Mac; Wayne Hector	Mac	3:34
3.	"A World Without You"	Bunton; Evan Rogers; Carl Sturken	Rogers; Sturken	4:53
4.	"High on Love"	Bunton; Stannard; Gallagher; Harrington; Ash Howes; Sharon Murphy	Stannard; Gallagher	3:49
5.	"A Girl Like Me"	Bunton; Rogers; Sturken	Rogers; Sturken; StoneBridge^{[a]}	4:01
6.	"Spell It O.U.T."	Bunton; Andrew Frampton; Chris Braide	Frampton	3:12
7.	"Sunshine on a Rainy Day"	Martin Glover; Zoë	Tin Tin Out	4:17
8.	"Been There, Done That"	Bunton; Frampton; Braide	Frampton	3:05
9.	"Better Be Careful"	Bunton; Stannard; Gallagher; Harrington; Howes	Stannard; Gallagher	3:19
10.	"We're Not Gonna Sleep Tonight"	Bunton; Rhett Lawrence	Lawrence	3:23
11.	"She Was a Friend of Mine"	Bunton; Rogers; Sturken	Rogers; Sturken	3:34
12.	"What I Am" (with Tin Tin Out)	Kenny Withrow; Edie Brickell	Tin Tin Out	4:34
Total length:				45:40

=== Notes ===
- ^{^[a]} signifies an additional producer

== Personnel ==
Credits adapted from the liner notes of A Girl Like Me.

=== Musicians ===
- Emma Bunton – vocals
- Ash Howes – programming (tracks 1, 4)
- Steve Mac – arrangement (track 2)
- Ulf Forsberg – string concertmaster (track 3)
- Henrik Janson – string arrangements, string conducting (track 3)
- Ulf Janson – string arrangements, string conducting (track 3)
- Simon Hale – string arrangements (tracks 4, 9); brass arrangements (track 9)
- StoneBridge – keyboards (track 5)
- Andrew Frampton – arrangement, string arrangements (track 6)
- Chris Braide – arrangement (tracks 6, 8)
- Nick Ingman – string arrangements (track 6)
- Lawrence Johnson – additional vocal arrangement (track 7)
- Rhett Lawrence – arrangement, programming, guitar (track 10)
- Ramón Stagnaro – guitar (track 10)

=== Technical ===
- Richard "Biff" Stannard – production (tracks 1, 4, 9)
- Julian Gallagher – production (tracks 1, 4, 9)
- Ash Howes – recording (tracks 1, 4, 9); mixing (track 4); engineering (tracks 4, 9)
- Alvin Sweeney – additional recording, Pro Tools (track 1); additional engineering (tracks 4, 9)
- Mark "Spike" Stent – mixing (track 1)
- Jan "Stan" Kybert – mix engineering, Pro Tools (track 1)
- Matt Fields – mixing assistance (track 1)
- Steve Mac – production, mixing (track 2)
- Chris Laws – engineering (track 2)
- Evan Rogers – production (tracks 3, 5, 11)
- Carl Sturken – production (tracks 3, 5, 11)
- Al Hemberger – engineering (tracks 3, 5, 11)
- Mick Guzauski – mixing (track 3)
- Tom Bender – mixing assistance (track 3)
- Stefan Boman – string engineering (track 3)
- StoneBridge – additional production, mixing (track 5)
- Andrew Frampton – production (tracks 6, 8)
- Daniel Frampton – engineering (tracks 6, 8)
- Brad Gilderman – mixing (tracks 6, 8, 11)
- Steve Price – string recording (track 6)
- Tin Tin Out – production, mixing (tracks 7, 12)
- Rhett Lawrence – production, recording engineering, mixing (track 10)
- Jason Bonilla – recording engineering (track 10)
- Will Catterson – recording engineering (track 10)
- Evan Lloyd – engineering assistance (track 10)
- Dave "Hard Drive" Pensado – mixing (track 10)
- Dylan "3D" Dresdow – mixing (track 10)

=== Artwork ===
- Terry Richardson – photography
- Ian Ross – design
- Ruth Rowland – lettering

== Charts ==
=== Weekly charts ===
Weekly chart performance for A Girl Like Me
Chart (2001)	Peak position
Australian Albums (ARIA)	86
Austrian Albums (Ö3 Austria)	75
Danish Albums (Hitlisten)	23
European Albums (Music & Media)	23
Finnish Albums (Suomen virallinen lista)	38
French Albums (SNEP)	79
German Albums (Offizielle Top 100)	67
Irish Albums (IRMA)	55
New Zealand Albums (RMNZ)	21
Scottish Albums (Official Charts)	6
UK Albums (Official Charts)	4

=== Year-end charts ===
Year-end chart performance for A Girl Like Me
Chart (2001)	Position
UK Albums (OCC)	147

== Certifications and sales ==
Certifications for A Girl Like Me
Region	Certification	Certified units/sales
Australia (ARIA)	Gold	35,000^{^}
United Kingdom (BPI)	Gold	127,000
Summaries
Worldwide	—	500,000
^{^} Shipments figures based on certification alone.

== Release history ==
A Girl Like Me release history
Region	Date	Label
United Kingdom	16 April 2001	Virgin
Australia	14 May 2001	EMI
