= What Took You So Long? =

2001 single by Emma Bunton

Single by Emma Bunton

from the album A Girl Like Me
- B-side: "(Hey You) Free Up Your Mind"; "Merry-Go Round"
- Released: 2 April 2001
- Studio: Biffco (Dublin, Ireland)
- Genre: Pop rock
- Length: 3:59
- Label: Virgin
- Songwriters: Emma Bunton; Richard Stannard; Julian Gallagher; Martin Harrington; John Themis; Dave Morgan
- Producers: Richard Stannard; Julian Gallagher

Emma Bunton singles chronology
"What I Am" (1999)	"What Took You So Long?" (2001)	"Take My Breath Away" (2001)

Music video
- "What Took You So Long?" on YouTube

"What Took You So Long?" a song by English singer Emma Bunton from her debut solo studio album, A Girl Like Me (2001). The song was written by Bunton, Richard Stannard, Julian Gallagher, Martin Harrington, John Themis and Dave Morgan, and produced by Stannard and Gallagher in Biffco Studios in Dublin, Ireland. It was released as the album's lead single in the United Kingdom on 2 April 2001, doubling as Bunton's debut solo single. A pop rock song, its sound is influenced by the work of AOR artists such as Sheryl Crow, Gabrielle, and the band Texas. For the lyrics, Bunton explained that the song is about men taking longer than women to realise they are in love, a concept inspired by her past romantic relationships. The song received mixed reviews, with many critics praising the melody and Bunton's vocal delivery, while others were critical of its production.

The song topped the UK Singles Chart for two weeks, becoming Bunton's first and only number-one, making her the fourth member of the Spice Girls to top the chart with a solo record. "What Took You So Long?" attracted moderate success in Europe and Oceania, topping the chart in New Zealand and peaking inside the top 10 in the charts of Australia, Denmark, Ireland, Italy, Portugal and Romania. An accompanying music video, directed by Greg Masuak, was shot in mid-February 2001 at the Mojave Desert near Lancaster, California. The song's promotional campaign included a series of appearances on television programmes and festivals worldwide, and it has since been regularly included on the setlists in most of her concerts and presentations.

== Background and development ==
After finishing the Spiceworld Tour in September 1998 and releasing their single "Goodbye" in December, the Spice Girls went into a hiatus period, during which the members of the group launched their solo careers and focused on their personal lives. The group resumed work on their third studio album in August 1999. (Note: Released in the UK as Forever on 6 November 2000.) Unlike her bandmates, Bunton displayed little desire to launch a music career outside of the Spice Girls, but by the end of 1999, she decided to accept an offer to collaborate with English electronic dance music duo Tin Tin Out on a cover version of Edie Brickell & New Bohemians's song "What I Am" (1988), which was released in the UK on 1 November 1999. In December, the Spice Girls performed on their UK-only tour, Christmas in Spiceworld, in London and Manchester, also showcasing songs from Forever.

The recording process for Bunton's first solo studio album A Girl Like Me took place between late 1999 and October 2000 at recording studios in London, Dublin, Stockholm, Miami, Los Angeles and New York. She worked with a mix of familiar writers and producers from the Spice Girls' recording sessions, including Richard Stannard ("Wannabe") and Rodney Jerkins ("Holler"), as well as new songwriters and record producers, such as Andrew Frampton, the duo Carl Sturken and Evan Rogers, and Rhett Lawrence. In a web chat on the group's official website, she described the sound of A Girl Like Me as a "bit of R&B; quite a lot of guitar and quite folky. It's even got some country on there." Bunton said that the album would likely include 11 or 12 tracks and the release date was planned for early 2001.

== Writing and recording ==
"What Took You So Long?" started as a backing track on an "in progress" DAT tape in Richard Stannard's Biffco Studio in Dublin, Ireland. The chords were put together by songwriter Martin Harrington, and the track was then used as the basis for a writing session. Stannard explained that the two of them worked in an "organic manner", placing a microphone in the middle of a room, then playing the chords and laying down tracks on top of them, finally singing the first ideas that came up. The melody was composed by singing over the chords, before Stannard wrote some of the lyrics on his hand from watching a film the night before. Because of his professional and personal relationship with Bunton from their previous work during the Spice Girls' sessions, the creative process was fairly simple, he commented: "With that backing track we just got writing straight away and before you knew it the words were done." Bunton finished writing the song with Stannard and songwriter/producer Julian Gallagher, and she commented about the process: "I'm very hands on with lyrics and production, I have to know what's going on. I'm really pleased with it."

The song was captured on a hard disk using Pro Tools with a Logic front end. Recording engineer Ash Howes employed an Avalon microphone amplifier and equalizer for the main vocal chain, then a UREI 1176 for dynamic range compression. For the mixing Howes used a GML Stereo equalizer, and a SSL desk for the stereo bus compressor. To create an acoustic feel, Stannard placed the sound of a Ludwig drumkit on top of a drum machine. Audio engineer Mark "Spike" Stent did the final mixing of the song at The Mix Suite, Olympic Studios in London.

== Composition and lyrics ==
"What Took You So Long?"
A 24-second sample of the song, featuring Bunton singing the chorus, with an arrangement that includes acoustic guitars, keyboards and a drumkit on top of a drum machine.

Musically, "What Took You So Long?" is a pop rock song. It is written in the key of C major, with a time signature set in common time, and moves at a fast tempo of 120 beats per minute. The song uses the sequence F_{maj7}–Am–G as the chord progression and is constructed in a verse-chorus form, with a bridge before the third chorus. It starts with an instrumental introduction that incorporates acoustic guitars, keyboards, a drumkit, and a drum machine. The arrangement include the use of handclaps to energise the sound. Some critics have noted the similarities of the song's production to the work of AOR artists such as Sheryl Crow and Texas. The melody has a Motown feel, and has been described by Bunton as "pop entwined with guitars". She cited Texas and Gabrielle as the main influences sonically. Tom Ewing from Freaky Trigger considered Bunton's vocals during the chorus to be her "strength card" that adds "enjoyable touches" to the song; an opinion shared by other writers.

Lyrically, according to Bunton, "What Took You So Long?" is about men taking longer than women to realise they are in love. In an interview with Smash Hits, she was asked if the subject of the song was her partner Jade Jones, the lead singer of the British boy band Damage. She commented, "I've only had a few boyfriends and I think they were all in my mind when I wrote it". In the book 1000 UK Number One Hits, the authors Jon Kutner and Spencer Leigh concluded that the lyrics are "about a girl who is crowing over regaining her lover", pointing out the line "What took you forever to see I'm right?"

== Release and promotion ==
In mid October 2000, while the Spice Girls were doing promotion for the release of their new single, "Holler", and Forever, Bunton talked about her then-upcoming solo album on the group's website, with a release date targeted for March 2001. In early February 2001, she revealed "What Took You So Long?" as her debut solo single set to be released in April. The song officially premiered via Bunton's newly-launched website on 14 February. Nancy Phillips, who was hired in 1998 to manage the Spice Girls' business affairs, was by early 2001, also in charge of each of the four members' individual projects, including the launch of Bunton's solo album A Girl Like Me and Melanie C's touring schedule in support of her debut album Northern Star (1999).

The promotional campaign for "What Took You So Long?" started in March 2001, but according to Phillips, the release was in danger of being overlooked by the press because of Melanie C's comments in an interview to Reuters, in which she declared not to enjoy working with the Spice Girls anymore. She commented: "We've all been very honest and all wanted to pursue solo careers. We're still linked business-wise and we're still friends, but I don't really consider myself to work as a band now." The media's focus shifted to the end of the group. Aiming to end the press stories, Phillips persuaded Melanie C to set a telephone interview on 10 March to the television programme CD:UK, where Bunton was presenting the song. In the call, she denied leaving the Spice Girls and added: "We're concentrating on solo stuff but no-one has left the band. I've not left the Spice Girls." This lessened the speculation but also prompted Phillips to end her involvement with the group, although she continued to manage the solo careers of Melanie C and Bunton.

An intensive promotional campaign in the UK that lasted a couple of weeks started at the end of March 2001, while the song entered the top 20 of the UK Airplay Chart. Bunton began with a performance at the nightclub G-A-Y and instore presentations alongside signings. She then appeared at CD:UK on 24 March, The Pepsi Chart Show and MTV Select on 29 March, Live & Kicking on 31 March, T4 on 1 April, GMTV on 4 April, and Diggit on 7 April 2001. After the release of A Girl Like Me, Bunton began promotional visits abroad. On 24 April 2001, she did an interview at TV total in Cologne, Germany, then visited Italy, France and Scandinavia. Bunton promoted the song in Singapore during May, and appeared at the television show Patrick Kielty Almost Live in Belfast on 27 July 2001.

"What Took You So Long?" was commercially released in the UK on 2 April 2001, in two single versions. The first one, an enhanced CD, included the song and two different B-sides. The first B-side, "(Hey You) Free Up Your Mind", written by Bunton with fellow Spice Girls group member Melanie C and songwriter-producer Rhett Lawrence, was originally included on the soundtrack of the English-language adaptation of Pokémon: The First Movie (1998), released in November 1999. The second one, "Merry-Go Round", was penned by Bunton with songwriting and production duo Carl Sturken and Evan Rogers. In addition, the CD contains a picture gallery and the song's music video and lyrics. The second version was a cassette single, featuring the song and the two B-sides.

== Critical reception ==
Upon release, initial reviews of "What Took You So Long?" from critics were mostly positive, many of whom praised the song's melody and Bunton's vocal delivery. Peter Robinson of NME dismissed the R&B direction of Forever and was pleased that she worked with Stannard on the track, labelling it "a solo Spice single which actually sounds like a solo single". Chart Attack's writer Erik Missio had a similar opinion; he praised the song for not sounding like a "Spice cover". In a review of the single, Gary Crossing of Dotmusic considered Bunton's image change a "cynical marketing ploy" but called the song's chorus "irresistible" and lauded it for being a "perfectly fine strummalong pop song". Ian Wade from the same publication, characterized the song as a "Shania-for-the-tweens", singling it out as one of A Girl Like Me's highlights while calling the song a "birrova standout". Smash Hits' Caroline Millington chose it as the issue's single of the fortnight, calling the song a "catchy little number" while describing Bunton's singing as "absolutely lurving". The staff of the Evening Mail described it as "completely inoffensive" and added that the song matched with Bunton's "fragile, little girl vocals". Dale Price of the Drowned in Sound named the song the best solo track released by any of the Spice Girls, commenting that it "comes as a complete bolt from the blue". He described the instrumental introduction as "Chris Isaak making a concerted effort to go pop", and complimented the vocals and the production.

Some reviewers had mixed opinions about the production. Writing for Stylus Magazine, Dom Passantino was critical of the song. He commented that to have a number one, Bunton had to "channel the spirit of Lene Marlin from a mere two years prior"; he disregarded the song as a quick way for her to stay relevant "so nobody forgot her". Graeme Virtue of the Sunday Herald described its sound as "quite melancholy", but praised the song for its catchiness. Tom Ewing from the e-zine Freaky Trigger was mixed on the track. He characterized the song as a "well-performed, pleasant AOR with a sensible heart, Sheryl Crow drawn by Posy Simmonds", but founded it uninteresting, calling the instrumentation "grim" and the production "soggy". Conversely, Cameron Adams of the Herald Sun enjoyed the use of guitars in the instrumentation, calling the song a "great pop tune". Billboard critic Jon O'Brien ranked "What Took You So Long?" third on the magazine's 2018 list of "The Spice Girls' 20 Best Solo Singles"; he called it "one of the simplest" solo Spice Girls singles and considered the production to be "tailor-made for drive-time radio". Lauren Murphy placed it second on Entertainment.ie's 2019 list of "The 10 best Spice Girls solo songs". She enjoyed the song's melody and Bunton's vocals, describing it as "a wistful little pop tune", and she considered the song "stood the test of time".

== Commercial performance ==
"What Took You So Long?" debuted at the top of the UK Singles Chart, with sales of 76,000 copies. This made Bunton the fourth member of the Spice Girls to top the chart as a solo artist, and also set a record for the group, as they became the act with the most individual members to have their own number one single in the country. It spent two weeks at number one, three weeks inside the top 10, nine weeks in the top 40, and 13 weeks on the chart in total, ending at the 41st position on the 2001 year-end chart. The song was certified silver by the British Phonographic Industry (BPI) in the UK in April 2001. As of January 2021, it has sold 295,000 copies in the country.

"What Took You So Long?" was moderately successful in the rest of Europe. It reached number six on the Eurochart Hot 100, peaked inside the top 10 in the singles chart of Denmark, Ireland, Italy, Portugal, and Romania, and inside the top 20 in Spain and Sweden. The song performed better on radio across the continent, reaching the third position of the European Radio Top 50 chart, topping the airplay chart in Italy, peaking inside the top 10 in the German-speaking countries, Scandinavia, and the UK; and it further reached the top 20 in France, Hungary and Poland.

The song debuted on the ARIA Singles Chart at number 48 on 22 April 2001 and peaked at number 10 on 1 July. It lasted for 16 weeks on the chart, ended at the 63rd position on the year-end chart, and was certified gold by the Australian Recording Industry Association (ARIA) for selling 35,000 units in 2001. The song debuted on the Official New Zealand Music Chart at number 50 on 6 May 2001 and eight weeks later, it topped the chart. The song spent eight weeks in the top 10, 14 inside the top 20, lasted for 22 weeks on the chart, and ended at the 15th position on the year-end chart for 2001.

== Music video ==
A scene of the music video, featuring Bunton in the Mojave Desert waiting for her love interest to arrive.

The music video for "What Took You So Long?" was directed by Greg Masuak, who previously worked with Bunton on the video for "What I Am"–her 1999 collaboration with Tin Tin Out, as well as the Spice Girls' videos for "Who Do You Think You Are" (1997) and "Let Love Lead the Way" (2000). It was filmed in mid-February 2001 in the Mojave Desert near Lancaster, California. Bunton described the video as "very natural", and in an interview, she commented about the concept: "I knew I wanted the video to be quite 'deserty', waiting on the side of the road, what took him so long kind of thing."

The video starts with Bunton walking down an empty road through the desert, dressed in a long coat while carrying a suitcase, presumably waiting for her love interest to arrive. It is implied that a few days go by, as the video alternates between scenes showing her bowling with glass bottles, standing outside an abandoned cottage, starting a campfire during the night, and playing with butterflies and dogs that resemble wolves. Towards the end of the clip, a man appears driving a pickup truck, with Bunton seducing him and getting on. At the end, as they are driving, she throws him out of the truck in the middle of the desert and waves goodbye to him.

== Live performances ==
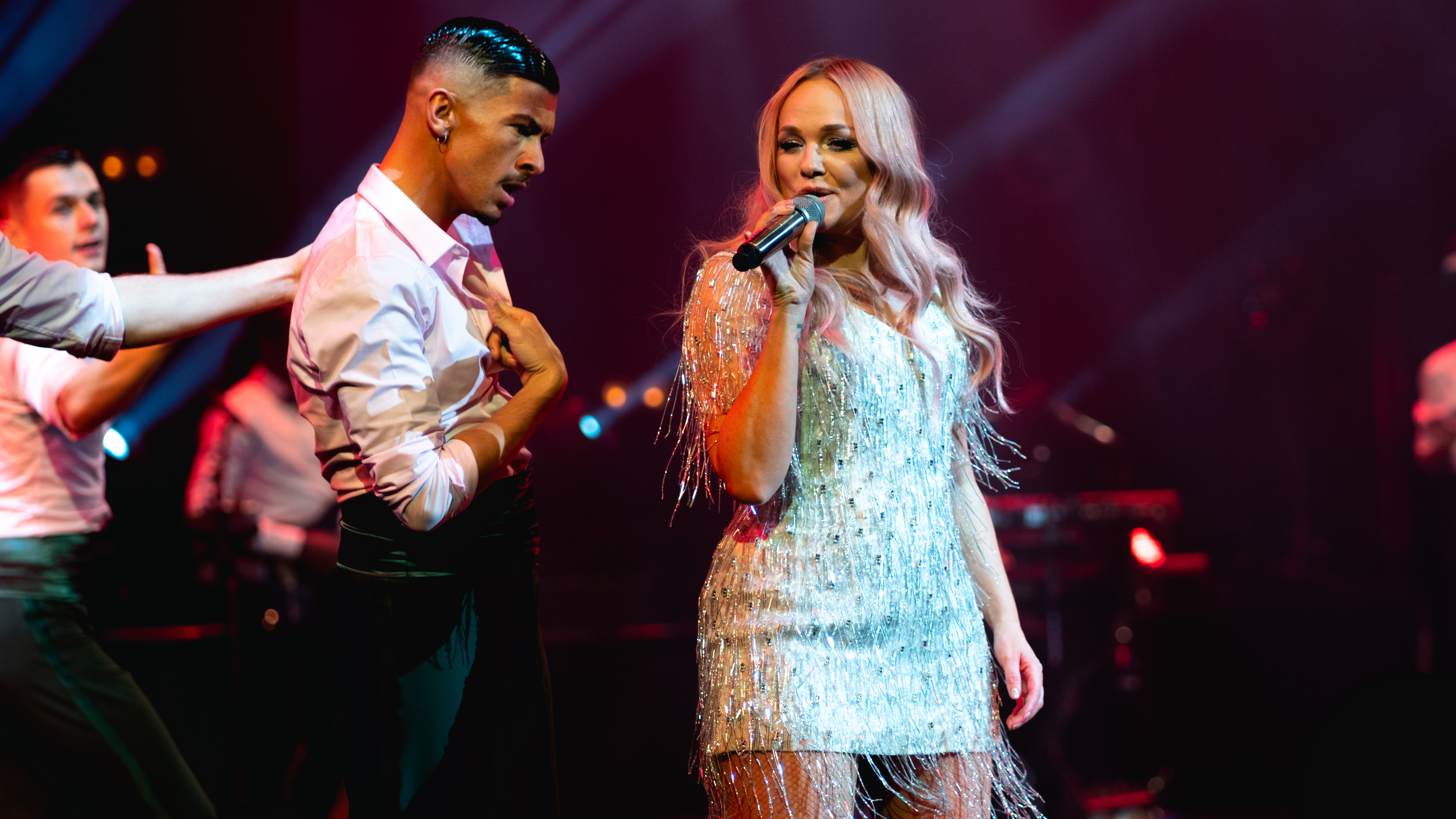
Emma Bunton performing the song during her Christmas show at the Royal Albert Hall in London, in December 2019.

Bunton has performed "What Took You So Long?" many times on British television, including shows such as CD:UK and Live & Kicking. Through the years, the song has been part of the setlists in most of her concerts and presentations. While promoting the single and A Girl Like Me in late April 2001, Bunton performed it for Sveriges Radio P3's Ketchup Party in Stockholm, Sweden; and for The Voice radio station at Park Café in Copenhagen, Denmark. In June, she delivered a performance at the 2001 Festivalbar held in Padua, Italy.

Throughout mid-2001, Bunton made several presentations at festivals across the UK. She performed the song on 9 June at Power in the Park in Southampton, on 24 June at BBC Radio 1's One Big Sunday in Manchester, on 8 July at Party in the Park in London, and 9 August at the Ashton Court Festival in Bristol. In November 2001, she performed it at the Rumba Festival in Melbourne and Sydney in Australia.

On 6 December 2019, Bunton delivered her first solo show in over a decade at the Royal Albert Hall in London. The concert was a special one-off Christmas show that featured her performing well known Christmas covers, Spice Girls' songs, as well as many of her solo hits, including "What Took You So Long?".

== Formats and track listings ==
UK, Australian, European, and Thai CD

1. "What Took You So Long?" – 3:59
2. "(Hey You) Free Up Your Mind" – 3:21
3. "Merry-Go Round" – 3:54
4. "What Took You So Long?" (Video)

European 2-track and French CD

1. "What Took You So Long?" – 3:59
2. "Merry-Go Round" – 3:54

UK and New Zealand cassette (Side 2 is the same as Side 1)

1. "What Took You So Long?" – 3:59
2. "(Hey You) Free Up Your Mind" – 3:21
3. "Merry-Go Round" – 3:54

== Credits and personnel ==
Credits of "What Took You So Long?" are adapted from the booklet of A Girl Like Me:

- Emma Bunton – lyrics, vocals
- Richard Stannard – lyrics, production
- Julian Gallagher – lyrics, production
- Martin Harrington – lyrics
- John Themis – lyrics
- Dave Morgan – lyrics
- Ash Howes – programming, recording engineer
- Alvin Sweeney – additional recording, Pro Tools
- Mark "Spike" Stent – audio mixing
- Jan 'Stan' Kybert – mix engineering, Pro Tools
- Matt Fields – mix assistance

Credits of the B-sides, interactive element and artwork are adapted from the liner notes of the "What Took You So Long?" UK CD single:

"(Hey You) Free Up Your Mind"

- Emma Bunton – lyrics, vocals
- Melanie C – lyrics
- Rhett Lawrence – lyrics, production, audio mixing
- Dave Pensado – audio mixing

Interactive Video

- Abbey Road Interactive – enhanced element

"Merry-Go Round"

- Emma Bunton – lyrics, vocals
- Evan Rogers – lyrics, production, audio mixing
- Carl Sturken – lyrics, production, audio mixing

Artwork

- Terry Richardson – photography
- Ian Ross for BSS – design

== Charts ==
=== Weekly charts ===
Weekly chart performance for "What Took You So Long?"
Chart (2001)	Peak position
Australia (ARIA)	10
Austria (Ö3 Austria Top 40)	48
Belgium (Ultratop 50 Flanders)	22
Belgium (Ultratop 50 Wallonia)	34
Denmark (Tracklisten)	10
Europe (Eurochart Hot 100 Singles)	6
France (SNEP)	34
Germany (GfK)	36
Ireland (IRMA)	9
Italy (FIMI)	9
Netherlands (Dutch Top 40 Tipparade)	6
Netherlands (Single Top 100)	56
New Zealand (Recorded Music NZ)	1
Poland Airplay (Music & Media)	11
Portugal (AFP)	5
Romania (Romanian Top 100)	3
Scottish Singles Sales (Official Charts)	1
Spain (Promusicae)	20
Sweden (Sverigetopplistan)	14
Switzerland (Schweizer Hitparade)	25
UK Singles (Official Charts)	1

=== Year-end charts ===
2001 year-end chart performance for "What Took You So Long?"
Chart (2001)	Position
Australia (ARIA)	63
Europe (Eurochart Hot 100 Singles)	83
Ireland (IRMA)	84
New Zealand (RIANZ)	15
Romania (Romanian Top 100)	14
Sweden (Hitlistan)	85
UK Singles (OCC)	41

== Certifications and sales ==
Certifications and sales for "What Took You So Long?"
Region	Certification	Certified units/sales
Australia (ARIA)	Gold	35,000^{^}
United Kingdom (BPI)	Silver	295,000
^{^} Shipments figures based on certification alone.
