= Alexander Klaws discography =

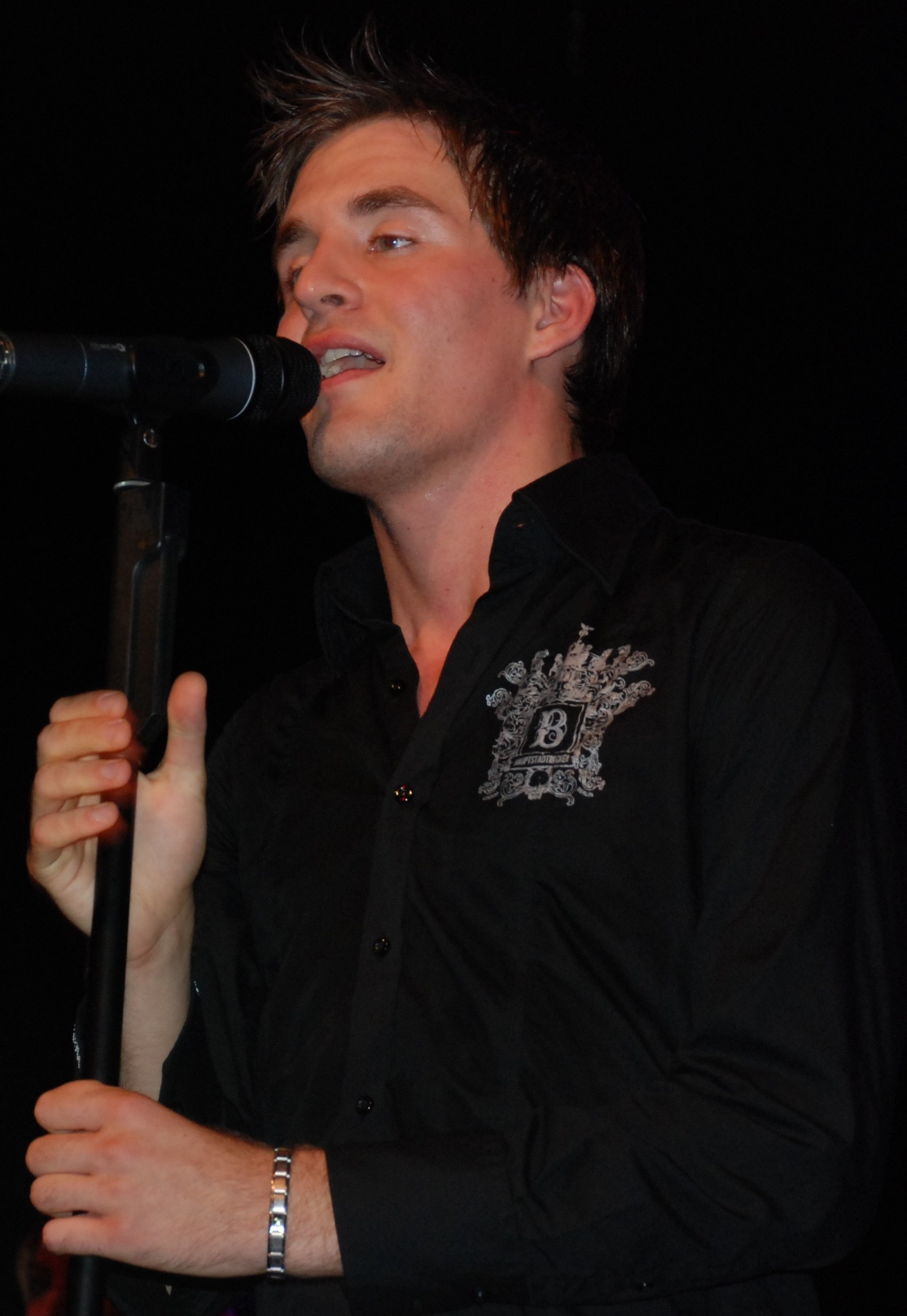
- Studio albums: 6
- Singles: 18

German recording artist Alexander Klaws has released six studio albums and fourteen singles. In 2003, he won the inaugural season of the television competition Deutschland sucht den Superstar and was immediately signed to a recording deal with Sony BMG. He made his solo chart debut in March 2003 with the "Take Me Tonight", which topped the German and Swiss singles chart and became the second biggest-selling single of the year in Germany. His debut album, Take Your Chance, was released in April 2003 and debuted atop the German albums chart. It was certified in three countries, including a gold certification by the Bundesverband Musikindustrie (BVMI). Its second single, "Stay with Me" entered the top ten in Germany. In 2004, Klaws released his second album, Here I Am. It debuted at number one in Germany and produced four singles, from which three became top five entries, including "Free Like the Wind", his second number one hit single, and "Behind the Sun", which reached number two on the German singles chart.

Trying to reinvent his own image, Clarkson decided to part ways with the DSDS management and developed a more pop rock-oriented sound for his third album, Attention! (2006). It reached the top twenty of the album charts in Austria and Germany, becoming the singer's lowest–charting album then. Attention! spawned two singles, including "All (I Ever Want)", a duet with singer Sabrina Weckerlin, and leading single "Not Like You". Following his transition into the musical theater profession and a label change, Klaws released his first German album Was willst du noch?! in 2008. A moderate success, it peaked at number 23 on the German albums chart. Für alle Zeiten, his fifth album, was released in 2011.

== Albums ==
=== Studio albums ===
List of albums, with selected chart positions and certifications
Title	Album details	Peak chart positions				Certifications
Title	Album details	GER	AUT	SWI	EU	Certifications
Take Your Chance	Released: 28 April 2003; Label: Sony BMG; Formats: CD	1	3	6	4	GER: Gold; SWI: Gold
Here I Am	Released: 12 July 2004; Label: Sony BMG; Formats: CD	1	2	6	9	
Attention!	Released: 10 March 2006; Label: Sony BMG; Formats: CD, digital download	12	19	48	43	
Was willst du noch?!	Released: 4 April 2008; Label: Sony BMG; Formats: CD, digital download	23	58	—	—	
Für alle Zeiten	Released: 23 September 2011; Label: Sony BMG; Formats: CD, digital download	46	—	—	—	
Auf die Bühne, fertig, los!	Released: 16 October 2015; Label: DEAG Music; Formats: CD, digital download	32	—	—	—	
"—" denotes releases that did not chart or were not released.

== Singles ==
List of singles, with selected chart positions and parent album
Title	Year	Peak chart positions				Album
Title	Year	GER	AUT	SWI	EU	Album
"Take Me Tonight"	2003	1	2	1	5	Take Your Chance
"Stay with Me"	2003	9	14	28	31	Take Your Chance
"Free Like the Wind"	2003	1	2	2	9	Here I Am
"Behind the Sun"	2004	2	15	18	17	Here I Am
"Sunshine After the Rain"	2004	5	19	36	28	Here I Am
"Here I Am"	2004	19	45	98	—	Here I Am
"All (I Ever Want)" (featuring Sabrina Weckerlin)	2005	12	53	—	47	Attention!
Not Like You"	2006	16	22	28	40	Attention!
"Welt"	2008	63	—	—	—	Was willst du noch?!
"Sie liebt dich"	2008	—	—	—	—	Was willst du noch?!
"Ich glaube an Liebe"	2011	—	—	—	—	Für alle Zeiten
"Das ist Leben"	2012	—	—	—	—	Für alle Zeiten
"In allen Zeiten"	2012	—	—	—	—	Für alle Zeiten
"Du gehst mir unter die Haut "	2012	—	—	—	—	Für alle Zeiten
"Himmel und Hölle"	2013	48	—	—	—	Für alle Zeiten
"Morgen explodiert die Welt"	2014	—	—	—	—	Für alle Zeiten
"Dieser Sommer"	2015	—	—	—	—	Auf die Bühne, fertig, los!
"Magnet"	2015	—	—	—	—	Auf die Bühne, fertig, los!
"—" denotes releases that did not chart or were not released.
