= Maybe (Emma Bunton song) =

2003 single by Emma Bunton

Single by Emma Bunton

from the album Free Me
- B-side: "Don't Tell Me You Love Me Anymore"
- Released: 13 October 2003
- Studio: Sarm West (London)
- Genre: Bubblegum pop
- Length: 3:45
- Label: 19; Universal
- Songwriters: Emma Bunton; Yak Bondy
- Producer: Mike Peden

Emma Bunton singles chronology
"Free Me" (2003)	"Maybe" (2003)	"I'll Be There" (2004)

Licensed audio
- "Maybe" on YouTube

"Maybe" is a song by English singer Emma Bunton from her second studio album, Free Me (2004). It was written by Bunton and Yak Bondy and produced by Mike Peden. The track was released on 13 October 2003 in the United Kingdom by 19 Recordings and Universal Records as the album's second single. "Maybe" is a bubblegum pop song with influences from bossa nova and French music were also noted into its composition. Lyrically, it deals with "missed chances and self-deception" on love.

Music critics praised its chorus and composition, with some comparing its tone to Austin Powers. The song was a commercial success in the United Kingdom, reaching number six on the UK Singles Chart; it attained moderate success internationally, charting inside the top 20 in Ireland and Italy, and within the top 40 in Hungary and Sweden. An accompanying music video was directed by Harvey & Carolyn, and was inspired by the "Rich Man's Frug" scene from the film Sweet Charity (1969). It features Bunton accompanied by her dancers while dancing against several colorful backdrops. "Maybe" was performed live on several televised shows and events at the time of its release, while being sung by Bunton in several concerts.

== Background and release ==
In 2001, Bunton released her debut solo studio album A Girl like Me; it produced the number-one single "What Took You So Long?", as well as two top 20 singles "Take My Breath Away" and "We're Not Gonna Sleep Tonight", and was certified gold by the British Phonographic Industry (BPI) for sales in excess of 100,000 copies. Following the album's release, she left her record company Virgin Records, and signed a new deal with 19 Recordings, run by Simon Fuller, who also managed the Spice Girls, of which Bunton was a member. She then started working on her follow-up album, titled Free Me; the singer described it as "very contemporary, very 60s and very classic. There's a lot of colour in there and I'm very confident of this album." The title track was chosen as the project's lead single, peaking at number five in the United Kingdom.

"Maybe" was selected as the second single from Free Me, and was released on 13 October 2003 in the United Kingdom, through 19 Recordings and Universal Records; it was later issued on 14 July 2004 in Germany, while being available on 16 August in Australia. In the United States, remixes of the song were serviced to club DJs in early 2005.

== Recording and composition ==
"Maybe" was written by Bunton in collaboration with Yak Bondy, with production being handled by Mike Peden, who also played the percussion. It was recorded at Sarm West Studios in London by Martin Hayles. Musicians on the track include Paul Turner, who played the bass; Charlie Russell, who played live drums and did the programming; Peter Gordeno, who played the keyboards; and Graham Kearns who played the guitar. Nick Ingman did the orchestra arrangement and conducting, with Isobel Griffiths Ltd being the orchestra contractor for the track. The song was mixed by Mark "Spike" Stent, and mastered at Transfermation studios in London by Richard Dowling.

"Maybe" is a bubblegum pop song which was inspired by German pornographic film soundtracks from the 1970s. According to Maurice O'Brien of Hot Press, the track "offers more proof that if there is such a genre as 'sophisticated bubblegum pop' then this girl fits right into it." Some reviewers also noted that it was influenced by bossa nova; O'Brien and a reviewer from BBC Music also observed the influence of French music into its composition. Billboard's Jon O'Brien wrote that "Maybe" transports listeners back to the time of London's Carnaby Street, with its "stylish blend of bossa nova, lounge music and Gallic pop"; Paul Cole of the Sunday Mercury noted Bunton's "jazz-tinged swing vocals", while laut.de's Michael Schuh felt that the singer's love for "old Bond string arrangements" was evident on the song. James Masterton, in his weekly UK chart commentary in Dotmusic, felt that "Maybe" resembles songs by The Cardigans. According to Spence D. from IGN, the track starts with "badadada" chants, before switching into a "propulsive pop swagger". For her part, Bunton described "Maybe" as having a "real retro feel" supported by live instruments, bongos and drums. Lyrically, it is described as a sad love song which deals with missed chances and self-deception.

== Critical reception ==
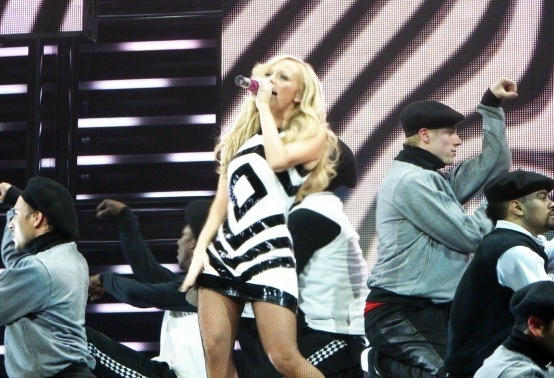
Bunton performing "Maybe" on The Return of the Spice Girls Tour in 2007

Upon its release, "Maybe" was acclaimed by music critics. A reviewer of BBC Music described the song as "a perfect pastiche of French fluffy '60s bubblegum pop", while Talia Kraines from the same website said it had a "beehive razzamatazz". Music Week staff called the track "adventurous", whose chorus was "memorably infectious", which "should see Bunton back in the Top Five." Leo Christie from New Straits Times also highlighted its "infectious" chorus, which "shows signs as a formidable pop single"; he also called "Maybe" a "sequin-gowned showstopper that other retro-driven acts might kick themselves to cover." Sam Rigby of Attitude thought the track was Bunton's masterpiece, while Justin Myers for the Official Charts Company stated that "Maybe" was "strong enough to make you want to hug your radio every time it comes on", and "there's no maybe about it; this is definitely a Pop Gem!".

Jon O'Brien from Billboard commented that "no other solo Spice track exudes as much joy", as Bunton "sounds like she’s having the time of her life" on the song. According to The Spinoff's Sam Brooks, "a few good years before Duffy ‘Mercy’d her way onto the charts, Bunton was giving us a perfect 60s pastiche" with the track, noting her "vocals so light they’re brushing the ceiling, an impenetrable wall of sound, and a wry, nearly Austin Powers-ish sense of humour." Ben Gilbert of Dotmusic wrote that although Bunton "has produced little of worth as a solo star", "Maybe" was "an absolute flaming stormer, driven by freewheeling bossanova beats, flashes of 'Austin Powers' drama, [and] hypnotic 'badaa-badaddaas'". Dorian Lynskey from The Guardian also agreed, stating that its "camp Carnaby Street romp" was "pure Austin Powers". Christopher Rosa from VH1 deemed the song as one of the key tracks from her career; while Billboard's Chuck Taylor selected it as key song from Free Me on his review for the album. For Azeem Ahmad of musicOMH, "Maybe" was "what we can expect if the Cheeky Girls release something in five or 10 years."

== Commercial performance ==
In the United Kingdom, "Maybe" debuted at number six on the UK Singles Chart for the week ending on 25 October 2003. In June 2017, it was revealed that the single was Bunton's fourth biggest selling solo single in the region. Across Europe, "Maybe" attained moderate success. The single reached number 19 on the European Hot 100 Singles, and peaked at number four in Scotland, and charted inside the top 20 in Ireland and Italy, and within the top 40 in Hungary and Sweden. It also peaked at number 56 in Australia, on the week starting on 23 August 2004. The remixes of "Maybe" also managed to reach number six on the US Dance Club Songs chart, compiled by Billboard.

== Music video ==
A still showing Bunton (center) accompanied by her dancers in the music video for "Maybe"

The music video for "Maybe" was directed by Harvey B. Brown and Carolyn Corben, and was premiered in September 2003. It was inspired by the "Rich Man's Frug" scene from the film Sweet Charity (1969); for Bunton, the 1960s decade was a source of inspiration as it had "always been in how I've dressed, down to little short dresses and knee-high boots. I'm always in heels, 'cos I'm only five foot one." The video's choreography was inspired by Bob Fosse and was handled by Nessa and Dean, who previously had conceptualised choreographies for West End musicals. Choreographer Jason Gardiner also appeared as one of the 20 dancers in the video. It starts with Bunton entering a white hall; she is wearing a white hooded trench coat, which she then removes to reveal a black dress with a pink collar and cuffs. Throughout the clip, the singer executes a choreography with her dancers behind white, green and pink backdrops.

Matthew Tharrett of Logo TV stated that "if you ever needed proof that Emma Bunton should have gone on to Broadway or the West End, look no further than the funky video" for "Maybe". According to Ben Gilbert from Dotmusic, the clip was a "masterpiece", while Billboard's Jon O'Brien commented that it was a "superbly choreographed video". Justin Myers of Official Charts Company described the visual as a "mini-movie of cocktails, dancing girls rocking obscene amounts of Twiggy-inspired lashes and eyeliner and tuxedo-sporting hunks", which was "a true feast for the eyes". Sam Rigby from Attitude wrote that the clip "gave us Baby Spice like we’d never seen her before, and it was amazing", while also noting its absence from Bunton's official Vevo channel, calling it "an even greater tragedy. Can somebody rectify this immediately, please?".

== Live performances ==
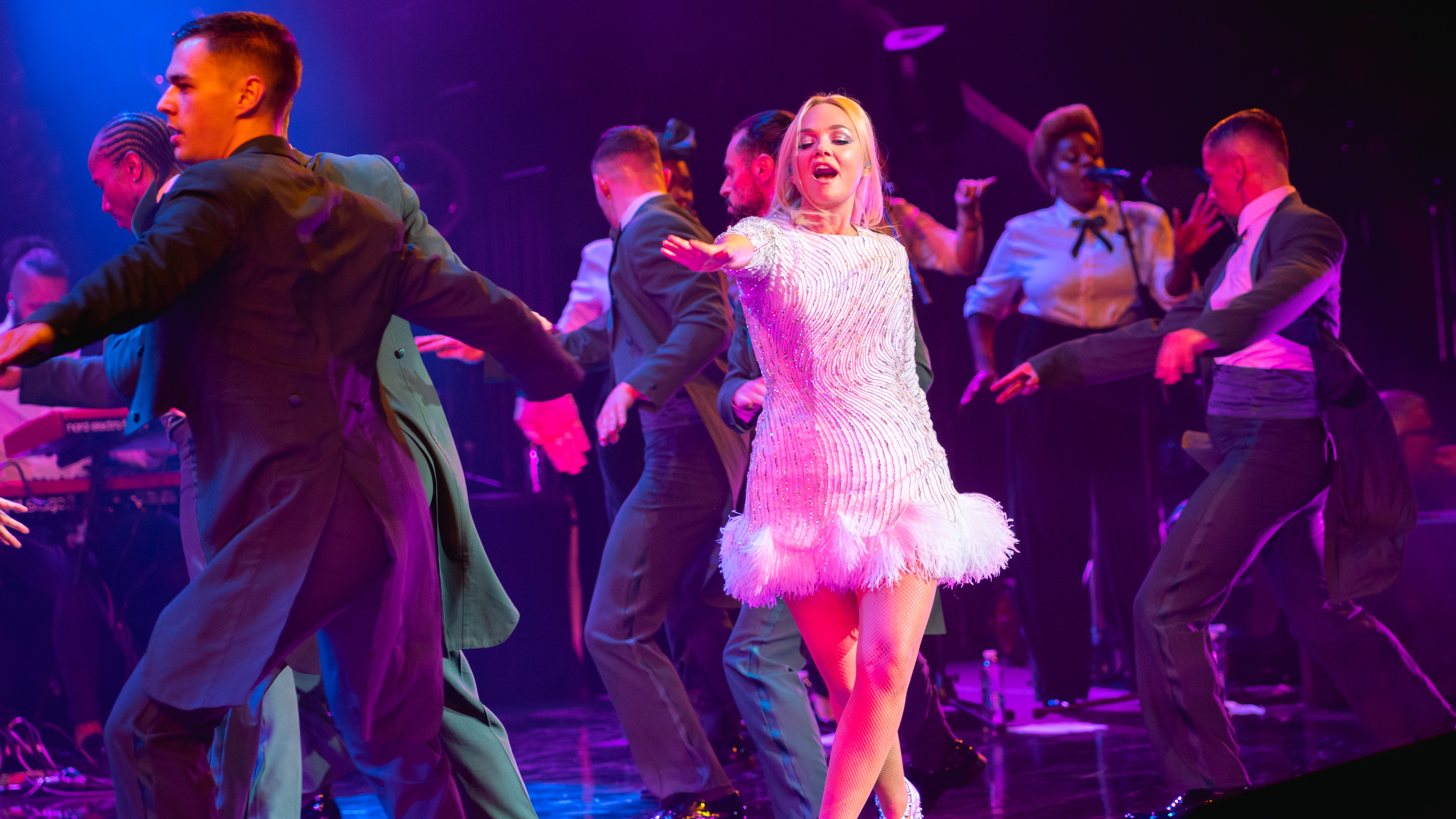
Bunton performing "Maybe" during a one-off concert at London's Royal Albert Hall in 2019

To promote "Maybe" at the time of its release, Bunton performed the track on several televised shows and events, such as the 2003 British Style Awards, CD:UK, Top of the Pops, Miss Italia nel Mondo, Deutschland Champions, and The View. The song was later performed by the singer on The Return of the Spice Girls in 2007 and 2008; during the performance, she wore an op art dress while doing the frug dance. According to David Sinclair, writing for The Times, Bunton gave a "bouncy rendition" of the track on the concerts. Joe O'Brien of Billboard noted that although "Maybe" was only Bunton’s sixth highest charting song in the United Kingdom, her performance of the song on the tour proved "how much more of an impact it made". Matthew Tharrett of Logo TV agreed, saying "the track is so hot, Emma performed it for screaming fans at the group's 2007 reunion world tour."

Years later, on 6 December 2019, Bunton made a one-off concert at Royal Albert Hall titled Emma Bunton's Christmas Party, which was her first major solo show in over a decade; she opened the show with a performance of "Maybe". In 2022, she included the track on the brief Emma Bunton and Friends tour; according to Pip Ellwood-Hughes from the Entertainment Focus, it "had the audience dancing and singing along". Regarding performing the song live, Bunton stated, "I LOVE, love, love performing ‘Maybe’. It’s just got that… I just… I can’t wait. I love that song and the reaction people have to that song, it feels special."

== Track listings ==
- UK, European, and Australian CD single
1. "Maybe" – 3:45
2. "Don't Tell Me You Love Me Anymore" – 4:01
3. "Maybe" (Bini and Martini club mix) – 8:13
4. "Maybe" (video) – 3:48
- UK cassette single
1. "Maybe" – 3:45
2. "Don't Tell Me You Love Me Anymore" – 4:01
3. "Maybe" (Bini and Martini club mix) – 8:13
- European two-track CD single
1. "Maybe" – 3:45
2. "Don't Tell Me You Love Me Anymore" – 4:01

== Credits and personnel ==
Credits adapted from the liner notes of Free Me.

- Emma Bunton – vocals, songwriting
- Yak Bondy – songwriting
- Richard Dowling – mastering
- Peter Gordeno – keyboards
- Martin Hayles – recording
- Nick Ingman – orchestra arrangement, orchestra conducting
- Isobel Griffiths Ltd – orchestra contractor
- Graham Kearns – guitar
- Mike Peden – percussion, production
- Charlie Russell – live drums, programming
- Mark "Spike" Stent – mixing
- Paul Turner – bass

== Charts ==
=== Weekly charts ===
Weekly chart performance for "Maybe"
Chart (2003–2005)	Peak position
Australia (ARIA)	56
Austria (Ö3 Austria Top 40)	63
European Hot 100 Singles (Billboard)	19
Germany (GfK)	52
Hungary (Dance Top 40)	38
Hungary (Editors' Choice Top 40)	28
Ireland (IRMA)	17
Italy (FIMI)	20
Netherlands (Dutch Top 40 Tipparade)	17
Netherlands (Single Top 100)	88
Romania (Romanian Top 100)	82
Scotland Singles (OCC)	4
Sweden (Sverigetopplistan)	33
Switzerland (Schweizer Hitparade)	93
UK Singles (OCC)	6
US Dance Club Songs (Billboard) Illicit/Bini & Martini/Almighty Mixes	6

=== Year-end charts ===
Year-end chart performance for "Maybe"
Chart (2003)	Position
UK Singles (OCC)	96

== Release history ==
Release dates and formats for "Maybe"
Region	Date	Format(s)	Label(s)	Ref.
United Kingdom	13 October 2003	CD single; cassette single	19; Universal	
Germany	12 July 2004	CD single	19; Universal	
Australia	16 August 2004	CD single	19; Universal	
