= Young Love (Jedward album) =

Studio album by Jedward
- Released: 22 June 2012
- Recorded: January–March 2012
- Genres: Pop, teen pop, synthpop
- Length: 43:03
- Labels: Universal Music Ireland
- Producers: Deekay, Dan Priddy, Duck & Paddy, Trinity, Rob Wells, Reflection Music, DBH, Matt Marston, Will Simms

Jedward chronology
Victory (2011)	Young Love (2012)	Voice of a Rebel (2019)

Singles from Young Love
- 1. "Waterline" Released: 24 February 2012; 2. "Young Love" Released: 15 June 2012; 3. "Luminous" Released: 12 October 2012

Young Love is the third studio album by Irish pop duo Jedward. The album was released on 22 June 2012. In January 2012, Jedward began recording material for their third studio album, including their 2012 Eurovision Song Contest entry "Waterline". This recording was done at Wendy House Productions, in West London. The rest of the album was recorded in March at a studio in Sweden. Young Love is a concept album recounting the story of a relationship, from its beginning to end. In 2012 the album was given Gold certification in Ireland.

== Singles ==
- "Waterline" was released as the album's lead single on 24 February 2012. It also served as the duo's entry for Ireland in the 2012 Eurovision Song Contest. The song premiered on 9 February 2012 to positive reception. "Waterline" was not formally named as a track of Young Love until May. The single has two music videos - one produced by RTÉ, using footage of Jedward's Eurosong experience, and a second, filmed by John and Edward themselves, whilst on holiday in Tokyo, which serves as the official video.
- "Young Love" was released as the album's second single on 15 June 2012. A music video for the track premiered on 13 June, having been filmed in the Olympia theatre in Dublin, Ireland. The single received a digital release only.
- "Luminous" was released as the album's third single on 12 October 2012, having been announced for released as a single on 27 June. The music video was funded and filmed by the duo's record label, Universal Music Ireland, and was directed by Alex Grazioli, with a science-fiction and fantasy theme. The single was released worldwide across the week beginning on October 15, 2012.

=== Music videos ===
As well as videos for the album's three singles, John and Edward have also released music videos for other tracks from the album.

- In April 2012, the duo uploaded home made video previews of several album tracks to their YouTube account. These included the title track "Young Love", "What's Your Number", "Happens In the Dark", "POV", "Can't Forget You" and "Luminous".
- "A Girl Like You" was accompanied by a music video in June 2012, which the twins filmed themselves while working in Orlando, Florida. The video features the duo skateboarding and buying snacks and drinks from local convenience shops.
- "How Did You Know" was accompanied by a music video in October 2012, which the twins filmed themselves in St-Tropez, France. The video was filmed over the course of three days, and makes use of a multi-camera lens operation.
- The "Happens in the Dark" video premiered in March 2013, having been filmed by the duo themselves. The video was filmed in January 2013 in Toronto, Canada. The twins then previewed a clip from the video on MuchMusic. The video features the duo arriving and performing at a local house party.
- The "What's Your Number" video premiered in April 2013 on Channel V Australia. It was filmed earlier in the month in New York City and features the twins walking around Brooklyn, Coney Island and travelling in a subway car.
- A video for "P.O.V" was released online in May 2013. Filmed in Madame Tussaud's in Sydney in April, the video has the twins dancing and singing along with their song.
- The "Can't Forget You" video was released in November 2013. It was filmed in California and features locations in and around El Mirage Lake, previously used in for the Backstreet Boys' "Incomplete" and Demi Lovato's "Skyscraper" music videos.

== Track listing ==
No.	Title	Writer(s)	Producer(s)	Length
1.	"Waterline"	Nick Jarl, Sharon Vaughn	Dan Priddy	3:04
2.	"Young Love"	Lars Halvor Jensen, Tim McEwan, Jess Cates	Deekay	3:11
3.	"What's Your Number?"	Karen Poole, Paddy Dalton, Mark Blackwell	Duck & Paddy	2:57
4.	"A Girl Like You"	Claudia Mills, Paddy Dalton, Mark Blackwell	Duck & Paddy	3:20
5.	"Luminous"	Sebastian Lundberg, Fredrik Häggstam, Johan Gustafson, Marlene Strand	Trinity Music	3:26
6.	"Give It Up"	Patric Sarin, Sharon Vaughn, Veikka Erkola	Duck & Paddy	3:34
7.	"Happens In The Dark"	Jörgen Elofsson, Marcus Liden, Christian Holmstrom	Trinity Music	3:00
8.	"All I Want Is You"	Paddy Dalton, Mark Blackwell, Adam Argyle	Duck and Paddy	2:57
9.	"What It Feels Like"	Lars Halvor Jensen, Martin Michael Larsson, Jess Cates	Deekay	3:51
10.	"How Did You Know?"	Mike Shimshack, Steven Lee Olsen, Hillary Lindsey	Trinity Music	3:13
11.	"Can't Forget You"	Iain James, Johnny Dunne, Joe Hirst, Daniel Baker	DBH	3:15
12.	"P.O.V."	Sebastian Lundberg, Fredrik Häggstam, Johan Gustafson, Andreas Carlsson	Trinity Music	2:43

Deluxe Edition Bonus Tracks
No.	Title	Writer(s)	Producer(s)	Length
13.	"Never Better"	Iain James, Matt Marston, Rob Wells	Matt Marston, Rob Wells	3:32
14.	"Cool Heroes"	Yasmin Green, Will Simms	Will Simms	3:18
15.	"School's Out"	Martin Wiik, Loi Albringer	Reflection Music	3:12

== Chart performance ==
The album debuted at number one on the Irish Albums Chart, thus becoming the twins' third consecutive album to debut at the top spot of their home country's album chart. Despite minimal promotion outside Ireland, the album debuted at number 63 on the United Kingdom Albums Chart, with sales of 2,241 copies in the country during its first week of release. The album also charted at number eight on the Estonian album charts.

== Charts ==
Chart (2012)	Peak position
Austrian Albums (Ö3 Austria)	45
Finnish Albums (Suomen virallinen lista)	22
German Albums (Offizielle Top 100)	50
Irish Albums (IRMA)	1
South Korean Albums (Circle)	18
Scottish Albums (Official Charts)	78
Swedish Albums (Sverigetopplistan)	11
UK Albums (Official Charts)	63
