= Behind the Sun =

Behind the Sun may refer to:

- Behind the Sun (film), a 2001 film directed by Walter Salles
- Behind the Sun (Chicane album), 2000
- Behind the Sun (Eric Clapton album), and the title song, 1985
- Behind the Sun (Dive album), and the title song, 2004
- Behind the Sun (Motorpsycho album), 2014
- "Behind the Sun" (Red Hot Chili Peppers song), 1987
- "Behind the Sun" (Alexander Klaws song), 2004
- "Behind the Sun", a song by The Good, the Bad & the Queen from the 2007 album The Good, the Bad & the Queen
- "Behind the Sun", a song by Living Colour from the 2009 album The Chair in the Doorway
- "Behind the Sun", a song by Meshuggah from the 2012 album Koloss
- "Behind the Sun", a song by Sylosis from the 2012 album Monolith

== See also ==
- Sun (disambiguation)
- Men Behind the Sun, a 1987 Chinese film
- Things Behind the Sun, a 2001 film directed by Allison Anders
- "Things Behind the Sun", a song by Nick Drake from the 1972 album Pink Moon
