= Not Like You =

Single by Alexander Klaws

from the album Attention!
- Released: 24 February 2006
- Recorded: 2006
- Genre: Pop; pop rock
- Length: 3:43
- Label: Hansa; Sony BMG
- Songwriters: Nick Jarl; Alexander Kronlund; Kurt49
- Producer: Nick Jarl

Alexander Klaws singles chronology
"All (I Ever Want)" (2005)	"Not Like You" (2006)	"Welt" (2008)

"Not Like You" is a song by German recording artist Alexander Klaws. It was written by Nick Jarl, Alexander Kronlund, Kurt49 and produced by the former for Klaws's third studio album Attention! (2006).

== Formats and track listings ==
CD Single
No.	Title	Length
1.	"Not Like You" (Radio Version)	3:25
2.	"Not Like You" (Original Version)	3:51

== Charts ==
Chart (2006)	Peak position
Austria (Ö3 Austria Top 40)	55
Germany (GfK)	16
Switzerland (Schweizer Hitparade)	81
