= Sunshine After the Rain (Alexander Klaws song) =

Single by Alexander Klaws

from the album Here I Am
- Released: 7 June 2004
- Genre: Pop; pop rock
- Length: 3:11
- Label: Hansa; Sony BMG
- Songwriters: Svein Finneide; Aslak Johnsen; Ken Ingwersen; Jon Rydningen
- Producers: Ingwersen; Rydningen

Alexander Klaws singles chronology
"Behind the Sun" (2004)	"Sunshine After the Rain" (2004)	"Here I Am" (2004)

"Sunshine After the Rain" is a song by German recording artist Alexander Klaws. The song was written by Svein Finneide, Aslak Johnsen, Ken Ingwersen, and Jon Rydningen, with production helmed by the latter, and recorded for Klaws's second album Here I Am (2004). Released as the album's third single, it reached the top five of the German Singles Chart and entered the top twenty in Austria.

== Formats and track listings ==
CD single
No.	Title	Length
1.	"Sunshine After the Rain" (radio edit)	3:12
2.	"Sunshine After the Rain" (alternative pop version)	3:00
3.	"Sunshine After the Rain" (summer dream version)	4:22
4.	"Sunshine After the Rain" (acoustic version)	2:57
5.	"Sunshine After the Rain" (instrumental version)	3:10

== Charts ==
=== Weekly charts ===
Chart (2004)	Peak position
Austria (Ö3 Austria Top 40)	19
Germany (GfK)	5
Switzerland (Schweizer Hitparade)	36
