= All (I Ever Want) =

Single by Alexander Klaws featuring Sabrina Weckerlin

from the album Attention!
- Released: 7 March 2005
- Genre: Pop
- Length: 3:17
- Label: Sony BMG
- Songwriter: Rob Bolland
- Producer: Thorsten Brötzmann

Alexander Klaws singles chronology
"Here I Am" (2004)	"All (I Ever Want)" (2005)	"Not Like You" (2006)

"All (I Ever Want)" is a song by German recording artist Alexander Klaws. Written by Rob Bolland and produced by Thorsten Brötzmann, it features vocals from singer Sabrina Weckerlin. A German version of the duet, "Alles", was released to promote the RTL television film Hero of the Gladiators (2003). The English version of the song was later included on his third album, Attention! (2006).

== Formats and track listings ==
Enhanced CD Single
No.	Title	Length
1.	"All (I Ever Want)"	3:16
2.	"Alles"	3:16
3.	"All (I Ever Want)" (Alternative Version)	3:16
4.	"All (I Ever Want)" (Instrumental)	3:31
5.	"All (I Ever Want)" (Music video)	3:31

Maxi CD Single
No.	Title	Length
1.	"All (I Ever Want)"	3:16
2.	"Alles"	3:16

== Charts ==
Chart (2005)	Peak position
Austria (Ö3 Austria Top 40)	43
Germany (GfK)	12
Switzerland (Schweizer Hitparade)	44
