= Here I Am (Alexander Klaws song) =

Single by Alexander Klaws

from the album Here I Am
- Released: 18 October 2004
- Genre: Pop
- Length: 4:02
- Label: Hansa; Sony BMG
- Songwriters: John Reid; Yak Bondy
- Producers: Reid; Bondy

Alexander Klaws singles chronology
"Sunshine After the Rain" (2004)	"Here I Am" (2004)	"All (I Ever Want)" (2005)

"Here I Am" is a song by German recording artist Alexander Klaws. The song was written and produced by John Reid and Yak Bondy for Klaws's second album Here I Am (2004). Released as the album's fourth and final single, it became a moderate success, reached number 19 on the German Singles Chart.

== Formats and track listings ==
CD single
No.	Title	Length
1.	"Here I Am" (radio version)	3:12
2.	"Here I Am" (unplugged version)	3:00
3.	"Inspiration"	4:22
4.	"Here I Am" (album instrumental)	2:57
5.	"Here I Am" (music video)	3:10

== Charts ==
Chart (2004)	Peak position
Austria (Ö3 Austria Top 40)	45
Germany (GfK)	19
Switzerland (Schweizer Hitparade)	98
