= Auf die Bühne, fertig, los! =

Studio album by Alexander Klaws
- Released: 2015
- Recorded: 16 October 2015
- Genre: Pop
- Length: 60:59
- Label: DEAG Music

Alexander Klaws chronology
Für alle Zeiten (2011)	Auf die Bühne, fertig, los! (2015)

Auf die Bühne, fertig, los! (English: Ready, stage, go!) is the sixth studio album by German recording artist Alexander Klaws. It was released by DEAG Music on 16 October 2015 in German-speaking Europe.

== Track listing ==
Standard edition
No.	Title	Length
1.	"Wilde Welt"	3:45
2.	"Dieser Sommer"	3:36
3.	"Adrenalin"	3:50
4.	"Scheißgroße Liebe"	4:02
5.	"Jeder braucht jemanden"	3:53
6.	"Family & Friends"	4:25
7.	"Magnet"	3:19
8.	"Nur Liebe"	3:28
9.	"Lampenfieberzeit"	4:16
10.	"Liebesmillionäre"	3:59
11.	"Wenn ich verlier"	3:57
12.	"Sonne, Wind und Regen"	4:01
13.	"Take Me Tonight" (Big Band Version)	6:06
14.	"Himmel und Hölle" (Big Band Version)	4:40
15.	"Nur Liebe" (Akustik Version)	3:38

== Charts ==
Chart (2015)	Peak position
German Albums (Offizielle Top 100)	32
