= Attention! =

Studio album by Alexander Klaws
- Released: 10 March 2006
- Length: 45:00
- Label: Hansa; Sony BMG
- Producer: Terri Bjerre; Thorsten Brötzmann; Nick Jarl; Christoph Leis-Bendorff; Ivo Moring; Mirko von Schlieffen; David Stenmarck; Sandi Strmljan

Alexander Klaws chronology
Here I Am (2004)	Attention! (2006)	Was willst du noch?! (2008)

Singles from Attention!
- 1. "All (I Ever Want)" Released: 7 March 2005; 2. "Not Like You" Released: 24 February 2006

Attention! is the third studio album by German singer Alexander Klaws. It was released by Sony BMG on Hansa Records on 10 March 2006 in German-speaking Europe. Recorded after a short-living hiatus, it marked a departure from Klaws' previous work with Deutschland sucht den Superstar judge and musical mentor Dieter Bohlen, who gained no credit on the record. Instead, the album features a wider range of producers, including Terri Bjerre, David Stenmarck, Sandi Strmljan, Thorsten Brötzmann, Ivo Moring, and Mirko von Schlieffen.

The album reached the top twenty of the album charts in Austria and Germany, becoming the singer's lowest–charting album then following the number-one success of his previous albums Take Your Chance (2003) and Here I Am (2004). Attention! spawned two singles, "All (I Ever Want)", the theme song to the musical The Three Musketeers, featuring vocals by German singer Sabrina Weckerlin and leading single "Not like You".

== Track listing ==
Attention! track listing
No.	Title	Writer(s)	Producer(s)	Length
1.	"Beautiful Show"	Alexander Geringas; Sandi Strmljan	Strmljan	3:13
2.	"Stay"	Mats Tärnfors; Fredrik Willstrand; Paul Rein	Christoph Leis-Bendorff	3:53
3.	"Celebrity Queen"	Michelle Leonard	Thorsten Brötzmann	3:45
4.	"This Is What It Feels like"	Nicky Chinn; Jörgen Elofsson	Brötzmann	4:22
5.	"Not Like You" (long radio version)	Nick Jarl; Alexander Kronlund; Kurt49	Jarl	3:43
6.	"Love at First Sight"	Ivo Moring; Mirko von Schlieffen; Daniel Hall	Moring; Schlieffen; Terri Bjerre	4:07
7.	"Missing You"	Schlieffen; Moring; Bjerre	Schlieffen; Moring; Bjerre	3:35
8.	"All (I Ever Want)" (featuring Sabrina Weckerlin)	Rob Bolland	Brötzmann	3:16
9.	"My Heart Is on the Run"	David Stenmarck; Nick Jarl; Sharon Vaughn	Stenmarck	4:14
10.	"Love Is the One"	Niklas Bergwall; Niklas Kings	Brötzmann	4:00
11.	"If I'm Not the One"	Graham Kearns; Howard New; Peter Gordeno	Brötzmann	4:06
12.	"Not Enough"	Tina Harris; Moritz Bernhard; C. Gardner	Brötzmann	2:46
Total length:				45:00

Special edition bonus tracks
No.	Title	Writer(s)	Producer(s)	Length
13.	"Alextasy"	Alexander Klaws; Sandi Strmljan; Geringas	Strmljan; Geringas	3:59
14.	"Not like You" (original version)	Jarl; Kronlund; Kurt49	Jarl	3:53
15.	"Not like You" (video)

== Charts ==
Weekly chart performance for Attention!
Chart (2006)	Peak position
Austrian Albums (Ö3 Austria)	19
German Albums (Offizielle Top 100)	12
Swiss Albums (Schweizer Hitparade)	48
