= Waterline (song) =

2012 single by Jedward

Single by Jedward

from the album Young Love
- Released: 24 February 2012
- Recorded: 2011
- Genre: Electropop, teen pop
- Length: 3:01
- Label: Universal Music Ireland
- Songwriters: Nick Jarl, Sharon Vaughn
- Producer: Nick Jarl

Jedward singles chronology
"Wow Oh Wow" (2011)	"Waterline" (2012)	"Put the Green Cape On" (2012)

Music video
- "Waterline" on YouTube

Eurovision Song Contest 2012 entry
- Country: Ireland
- Artist: Jedward
- Language: English
- Composers: Nick Jarl, Sharon Vaughn
- Lyricists: Nick Jarl, Sharon Vaughn

Finals performance
- Semi-final result: 6th
- Semi-final points: 92
- Final result: 19th
- Final points: 46

Entry chronology
- ◄ "Lipstick" (2011)
- "Only Love Survives" (2013) ►

"Waterline" is a song by Irish pop duo Jedward. It was written by Swedish songwriter Nick Jarl and Swedish-based American songwriter Sharon Vaughn. It is best known as Ireland's entry at the Eurovision Song Contest 2012 held in Baku, Azerbaijan.

== Background ==
In early 2012, "Waterline" was chosen as the song for Jedward in their bid to represent Ireland at Eurovision 2012. The song was first broadcast on Mooney on 9 February 2012 alongside the other four songs against which it was to compete in the national final. It was then performed on the Irish national final on 24 February 2012. Performed fifth out of five songs, it was announced as the winner at the end of the show. The song qualified for the Eurovision final from the first semi-final, coming in 6th place of the 10 qualifiers. The song eventually finished in 19th place with 46 points. In June 2012, "Waterline" was listed as the opening track of Jedward's Young Love album.

"Waterline" was included in music blog Popjustice's Top 45 Singles of 2012 list.

== Music videos ==
Two music videos were made for "Waterline". The first was the official Eurovision version, required as part of the competition entry. It consisted of footage of Jedward performing the song at the Late Late Show, including backstage footage. The second video was made by John and Edward themselves in Tokyo. It shows the twins in various Tokyo locations, including the Sensō-ji temple and the Shibuya district.

== Track listing ==
- Digital download / CD single
1. "Waterline" - 3:01
2. "Waterline" (Instrumental) - 3:01

== Chart performance ==
Chart (2012)	Peak position
Austria (Ö3 Austria Top 40)	50
Belgium (Ultratip Bubbling Under Flanders)	27
Germany (GfK)	62
Ireland (IRMA)	5
Sweden (Sverigetopplistan)	32
UK (Official Charts Company)	122
