= Metronom Theater =

Theatre in Oberhausen, Germany

Coordinates: 51°29′28″N 6°53′08″E

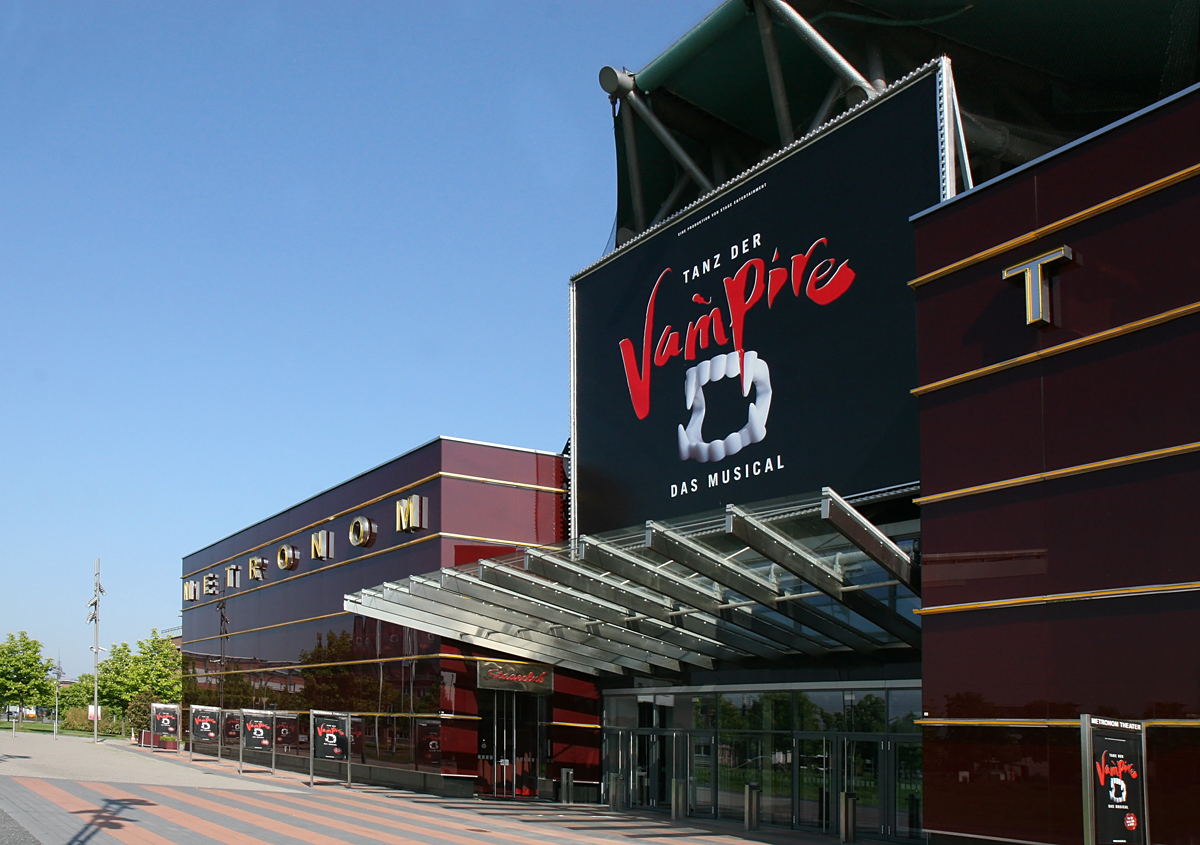
Metronom Theater in 2009.

The Metronom Theater (formerly Stage Metronom Theater and TheatrO CentrO) at the Westfield CentrO shopping centre is a venue for musicals at the Neue Mitte Oberhausen in Oberhausen, North Rhine-Westphalia, Germany. From 2005-2024, the theatre was owned and operated by Stage Entertainment Germany. Since March 2024, the theatre has been owned by Semmel Concerts, which eventually renovated it and has been running it with changing productions since November 2024. The programme includes musicals, shows and concerts.

== History ==
=== 1998 to 2005: The beginnings of the theatre ===
The musical theatre was built between November 1998 and September 1999 costing 30 million euros in the form of an arena and was equipped with 1,807 seats.

The eye-catching roof is modelled on a dragon's head. The venue was designed for the musical Tabaluga & Lilli by Peter Maffay, which was to be performed on a long-term basis. The premiere was on 24 September 1999 and despite a revision at the beginning of 2001, the production closed on 30 June 2001.

The world premiere of the musical Vom Geist der Weihnacht took place on 23 November 2001. The music was written by German composer Dirk Michael Steffan; the story is based on Charles Dickens' tale A Christmas Carol. The play was performed until 30 December 2001.

From 4 April to 30 June 2002 and 16 September to 31 December 2002, the musical FMA Falco meets Amadeus was performed, but, like the first production, Tabaluga, was only moderately well received.

=== 2005 to 2020: Run by Stage Entertainment ===
On 1 August 2005, the theatre was taken over by Stage Entertainment Germany and extensively renovated within 14 weeks for around 20 million euros, which included a redesign of the foyer, the auditorium - new and additional seats were installed, increasing the number of seats to 1830 - the backstage area and the installation of a Stage Club and a redesigned box office. After a public search for a new name for the former TheatrO, it became the Stage Metronom Theater. The theatre at CentrO.

With Disney's Beauty and the Beast, the en-suite theatre operation (meaning: 1 production plays 8 times a week for usually 1 year) began in 2005 for the Stage Metronom Theater under Stage Entertainment Germany.

With the tenth anniversary of Stage Entertainment Germany at the Oberhausen location, extensive renovation work on the roof construction began in June 2015 after a two-year planning phase. The old green roof membrane was replaced by a silver membrane for the purpose of a sophisticated lighting design.

On 29 October 2019, it was announced that no further productions would be staged at the Stage Metronom Theater after the end of the Tanz der Vampire season in March 2020. The reason given by the then owner, Stage Entertainment Germany, was that only the musicals Disney's Tarzan (2016-2018) and Tanz der Vampire (2008-2010, 2019-2020) had generated profits, that the theatre was competing with one of the densest theatre cultures in NRW and that the company now wanted to concentrate on the "strong core markets" (Hamburg, Berlin, and Stuttgart) in Germany. All other productions staged at the theatre had generated less than the production costs.

As soon as the closure was announced, theatre employees organised protests to draw the attention of audiences and the press to the situation and to persuade Stage Entertainment Germany to stay in Oberhausen and later to offer fair compensation. The announcement of the closure of the Stage Metronom Theatre triggered a wave of uproar in the musical and theatre scene. Musical star and DSDS winner Alexander Klaws, among others, reacted with incomprehension. Musical bloggers such as the Instagram page musical.werkstatt also showed virtual solidarity with the Metronom Theater and Oberhausen as a musical venue. Mehr-BB Entertainment (now ATG Entertainment) made an offer to buy the theatre in 2020, but this did not meet with any interest.

As a result of the coronavirus pandemic, the last performances of Tanz der Vampire could no longer be staged and the theatre was closed early.

=== 2020 to 2024: Theatre closed for 4 1/2 years ===
After the performance on 12 March 2020, the Stage Metronom Theater was closed early due to local measures as a result of the coronavirus pandemic; all other events were cancelled without replacement.

The future of the theatre was then uncertain for a long time, as a conflict of interest arose between the city and the owner over the continued use of the venue. There was already talk of the theatre as a lost place. The theatre's owner at the time, Stage Entertainment Germany, had wanted to prohibit a potential buyer from using the theatre for live entertainment, while the city of Oberhausen continued to see it as a lucrative venue for live entertainment. In the meantime, the company had also considered demolishing the theatre so that it could then sell the empty property; however, the city rejected this. In August 2022, a poster for a possible sale was finally put up at the theatre.

In November 2022, it was announced that the city of Oberhausen wanted to use a legal trick to ensure that the property of the Stage Metronom Theatre could only be used for live entertainment. The reason for this was that the site was originally intended for this purpose and they wanted to prevent a new buyer from demolishing the theatre and erecting company buildings there.

=== From 2024: A new start with Semmel Concerts / Limelight Live Entertainment ===
In March 2024, it was announced that Semmel Concerts had taken over the Stage Metronom Theater from Stage Entertainment Germany. The city of Oberhausen had made a significant contribution to this successful sale as an intermediary to Stage Entertainment Germany. The official handover of the keys from Stage Entertainment Germany to Semmel Concerts took place on 27 March 2024.

The Metronom Theatre and its technology were subsequently extensively rebuilt and renovated. Stage Entertainment Germany had contractually prohibited the new owner, Semmel Concerts, from allowing productions to play in the theatre for longer than 8 weeks, meaning that the Metronom Theater under the new management of Semmel Concerts would not be able to host en-suite performances for the time being. Semmel Concerts therefore opted for a changing programme at the new Metronom Theater Oberhausen.

== Productions ==
- 1999 – Juni 2001: Tabaluga & Lilli
- November 2001 – December 2001: Vom Geist der Weihnacht
- April 2002 – June 2002, September 2002 – December 2002: Falco meets Amadeus
- November 2003 – December 2003: Vom Geist der Weihnacht
- September 2004 – February 2005: Blue Balance

Stage Entertainment:

- December 2005 – January 2007: Beauty and the Beast
- March 2007 – October 2008: Blue Man Group
- November 2008 – January 2010: Tanz der Vampire
- March 2010 – September 2011: Wicked
- October 2011 – October 2012: Dirty Dancing
- December 2012 – October 2013: Ich war noch niemals in New York
- December 2013 – February 2015: Sister Act
- March 2015 – October 2015: Mamma Mia!
- November 2015 – September 2016: Das Phantom der Oper
- November 2016 – September 2018: Tarzan
- November 2018 – September 2019: Bat Out of Hell
- November 2019 – 12 March 2020: Tanz der Vampire

Semmel Concerts:

- November – December 2024: Der Geist der Weihnacht
- January 2025: Die Zauberflöte - Das Musical
- January – February 2025: The World of Hans Zimmer - An Immersive Symphony
- February – March 2025: Elisabeth
- March 2025: Stomp
- March – April 2025: Grease
- April – May 2025: Elisabeth
