= Take Your Chance (album) =

Studio album by Alexander Klaws
- Released: 28 April 2003
- Recorded: 2003
- Length: 56:35
- Label: Hansa; Sony BMG
- Producer: Dieter Bohlen

Alexander Klaws chronology
Take Your Chance (2003)	Here I Am (2004)

Singles from Attention!
- 1. "Take Me Tonight" Released: 17 March 2003; 2. "Stay with Me" Released: 10 June 2003

Take Your Chance is the debut studio album by German recording artist Alexander Klaws. It was released by Sony BMG on Hansa Records on 8 April 2003 in German-speaking Europe, following Klaws's victory on the debut season of Deutschland sucht den Superstar, the German spin-off from the British show Pop Idol, in 2003. Composition and production were largely overseen by musiican Dieter Bohlen, a judge on the show. In addition to Bohlen's original material, the album includes a cover of American singer Michael Sembello's "Maniac" (1983), which Klaws had performed on DSDS.

Critical reception to Take Your Chance was largely negative, with reviewers describing it as formulaic, unoriginal, and heavily dominated by Bohlen. Despite this, the album was commercially successful, debuting at number one in Germany, reaching the top five in Austria and the top 20 in Switzerland, and earning Gold certifications in both Germany and Switzerland. It produced two singles: "Take Me Tonight" topped the charts in Germany and Switzerland, became the second best-selling single of 2003 in Germany, and received multiple certifications, while "Stay with Me" reached the top ten in Germany.

== Promotion ==
Take Your Chance spawned two singles. The lead single, "Take Me Tonight," Klaws's coronation song from Deutschland sucht den Superstar, became a number-one hit in both Germany and Switzerland, and reached number two on the Austrian Singles Chart. It was the second best-selling single of 2003 in Germany, surpassed only by "We Have a Dream" by the first season’s finalists. The song achieved five-times Gold certification in Germany for shipments exceeding 750,000 copies, and was further certified Platinum in Austria and Gold in Switzerland. Second and final single "Stay with Me," became a top ten hit in Germany and reached number 14 in Austria and number 28 in Switzerland.

== Critical reception ==
Professional ratings
Review scores
Source	Rating
laut.de	1/5 stars

Bianca Oehl from laut.de found that Take Your Chance was a "formulaic and uninspired project" dominated by Dieter Bohlen, where the artist "lacks originality" and comes across as a clone who gets lost in Bohlen's shadow. She described the songs as "repetitive, generic, and poorly produced," with a sound resembling "low-quality boy band ballads" in which Klaws's voice "fades into a bland, uniform mix." Oehl also noted that some tracks feel "derivative or even copied," with only "Maniac" standing out positively.

== Commercial performance ==
Take Your Chance achieved strong commercial success in German-speaking countries. In Germany, the album debuted at number one on the German Albums Chart, becoming a chart-topping release. It also performed well internationally, reaching number four on the Austrian Albums Chart and peaking at number eleven on the Swiss Albums Chart. By the end of 2003, the album ranked at number 34 on the German year-end albums chart, reflecting its sustained popularity throughout the year. In terms of certifications, Take Your Chance was awarded Gold status in Germany by the Bundesverband Musikindustrie (BVMI) for shipments exceeding 100,000 units. It also received a Gold certification in Switzerland from the Swiss arm of the International Federation of the Phonographic Industry (IFPI), denoting shipments of over 20,000 units.

== Track listing ==
All tracks produced by Dieter Bohlen.

Take Your Chance track listing
No.	Title	Writer(s)	Length
1.	"Take Me Tonight"	Dieter Bohlen	4:00
2.	"I Don't Wanna Say That"	Bohlen	3:16
3.	"From the Heart of an Angel"	Bohlen	3:37
4.	"Another Day, Another Heart"	Bohlen	4:14
5.	"We Had It All"	Bohlen	3:34
6.	"Stay with Me"	Bohlen	3:54
7.	"I Need You"	Bohlen	3:42
8.	"Anything Is Possible"	Bohlen	4:04
9.	"Breakin' Up Is Hard to Do"	Bohlen	4:14
10.	"I Believe"	Bohlen	3:32
11.	"Anytime You Want Me"	Bohlen	3:30
12.	"Just Tomorrow"	Bohlen	3:40
13.	"Maniac"	Michael Sembello; Dennis Matkosky	3:53
14.	"Even When Your Love Is Gone"	Bohlen	3:51
15.	"If I Can't Have You Tonight"	Bohlen	3:54
Total length:			56:35

== Charts ==
=== Weekly charts ===
Weekly chart performance for Take Your Chance
Chart (2003)	Peak position
Austrian Albums (Ö3 Austria)	4
German Albums (Offizielle Top 100)	1
Swiss Albums (Schweizer Hitparade)	11

=== Year-end charts ===
Year-end chart performance for Take Your Chance
Chart (2003)	Position
German Albums (Offizielle Top 100)	34

== Certifications ==
Certifications for Take Your Chance
Region	Certification	Certified units/sales
Germany (BVMI)	Gold	100,000^{^}
Switzerland (IFPI Switzerland)	Gold	20,000^{^}
^{^} Shipments figures based on certification alone.
