= Stay with Me (Alexander Klaws song) =

Single by Alexander Klaws

from the album Take Your Chance
- Released: 10 June 2003
- Recorded: 2003
- Genre: Pop; Dance pop
- Length: 3:54
- Label: Hansa; Sony BMG
- Songwriter: Dieter Bohlen
- Producer: Dieter Bohlen

Alexander Klaws singles chronology
"Take Me Tonight" (2003)	"Stay with Me" (2003)	"Free Like the Wind" (2003)

"Stay with Me" is a song by German recording artist Alexander Klaws. Written and produced by Dieter Bohlen, it served as the second single from his debut studio album, Take Your Chance (2003). Released in June 2003, the uptempo pop song became Klaws's second top ten hit in Germany.

== Formats and track listings ==
CD single
No.	Title	Length
1.	"Stay with Me" (Radio-Version)	3:31
2.	"Stay with Me" (Retro-Mix)	3:59
3.	"I'll Love You 'til The Day I Die"	3:32
4.	"Stay with Me" (Instrumental)	3:30

== Credits and personnel ==
Credits taken from Take Your Chance liner notes.

- Co-production, mixing – Jeo
- Artwork – Ronald Reinsberg
- Choir – Billy King, Chris Bendorff, Olaf Senkbeil
- Guitar – Jörg Sander
- Lyrics, music, production – Dieter Bohlen

== Charts ==
Chart (2003)	Peak position
Austria (Ö3 Austria Top 40)	14
Germany (GfK)	9
Switzerland (Schweizer Hitparade)	28
