= Was willst du noch?! =

Studio album by Alexander Klaws
- Released: 4 April 2008
- Length: 50:33
- Label: Cruiser; Edel

Alexander Klaws chronology
Attention! (2006)	Was willst du noch?! (2008)	Für alle Zeiten (2011)

Was willst du noch?! is the fourth studio album by German singer Alexander Klaws. It was released by Edel Music on Cruiser Entertainment on 4 April 2008 in German-speaking Europe.

== Critical reception ==
Professional ratings
Review scores
Source	Rating
laut.de	1/5 stars

Artur Schulz from laut.de wrote a sharply negative review of Was willst du noch?!, criticizing it as formulaic and shallow. He described the music as "pseudo-rock candy in a thin schlager sauce" and the vocals as "expressionless and limited." Overall, Schulz concluded the album lacked quality, implying listeners would prefer "decent music."

== Track listing ==
Was willst du noch?! track listing
No.	Title	Length
1.	"Welt"	3:49
2.	"Zu spät zu früh"	3:46
3.	"Sie liebt dich"	4:02
4.	"Du tust mir gut"	3:47
5.	"Vor dir"	3:42
6.	"Schönes Leben"	3:54
7.	"Was willst du noch?!"	3:26
8.	"Es wird immer Liebe sein"	3:46
9.	"Ich könnte, wenn ich wollte"	4:11
10.	"Ich erinner' mich"	3:23
11.	"Wenn du gehst"	3:24
12.	"Ich war immer bei dir"	5:07
Total length:		50:33

== Charts ==
Weekly chart performance for Was willst du noch?!
Chart (2008)	Peak position
German Albums (Offizielle Top 100)	28
