= Für alle Zeiten =

Studio album by Alexander Klaws
- Released: 23 September 2011
- Recorded: 2007–2008
- Genre: Pop
- Length: 47:44
- Label: Deag, Sony
- Producer: Thorsten Brötzmann, Ivo Moring

Alexander Klaws chronology
Was willst du noch?! (2008)	Für alle Zeiten (2011)	Auf die Bühne, fertig, los! (2015)

Für alle Zeiten is the fifth studio album by German recording artist Alexander Klaws. It was released by Sony Music on Deag Music on 23 September 2011 in German-speaking Europe.

== Track listing ==
No.	Title	Writer(s)	Producer(s)	Length
1.	"Zurück im Leben"	Alexander Klaws, Ivo Moring, Karsten Ruddigkeit	Thorsten Brötzmann, Ivo Moring	3:27
2.	"Ich glaube an Liebe"	Alexander Klaws, Ivo Moring, Mariana Wagner	Thorsten Brötzmann, Ivo Moring	3:30
3.	"Das ist Leben"	Alexander Klaws, Thorsten Brötzmann, Ivo Moring, Jan Löchel	Thorsten Brötzmann, Ivo Moring	3:25
4.	"Du gehst mir unter die Haut"	Thorsten Brötzmann, Ivo Moring, Mariana Wagner	Thorsten Brötzmann, Ivo Moring	3:24
5.	"Der Sonne entgegen"	Thorsten Brötzmann, Ivo Moring, Jan Löchel	Thorsten Brötzmann, Ivo Moring	3:19
6.	"Ohne dich"	Thorsten Brötzmann, Ivo Moring, Jan Löchel	Thorsten Brötzmann, Ivo Moring	3:41
7.	"In allen Zeiten"	Alexander Klaws, Ivo Moring, Karsten Ruddigkeit	Thorsten Brötzmann, Ivo Moring	3:19
8.	"Hab keine Angst"	Thorsten Brötzmann, Ivo Moring, Maria Stadnichenko	Thorsten Brötzmann, Ivo Moring	3:22
9.	"Zurück zu Dir"	Thorsten Brötzmann, Ivo Moring, Chris Buseck	Thorsten Brötzmann, Ivo Moring	3:41
10.	"Träumer"	Thorsten Brötzmann, Ivo Moring, Jan Löchel	Thorsten Brötzmann, Ivo Moring	3:29
11.	"Rette mich"	Thorsten Brötzmann, Ivo Moring, Jan Löchel	Thorsten Brötzmann, Ivo Moring	3:28
12.	"Danke"	Thorsten Brötzmann, Ivo Moring, Jan Löchel	Thorsten Brötzmann, Ivo Moring	3:19

== Charts ==
Chart (2011)	Peak position
German Albums (Offizielle Top 100)	46
