= Free Like the Wind =

Single by Alexander Klaws

from the album Here I Am
- Released: 27 October 2003
- Recorded: 2003
- Genre: Pop
- Length: 3:44
- Label: Hansa; Sony BMG
- Songwriter: Dieter Bohlen
- Producer: Dieter Bohlen

Alexander Klaws singles chronology
"Stay with Me" (2003)	"Free Like the Wind" (2003)	"Behind the Sun" (2004)

"Free Like the Wind" is a song by German recording artist Alexander Klaws. Written and produced by frequent contributor Dieter Bohlen, it was released as the lead single from Klaws's second album Here I Am (2004), while serving as the theme song for the television film Hero of the Gladiators (2003). Upon its release, the uplifting ballad debuted at number-one on the German Singles Chart, becoming his second single to do so, and reached number two in both Austria and Switzerland.

== Formats and track listings ==
CD Single
No.	Title	Length
1.	"Free Like the Wind" (Radio Version)	3:47
2.	"Free Like the Wind" (Orchestral Version)	3:46
3.	"Free Like the Wind" (Instrumental Version)	3:45
4.	"Like a Hero"	3:37

== Credits and personnel ==
Credits taken from Here I Am liner notes.

- Artwork — Ronald Reinsberg
- Lyrics, music, production — Dieter Bohlen
- Mixing — Jeo

== Charts ==
=== Weekly charts ===
Chart (2003)	Peak position
Austria (Ö3 Austria Top 40)	2
Germany (GfK)	1
Switzerland (Schweizer Hitparade)	2

=== Year-end charts ===
Chart (2003)	Position
Austria (Ö3 Austria Top 40)	34
Germany (Media Control GfK)	14
Switzerland (Schweizer Hitparade)	30

Chart (2004)	Position
Austria (Ö3 Austria Top 40)	35
Germany (Media Control GfK)	45
Switzerland (Schweizer Hitparade)	62

== Certifications ==
Region	Certification	Certified units/sales
Austria (IFPI Austria)	Gold	15,000^{*}
Germany (BVMI)	Platinum	300,000^{^}
^{*} Sales figures based on certification alone.^{^} Shipments figures based on certification alone.
