= Behind the Sun (Alexander Klaws song) =

Single by Alexander Klaws

from the album Here I Am
- Released: 23 February 2004
- Genre: Pop
- Length: 3:56
- Label: Hansa; Sony BMG
- Songwriter: Dieter Bohlen
- Producer: Dieter Bohlen

Alexander Klaws singles chronology
"Free Like the Wind" (2003)	"Behind the Sun" (2004)	"Sunshine After the Rain" (2004)

"Behind the Sun " is a song by German recording artist Alexander Klaws. Written and produced by frequent contributor Dieter Bohlen, it was released as the second single from Klaws' second album, Here I Am (2004). A commercial success, it peaked at number two on the German Singles Chart and entered the top 20 in Austria and Switzerland, respectively.

== Track listing ==
CD single
No.	Title	Length
1.	"Behind the Sun" (radio edit)	4:05
2.	"Behind the Sun" (Classic mix)	4:01
3.	"Behind the Sun" (Guitar mix)	4:00
4.	"Behind the Sun" (radio instrumental)	3:59

== Credits and personnel ==
Credits are taken from the Here I Am liner notes.

- Co-production — Jeo, Lalo Titenkov
- Artwork — Ronald Reinsberg
- Lyrics, music, production — Dieter Bohlen
- Mixing — Jeo

== Charts ==
=== Weekly charts ===
Chart (2004)	Peak position
Austria (Ö3 Austria Top 40)	15
Germany (GfK)	2
Switzerland (Schweizer Hitparade)	18

=== Year-end charts ===
Chart (2004)	Position
Germany (Media Control GfK)	85
