= Here I Am (Alexander Klaws album) =

Album by Alexander Klaws

Studio album by Alexander Klaws
- Released: 12 July 2004
- Length: 52:46
- Label: Hansa; Sony BMG
- Producer: Dieter Bohlen; Yak Bondy; Brix; Ear; Ken Ingwersen; Ingo Politz; John Reid; Jon Rydningen; Jens Thoresen; Bernd Wendlandt

Alexander Klaws chronology
Take Your Chance (2003)	Here I Am (2004)	Attention! (2006)

Here I Am is the second studio album by German singer Alexander Klaws. It was released by Sony BMG on Hansa Records on 12 July 2004 in German-speaking Europe.

== Critical reception ==
Professional ratings
Review scores
Source	Rating
laut.de	2/5 stars

Stefan Johannesberg from laut.de noted that Here I Am was a make-or-break album for Klaws, deciding whether he remains relevant or becomes a "one-hit phenomenon." He described "Sunshine After the Rain" as "almost rock-oriented" and "Behind the Sun" as leaning toward "shallow folk-pop reminiscent of Chris de Burgh," but criticizes Klaws' vocals and the songwriting, warning listeners could "drown in kindergarten English." Still, he found that the album was working as "easy listening" background music.

== Commercial performance ==
Here I Am reached number one on the German Albums Chart, matching the peak success of his debut album Take Your Chance (2003), while charting at 25 in Austria and 26 in Switzerland, indicating a less dominant performance outside Germany.

== Track listing ==
Here I Am tack listing
No.	Title	Writer(s)	Producer(s)	Length
1.	"Sunshine After the Rain"	Aslak Johnsen; Svein Finneide; Jon Rydningen; Ken Ingwersen	Rydningen; Ingwersen	3:11
2.	"Free Like the Wind"	Dieter Bohlen	Bohlen	3:44
3.	"Here I Am"	John Reid; Yak Bondy	Reid; Bondy	4:02
4.	"Maybe"	Bohlen	Bohlen	3:47
5.	"Another Heart Is Broken"	Bohlen	Bohlen	3:38
6.	"Break Free"	Lisa Greene; Andreas Carlsson	Ingo Politz; Brix	3:08
7.	"There Is No Good in Goodbye"	Tom Nichols; Peer Åström	Bernd Wendlandt; Brix	3:52
8.	"Light of Day"	Chesney Hawkes; Finneide; Jens Thoresen	Thoresen; Ear	4:11
9.	"Behind the Sun"	Bohlen	Bohlen	3:56
10.	"If I Could Live Forever"	Bohlen	Bohlen	3:25
11.	"Don't Be Cool"	Bohlen	Bohlen	4:14
12.	"You've Got That Look"	Heiko Schneider; Markus Metz	Politz; Wendlandt	3:40
13.	"Why Does It Always Rain on Me"	Bohlen	Bohlen	3:33
14.	"Sunshine After the Rain" (Summer Dream Version)	Bohlen	Bohlen	4:24
Total length:				52:46

== Charts ==
Weekly chart performance for Here I Am
Chart (2004)	Peak position
Austrian Albums (Ö3 Austria)	25
German Albums (Offizielle Top 100)	1
Swiss Albums (Schweizer Hitparade)	26
