= Nick Jarl =

Swedish songwriter, record producer and musician

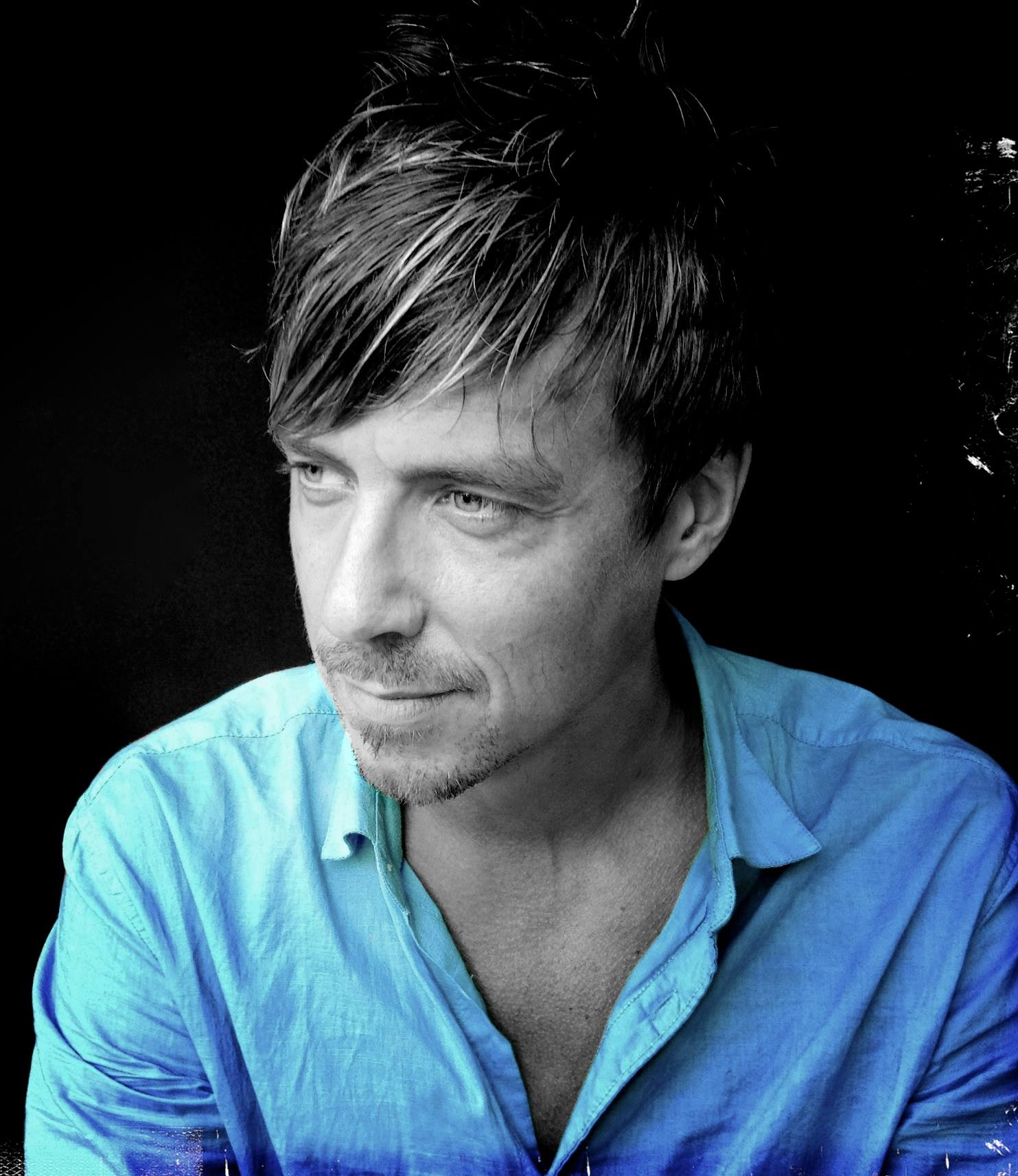

Background information
- Birth name: Niklas Jarl
- Born: 6 September 1967 (age 57)
- Origin: Stockholm, Sweden
- Genres: Pop, electropop, dance-pop, pop rock,
- Occupation(s): Songwriter, record producer, musician
- Instrument: keyboards
- Years active: 2001–present
- Website: http://www.jarl.se

Niklas Jarl (born 6 September 1967), known professionally as Nick Jarl, is a Swedish songwriter, record producer and musician. Some of his songs include "You Make Me Feel" - Westlife (co-written by Max Martin), "Heal" - Westlife (co-written by Savan Kotecha), "Written in the Stars" - Westlife (co-written by Andreas Carlsson), "I Promise You That" - Westlife, "Stay with Me" - Ironik, and "I Don't Need a Lover" - Will Young, Waterline - Jedward.

== Selected discography ==
Title	Year	Album	Songwriter	Producer
"When You Were young"	2019	Scam - Single	check	check
"Die Trying"	2019	Daniela Vecchia - Single	check	
"Ain't Nobody"	2019	Julia Lov - Single	check	check
"Sonic Boom"	2018	Taylor Carsson - Single	check	check
"Fire (Po Po Pom Pom)"	2018	Julia Lov - Single	check	check
"Not Alone"	2017	Shalisa - Single	check	check
"Skin"	2017	Mergime - Single	check	
"Broken Dreams"	2017	Connell Cruise - Barely Breathing	check	
"Magic Call"	2016	Ella Sanoo - "Single"	check	check
"Losing the love"	2016	Martina Stoessel – Tini	check	
"Se escapa tu amor"	2016	Martina Stoessel – Tini	check	
"I don't need a lover"	2015	Will Young - 85% Proof	check	
"Stir it up"	2015	Måns Zelmerlöw - Perfectly Damaged	check	
"The core of you"	2015	Måns Zelmerlöw - Perfectly Damaged	check	
"No second time around"	2015	Peter Aristone - "Single"	check	check
"Written in the stars"		Westlife – Greatest Hits	check	check
"Heal"		Westlife – Turnaround	check	check
"I promise you that"		Westlife – World of our own	check	check
"You make me feel"		Westlife – Coast to coast	check	
"Stay with me"		Ironik – Single	check	check
"Crying out your name"		Loreen – Single	check	
"Waterline"		Jedward – Single	check	
"This Party"		Molly Sanden – Unchained	check	
"1000 Miles"		H.E.A.T – Single	check	check
"Final Destination"		Michael Learns To Rock – Michael Learns To Rock	check	check
"The Final Cut"		A-Teens – Greatest Hits	check	check
"With or without you"		A-Teens – Greatest Hits	check	check
"Not like you"		Alexander Klaws – Single	check	check
"My heart is on the run"		Alexander Klaws – Attention	check	check
"2 Happy 2 Soon"		Erik Segerstedt – A different shade	check	check
"Break the silence"		Erik Segerstedt – Single	check	check
"List of lovers"		Antique – List of lovers	check	
"Is he the one"		Anders Johansson – Single	check	check
"Crash and burn"		Erik Grönwall – Single	check	
"Super girl"		Ellinor – Single	check	check
"Kokobom"		Ellinor – Single	check	check
"Remembering the summer night's"		Nikki Ponte – Single	check	
"My heart's at heavens door"		Timothy James – Make it happen	check	
"No one has to hurt"		Anders Ekborg – Painted dreams	check	
"Lovely Lily"		Richi M – Single	check	
"Lily's back"		Richi M – Face the future	check	
"All in the game"		FAME – Single	check	check
"Listen girl"		Johan Östberg – Single	check	check
"Are you ready"		Timo Langner – Single	check	check
"Casse comme du verre"		Priscilla – Single	check	
"Noll disciplin"		Idiot – Single	check	check
"Ta dom jävlarna"		Martin Stenmarck – 9 sanningar och 1 lögn	check	
"Sömnlöshet"		Maja Gullstrand – Hemligheter	check	check
"Tidsmaskin"		Mathias Holmgren – Vägen hem	check	check
"Ett ljus för dig"		Mathias Holmgren – Vägen hem	check	
"Färger"		Friends – Best of	check	check
"Till er"		Barbados – Hela himlen	check	check
"Även om"		Albin Feat Rasmus Ingdahl – Single	check	
"Jag hatar dig"		Alexander Schöld – Single	check	
"Varför börja om"		Marcus Örhn – Single	check	check
