= Yak Bondy =

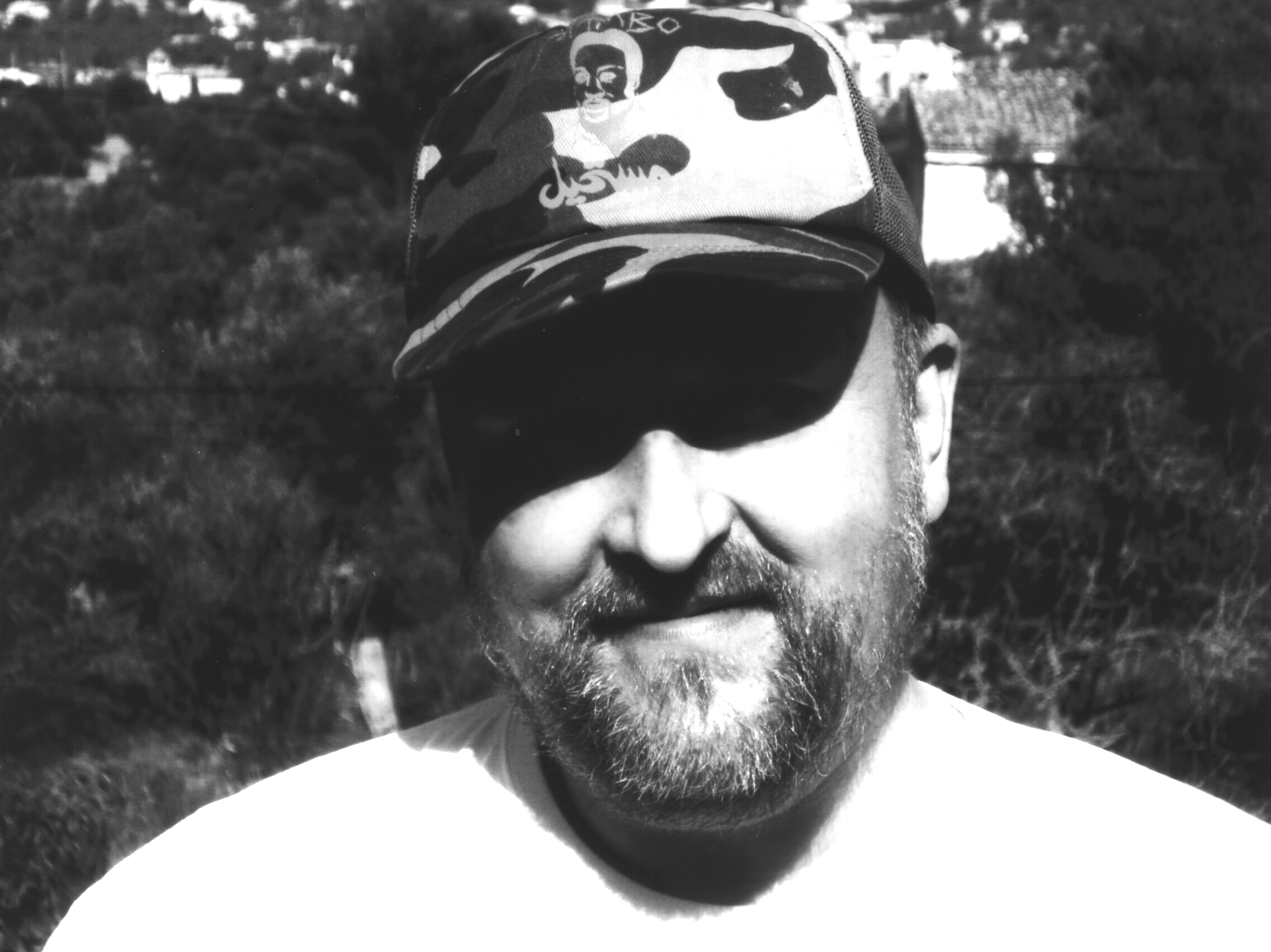

Background information
- Born: 8 July 1962 (age 63); Germany
- Occupations: Motion graphic artist, composer, music producer, songwriter, lyricist, programmer
- Instruments: Keyboards, piano, synthesiser, percussion, vocoder, vocals
- Years active: 1990–present
- Website: yakbondy.com

Yak Bondy (born 8 July 1962 as Jerk Bondy in Goslar, Germany) is a London-based music producer, composer and visual artist. Bondy has been professionally involved in the music industry since the 1980s. After moving from Hannover (Germany) to London in 1987 to compose the soundtrack for a documentary series, Bondy has worked with many international artists.

Career highlights include being musical director and keyboard player for Lisa Stansfield's world tour, remixing M People and Annie Lennox, working with Grammy-winning A.R. Rahman, producing songs by Diane Warren and Melanie C, as well as writing and producing albums for UK stars S Club 7 and former Spice Girl Emma Bunton, resulting in dozens of Gold and Platinum awards.

As a film music composer and orchestrator Bondy works with the music licensing service, Hollywood Elite Music & Media in Los Angeles.

Bondy's audiovisual art and motion graphics appear on the digital platform Blackdove in Miami.

== Musical career ==
Bondy worked as keyboard player and musical director on Lisa Stansfield's first world tour, which included appearances on The Arsenio Hall Show and Late Night with David Letterman. The tour ended with a performance at Rock in Rio 1991. Bondy worked as a music programmer with Indian musician A.R. Rahman on his 1997 studio album Vande Mataram. In 2000, Bondy was credited with keyboards and programming in Pokémon: The Movie 2000.

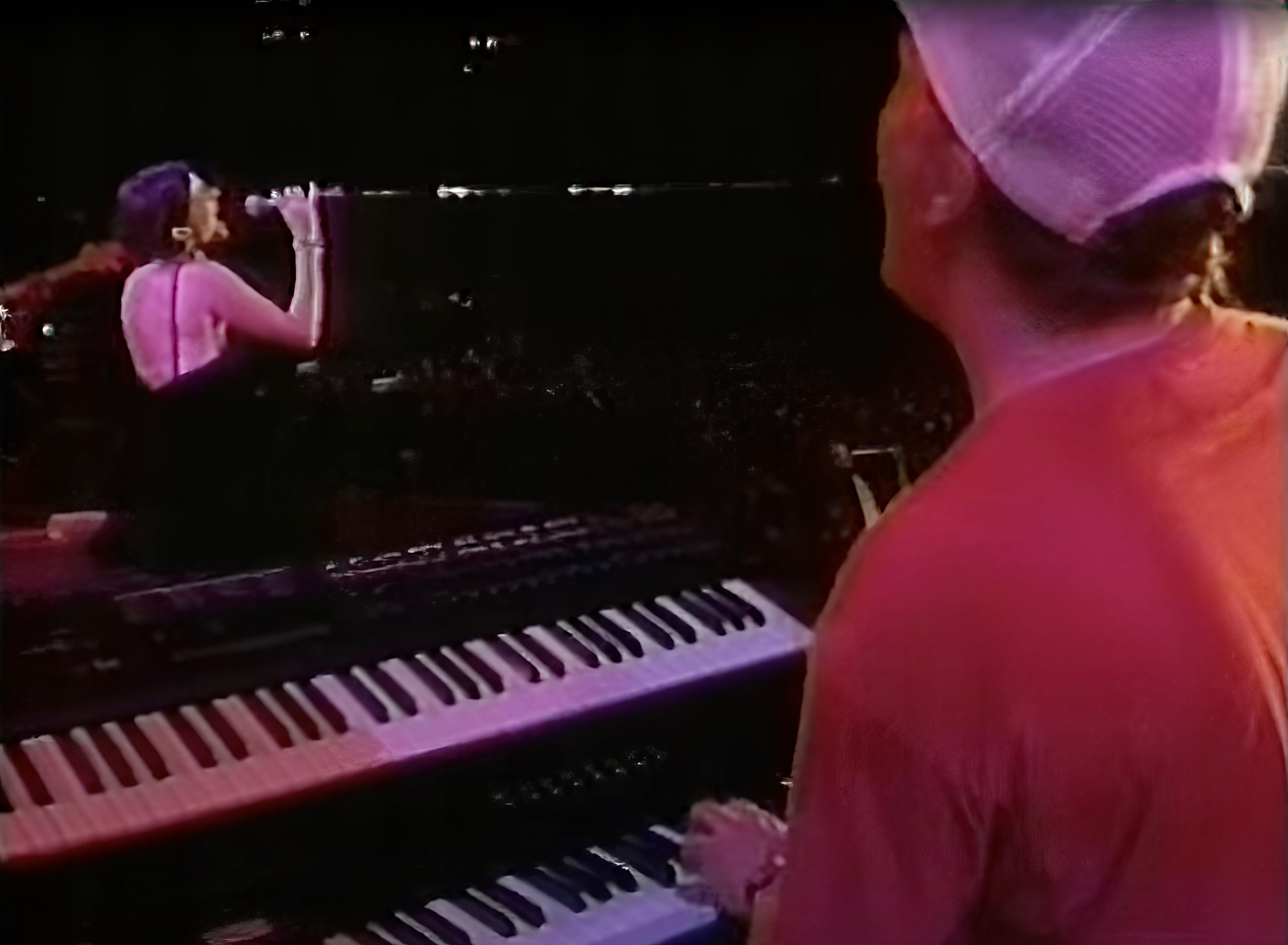
Yak Bondy as keyboard player & musical director on Lisa Stansfield's world tour 1990

In 2004, Bondy had both producer and songwriting credits on the album Free Me, from former Spice Girl, Emma Bunton. One of the songs on the album co-written by Bondy, "Maybe", debuted at number 6 on the UK Singles Chart, and later a remixed version rose to number 6 in the US on the Billboard Hot Dance Club Play. Bondy also co-wrote and produced the song, "Just a Little Girl" with Amy Studt. The song rose as high as number 14 on the UK Singles Chart.

While Bondy's most notable achievements were with Bunton and Studt, he has also worked with notable performers such as Rachel Stevens, S Club 8 and S Club 7. Bondy is also credited on the 2004 album from Alexander Klaws, Here I Am, which debuted at number 1 on the German Album Charts. Klaws was the winner of Deutschland sucht den Superstar, the German entry in the Idol franchise. Under the same franchise Bondy is credited as composer for the 2006 Singapore Idol winner's song, "You Give Me Wings" with Hady Mirza, with both single and debut album reaching number 1 chart position.

Bondy works as a senior songwriting tutor at BIMM, in London

== Artistic career ==
As a digital motion artist Bondy combines music and AI-driven visuals into moving works of art and sound.

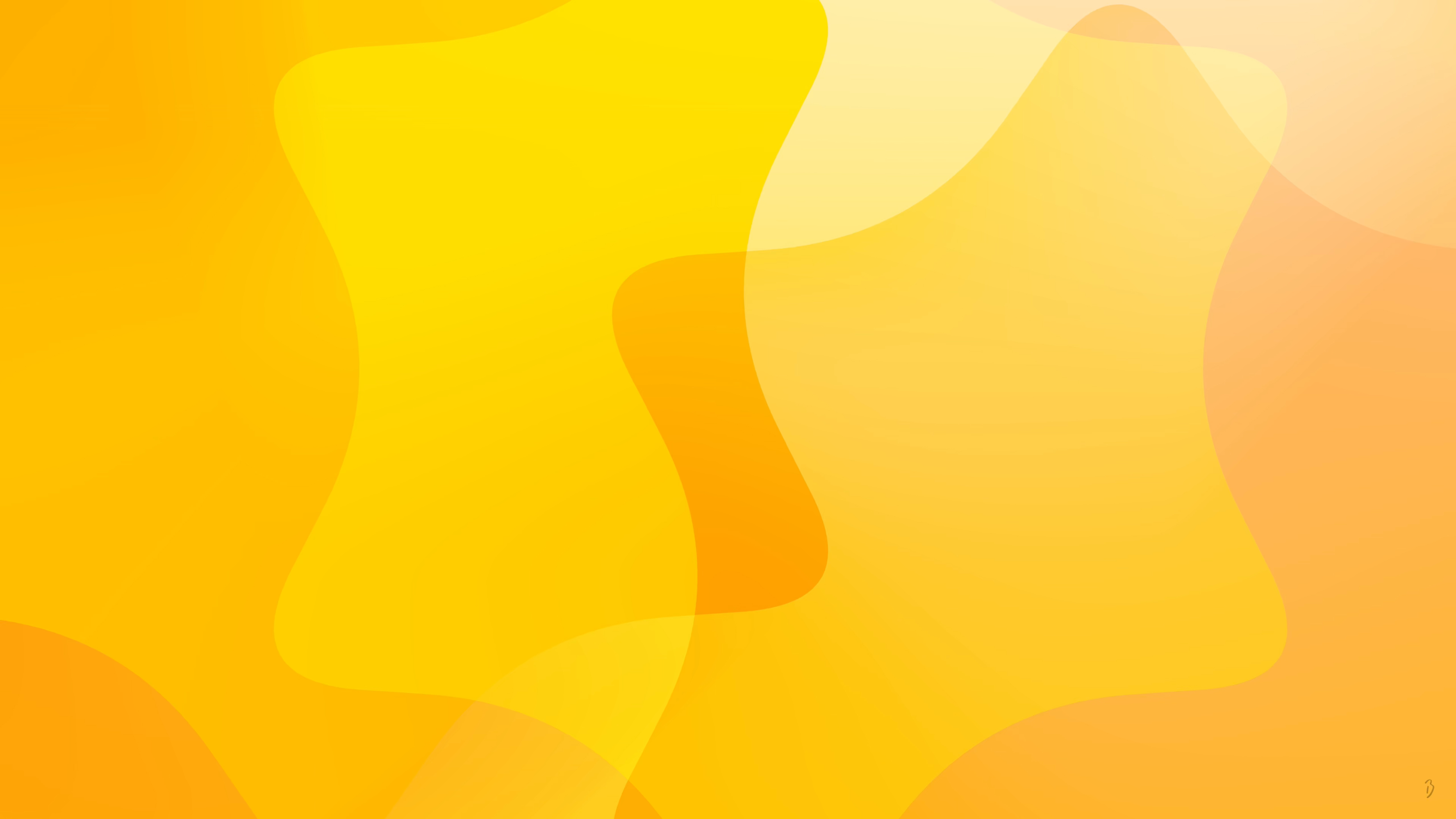
Artwork "Lava Chroma - Day" © Yak Bondy 2022

His six-image series entitled "Lava Chroma" is inspired by lava lamps of the hippie era with colorful fluid shapes, described by art platform Blackdove as "exuding warmth and joy". The audio of all images played simultaneously results in one harmonic chord stack.

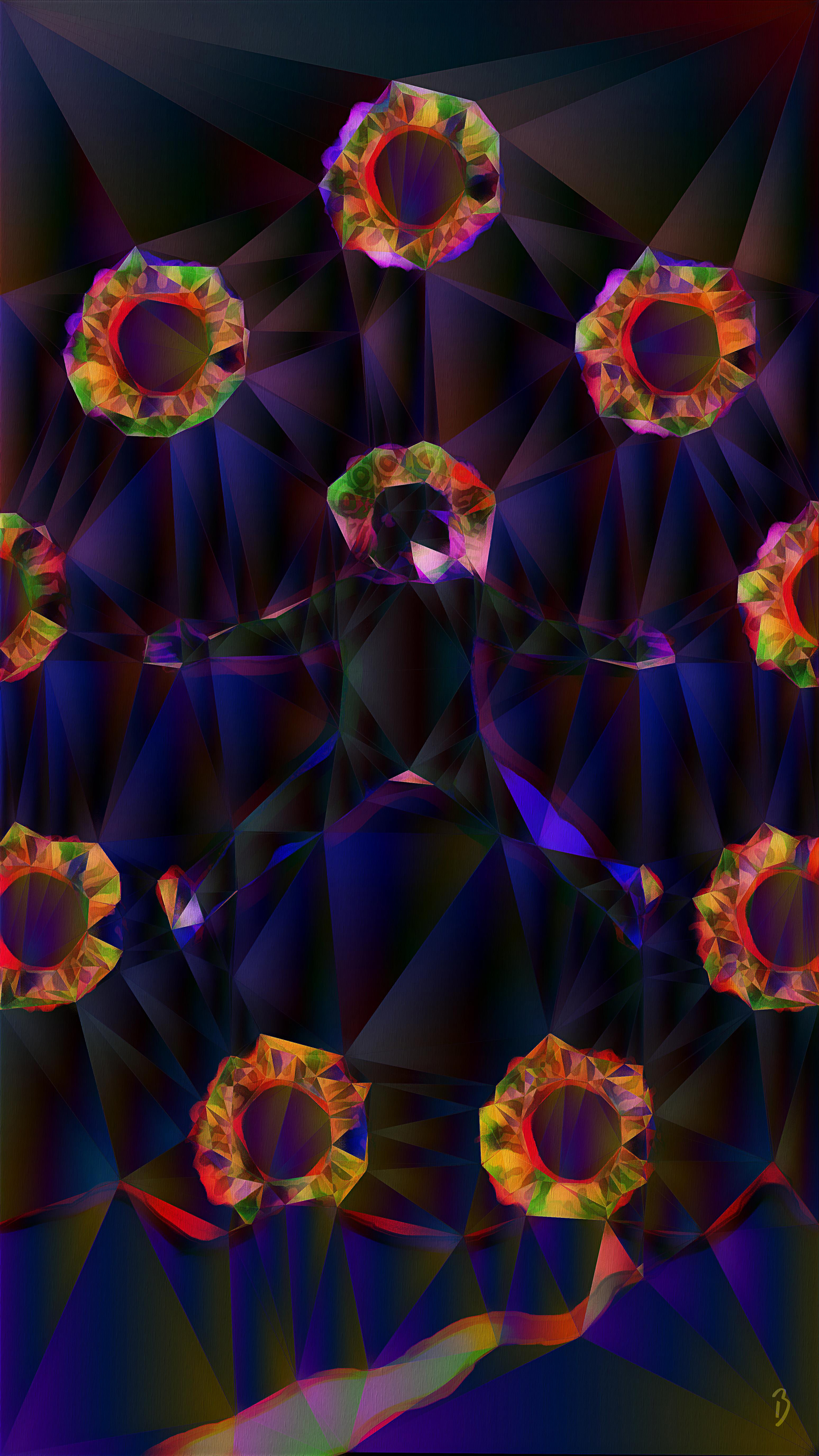
Artwork Tarot 22 "The Child" © Yak Bondy 2021

A larger series "Living Tarots" features cards of the Tarot deck in a contemporary Cubist style. The cyclical wavelike animation reveals the hidden wireframe as scratch art. Each piece is accompanied by an original composition matching the purported symbolism of each card, characterized by one curator as "With soft motion and luxurious design, these tarots are alive from within."

== Discography - Albums/EPs ==
Year	Artist	Album/EP	Label/Publisher	Credits	Charts	Awards/Info
					all citation sources: GER; UK; US	all citation sources: GER; UK; US
1986	The P.O.X.	Voodoo Power	Kix 4 U Records	Production		
1989	Latin Quarter	Swimming Against The Stream	RCA	Drums, synth, programming	GER 38, SWE 50	
1991	Lisa Stansfield	Real Love	Arista	Harmonica, keyboards, programming	UK 3, GER 9, US 43	UK 2× Platinum, GER Gold
1992	Mark Keller	Mark Keller	Metronome	Producer, written by, keyboards		
1994	Spice	Fred's Bowling Center	SPV Recordings	Composer, production, backing vocals, synthesiser		
1994	Juliet Roberts	Natural Thing	Cooltempo	Programmed by	UK 65	
1995	Maysa	Maysa	Blue Thumb Records	Composer	US R&B/Hip-Hop 64	
1996	Spice	Vario Bel Air	SPV Recordings	Arranged by, backing vocals, production		
1997	A.R. Rahman	Vande Mataram	Sony Music, Columbia	Production, programming		IND 1.5 Million sold copies
1998	Billie	Honey to the B	Innocent, Virgin	Backing vocals, keyboards, production, programming, vocoder	UK 14, US 17, NZ 3	UK Platinum, RMNZ 2× Platinum
1999	A.R. Rahman	Dil Se..	Venus	Remix programmer		
1999	Edu	Mil Y Una	EMI	Producer, composed by		
1999	Samuel Purdey	Musically Adrift	Good Sounds, RAK	Vocoder		
2000	Pokémon 2 (Pokémon 2000)	The Power of One	Atlantic	Programming, keyboard, effects	US 85	Box office $133.9 million
2000	Madison Avenue	The Polyester Embassy	Vicious Grooves	Percussion, programming	UK 74, AUS 4	ARIA Platinum
2000	Billie Piper	Walk of Life	Virgin, Innocent	Arranged by (strings), keyboards, production, recorded by	UK 14	UK Silver
2001	S Club 7	Sunshine	Polydor	Drums, keyboards, production, written by	UK 3, IRE 11, NZ 13	UK 2× Platinum, RMNZ Gold
2002	Holly Valance	Footprints	London Records	Programming	UK 9, AUS 15	UK Gold, ARIA Gold
2003	Rachel Stevens	Funky Dory	Polydor	Keyboards, production, written by	UK 9	UK Gold
2003	Amy Studt	False Smiles	19 Recordings, Polydor	Written by, production, keyboards, instruments, drums. bass	UK 18	UK Gold
2003	Tymes 4	4 Story	Avex Trax	Production, written by		
2003	S Club 8	Sundown	19 Recordings, Polydor	Production	UK 13	UK Silver
2003	Lisa Stansfield	The Complete Collection	Arista	Keyboards, programming, harmonica		
2003	Björgvin Halldórsson	Duet	Sena	Written by		
2004	Emma Bunton	Free Me	19 Recordings, Universal	Keyboards, production, written by	UK 7	UK Gold
2004	Alexander	Here I Am	BMG	Written by	GER 1, AUT 2	GER Gold
2004	Juliette Schoppmann	Unique	Modul, 19 Recordings	Written by	GER 15	
2005	Various Artists	Barbie Girls	Universal	Composer		
2005	BoA	Girls on Top	S.M. Entertainment, Avex Trax	Composer	KR 3	
2005	七朵花 (7 Flowers)	7朵花專輯 (7 Flowers)	Warner Music Taiwan	Written by		
2006	Emma Bunton	Life in Mono	19 Recordings, Universal	Written by, mixed by, production, instruments	UK 65	
2018	Psyrena	Psyrena's Christmas	Kobalt, AWAL	Written by, production		
2019	Psyrena	Fallen Angel	Kobalt, AWAL	Written by, production		
2021	Psyrena	Quarantella Rockefella	Kobalt, AWAL	Written by, production		

== Discography - Singles/Songs ==
Year	Artist	Single/Song	Label/Publisher	Credits	Charts	Awards/Info
					all citation sources: GER; UK; US	all citation sources: GER; UK; US
1991	Victoria Wood	The Smile Song (Comic Relief)	London Records	Programmed by, keyboards	UK 1	
1991	Zero G	Peter & The Wolf	Hullabaloo	Written By, Producer		
1991	Snowboy	Give Me The Sunshine	Big Life	Keyboards		
1992	Mark Keller	Wish You Were Near Me	Metronome	Written By, Producer		
1992	Mark Keller	Gone with the Wind	Metronome	Written By, Producer		
1992	Dana Lee	Never Say Forever	Hardback Records	Written By		
1993	McKoy	On The Streets	Right Track Records	Keyboards		
1993	Mark Keller	Rocket From Her Heart/Front Page	Metronome	Written By, Producer		
1993	East 17	Slow It Down	London Records	Programmed by	UK 13	
1993	East 17	Deep	London Records	Programmed by	UK 5, GER 14	
1994	Spice	Funkiest Bondy in Town	SPV Recordings	Producer, backing vocals, synthesiser		
1994	Spice	Turn It On	SPV Recordings	Producer, written by		
1994	M People	Renaissance	Deconstruction	Remix, production	UK 5, IRE 8	
1994	Ondrea Duverney	Next To You	E-Zee	Written by		
1995	Spice	Never Let You Down Again	SPV Recordings	Producer		
1995	Spice	Get High on the Music/Turn It On	SPV Recordings	Producer		
1995	Annie Lennox	Train in Vain; No More I Love Yous	RCA	Programming, remixes	UK 2, GER 27, US 23	UK Gold
1995	Lisa Snowdon	Feels So Good (Addiction)	RE.AK.TOR Records	Composer, production		
1995	Kenny Thomas	When I Think of You	Cooltempo	Backing vocals, programmed by	UK 27	
1995	General Grant	Call Me	MCA Records	Programmed by		
1995	Melody Washington	Love Gone Wild	Quark	Written, produced, all instruments		
1996	Spice	Together Again	SPV Recordings	Producer, remix		
1996	Mark Morrison	Horny	WEA	Vocoder	UK 5	UK Silver
1997	Mark Morrison	Who's The Mack	WEA	Production, remix	UK 13	
1997	Kavana	Crazy Chance/Listen to the Music	Nemesis, Virgin	Production, mixed by	UK 35	
1998	Peace By Piece	Nobody's Business	Blanco Y Negro	Remix, production		
1998	Billie	She Wants You	Innocent, Virgin	Keyboards, programmed by	UK 3, NZ 4	UK Silver
1998	Billie	Girlfriend	Innocent, Virgin	Programmed by	UK 1, NZ 2	UK Silver, RMNZ Gold
1998	Billie	Because We Want To	Innocent, Virgin	Programmed by	UK 1, NZ 9	UK Silver
1999	Diane Warren	Show Me The Way Back To Your Heart	EMI	Producer		
1999	Edu	Mil Y Una	EMI	Producer		
1999	Edu	Contigo	EMI	Producer		
1999	Edu	No Puedo Cambiar	EMI	Producer		
2000	Pokémon 2 (Pokémon 2000)	One	Atlantic	Programming, keyboard, effects		
2000	Melanie C	I Turn to You	Virgin	Production	UK 1, GER 2, US 1 Dance Club	UK Gold, AUS Platinum
2000	S Club 7	Natural	Polydor	Programming	UK 3	
2000	Billie Piper	Walk of Life	Innocent, Virgin	String arrangement, recorded/programmed by	UK 25	
2001	S Club 7	Don't Stop Movin'/Natural	Polydor	Keyboards, programmed by	UK 1, GER 9, AUS 2	UK Platinum, AUS 2× Platinum
2002	S Club 7	You/The Long & Winding Road	Polydor, 19	Producer, all instruments except guitars	UK 2	
2002	Amy Studt	Just a Little Girl	Polydor, 19	Production, keyboards, drums, bass, written by	UK 14	
2003	Amy Studt	Put Your Faith in Me	Polydor, 19	Production, written by		
2003	Amy Studt	Misfit/Queen A	Polydor, 19	Production, written by, instruments	UK 6	
2003	Tymes 4	Hooked	Edel	Written by, production		
2003	Emma Bunton	Free Me/Tomorrow	19, Universal	Written by, production, keyboards	UK 5	
2003	Emma Bunton	Maybe	19, Universal	Written by	UK 6	
2004	Emma Bunton	Maybe (Latino Version)	19, Universal	Written by, production, bass, keyboards		
2004	Emma Bunton	Crickets Sing For Anamaria/Eso Beso/So Nice	19, Universal	Production, recorded by, keyboard, bass, chromonica	UK 15	
2004	Alexander	Here I Am	BMG	Written by	GER 19	
2004	Rebecca	A 1000 And One Nights	Smash Music	Written by		
2005	BoA	Freak in Me	S.M. Entertainment	Composer		
2005	七朵花 (7 Flowers)	愛的黑眼圈 {Ài de hēi yǎnquān}	Warner Music Taiwan	Written by		
2006	Hady Mirza	You Give Me Wings	Universal	Written by	SGP 1	
2006	Emma Bunton	Downtown/Something Tells Me	19 Recordings	Production, mixed by, all instruments	UK 3	
2006	Emma Bunton	He Loves Me Not	19, Universal	Written by, mixed by, production, instruments		
2011	Rachel Philp	Summer Days	Girafe	Written by		
2011	Hope Hudson	Follow The Sun	Girafe	Written by		
2017	Psyrena	Butterfly	Kobalt, AWAL	Written by, production		
2017	Psyrena	Butterfly - Mr. Bear Mix	Kobalt, AWAL	Written by, production, remix		
2017	Psyrena	Silent Night (Redreamed)	Kobalt, AWAL	Written by, production		
2018	Psyrena	Sleep	Kobalt, AWAL	Written by, production		
2018	Psyrena	Sleep - Mr. Bear Mix	Kobalt, AWAL	Written by, production, remix		
2018	Psyrena	Siren Call	Kobalt, AWAL	Written by, production		
2019	Psyrena	Angels Never Sleep	Kobalt, AWAL	Written by, production		
2019	Psyrena	Snakeman	Kobalt, AWAL	Written by, production		
2020	Psyrena	Rainbows & Unicorns	Kobalt, AWAL	Written by, production		
2020	Psyrena	Jedi Master	Kobalt, AWAL	Written by, production	UK 10 CD	
2020	Psyrena	Christmas For One	Kobalt, AWAL	Written by, production		
2021	Psyrena	Ring Ring Ring	Kobalt, AWAL	Written by, production		

== Filmography ==
Year	Program/type	Credits
1988	Animal Traffic/Documentary (Title Song)	Drums, programmer
1988	Animal Traffic/EP1 - Skin	Composer
1988	Animal Traffic/EP2 - Taken From The Wild	Composer
1988	Animal Traffic/EP3 - A Taste for the Exotic	Composer
1988	Animal Traffic/EP4 - Out of Australia	Composer
1988	Animal Traffic/EP5 - 31 Tigers	Composer
1994	Time After Time/TV series	Composer
1998	Dil Se.../movie	Programmer
1999	Pokémon: Power of One/movie	Programmer
2002	The Royal Variety Performance 2002/television special	Arranger
2004	I Dream/television series	Composer
2004	Melodi Grand Prix (Eurovision Song Contest/Norway)	Composer
2004	Making Your Mind Up/TV Movie	Composer
2004	The Olympic Torch Concert Live/TV Special	Composer
2006	Body Electric/Show 1911	Composer, soundtrack
2016	Bliss!/movie	Composer, music department
2025	Köln 75	Music

== Live Performances/Touring ==
Year	Artist	Show/Event/Tour	Notes
1984	Eruption	Middle East Tour	keyboard & vocoder; Abu Dhabi, Kuwait, Bahrain
1990	Lisa Stansfield	All Around The World Tour	musical director & keyboards; 46 tour dates (UK, Europe, US); Arsenio Hall Show; David Letterman Show
1991	Lisa Stansfield	Rock in Rio 2	musical director & keyboards; live footage (part I); live footage (part II); live audience Maracanã stadium approx. 198,000; live broadcast Globo & MTV audience approx. 200 million
1991	Lisa Stansfield	Aspel & Company	TV Talk Show; musical director & grand piano
2002	Liberty X	Royal Variety Show	artist(s) perform License To Kill (arranger)
2002	Amy Studt	Top of the Pops	artist performs "Just A Little Girl" (writer/producer)
2003	Emma Bunton	Various Performances Launch "Maybe" (writer)	British Style Awards; Live @ T4; Royal Albert Hall; Top Of The Pops
2004	Rebecca	Melodi Grand Prix	Eurovision Song Contest; Norway National Finals; artist performs "A 1000 And One Nights" (writer)
2004 2005	Emma Bunton	Various Performances	The Olympic Torch Concert Live "Maybe" (writer); Top of the Pops "Crickets" (production); Top of the Pops "Tomorrow" (writer)
2007 2008	Spice Girls	The Return of the Spice Girls	artist performs "Maybe" (writer); artist performs "I Turn To You" (producer); Billboard Touring Award (Top Boxscore); Box Office $78.2 Million
