= Take Me Tonight =

Single by Alexander Klaws

from the album Take Your Chance
- Released: 17 March 2003
- Recorded: 2003
- Genre: Pop; Europop
- Length: 4:00
- Label: Hansa; Sony BMG
- Songwriter: Dieter Bohlen
- Producer: Dieter Bohlen

Alexander Klaws singles chronology
"Take Me Tonight" (2003)	"Stay with Me" (2003)

"Take Me Tonight" is a song by German recording artist Alexander Klaws, the winner of the inaugural season of the television competition Deutschland sucht den Superstar. Written and produced by DSDS judge Dieter Bohlen, it was released as both his coronation song and debut single. Upon its release, it debuted at number-one on the German and Swiss Singles Charts. The song was later included on his debut album, Take Your Chance (2003).

== Formats and track listings ==
CD Single
No.	Title	Length
1.	"Take Me Tonight" (Radio Edit)	4:00
2.	"Take Me Tonight" (Extended Version)	5:19
3.	"Take Me Tonight" (Instrumental)	4:00

== Credits and personnel ==
Credits taken from Take Your Chance liner notes.

- Lyrics, music, production – Dieter Bohlen
- Arrangement – Lalo Titenkov
- Bass – Peter Weihe
- Guitar – Peter Weihe
- Choir – Anja Mahnken, Billy King, Chris Bendorff, Madeleine Lang
- Artwork – Ronald Reinsberg
- Mixing – Jeo

== Charts ==
=== Weekly charts ===
Chart (2003)	Peak position
Austria (Ö3 Austria Top 40)	2
Germany (GfK)	1
Switzerland (Schweizer Hitparade)	1

=== Year-end charts ===
Chart (2003)	Position
Austria (Ö3 Austria Top 40)	8
Germany (Media Control GfK)	2
Switzerland (Schweizer Hitparade)	31

== Certifications ==
Region	Certification	Certified units/sales
Austria (IFPI Austria)	Platinum	30,000^{*}
Germany (BVMI)	5× Gold	750,000^{^}
Switzerland (IFPI Switzerland)	Gold	20,000^{^}
^{*} Sales figures based on certification alone.^{^} Shipments figures based on certification alone.
