= Alexander Klaws =

German singer and actor

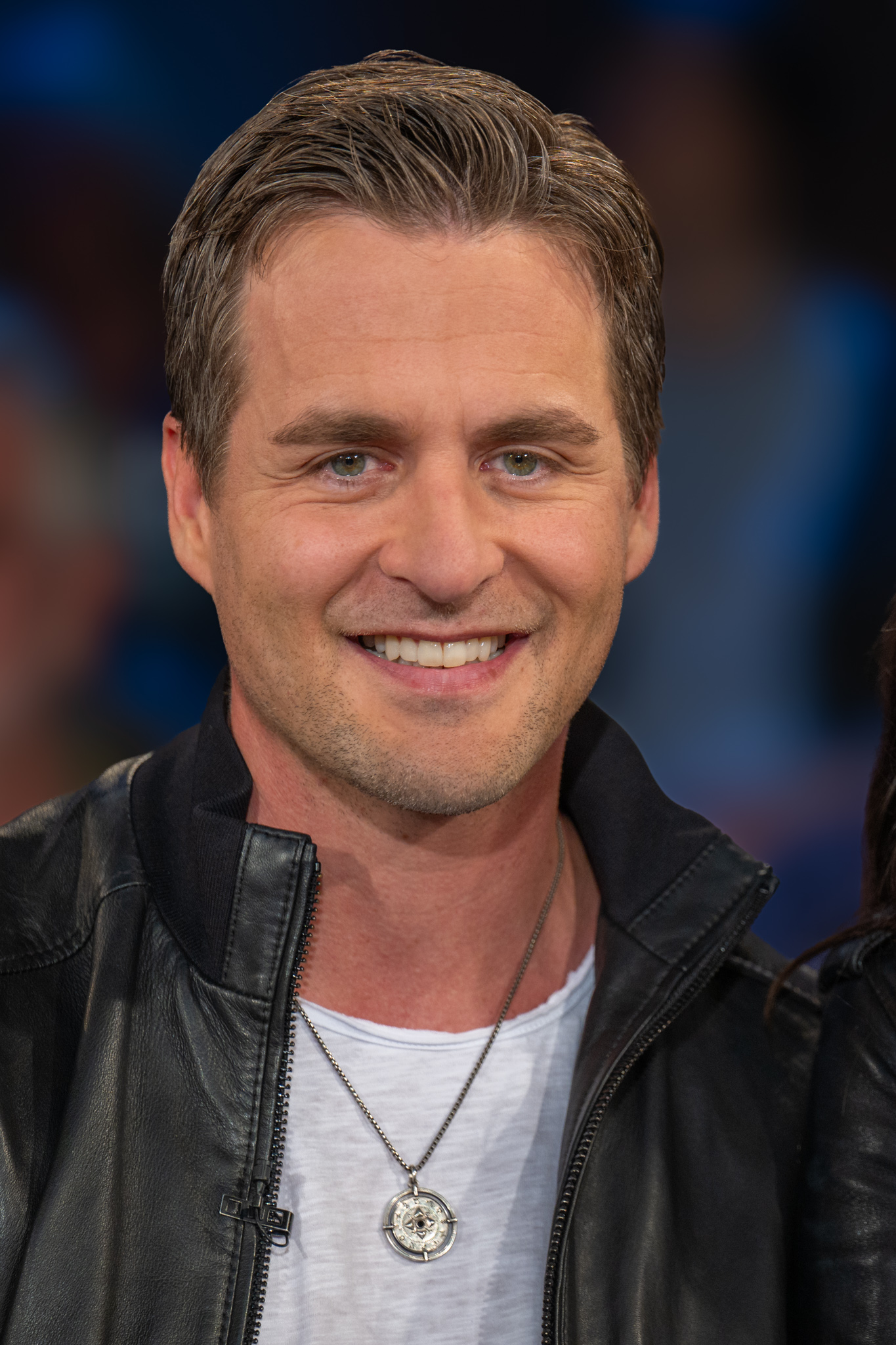
- Klaws in 2024.

Background information
- Born: Alexander Klaws; 3 September 1983 (age 42); Ahlen, West Germany
- Genres: Pop
- Occupations: Singer, actor
- Years active: 2002–present
- Label: Sony BMG
- Website: alexanderklaws.de

Alexander Klaws (born 3 September 1983) is a German singer, songwriter, actor, and television host. He rose to fame in 2003 after winning the debut season of the television series Deutschland sucht den Superstar, the German Idol series adaptation. His debut single "Take Me Tonight" topped the German and Swiss Singles Charts and became the third-best-selling single of 2003 in Germany. Klaws's debut studio album, Take Your Chance (2003), also debuted at number one on German Albums Chart. He followed it with his second number-one album Here I Am (2004) and has since released four further albums, including his latest effort Auf die Bühne, fertig, los! (2015). Several songs from these albums became hit singles on the pop charts, including the number-one hit "Free Like the Wind" as well as the top ten entries "Behind the Sun", "Sunshine After the Rain", and "Stay with Me".

Klaws ventured into acting in the mid-2000s, making his stage debut. Immediately after his study at the "Joop van den Ende Academie" debut at the Berlin Theater des Westens in 2006, playing the role of Alfred in the musical remake of the horror-comedy film Dance of the Vampires. He has since led several productions, having appeared as Tarzan in Tarzan, Jesus in Jesus Christ Superstar, Tony in Saturday Night Fever, and Sam in Ghost the Musical. In 2008, he originated the role of Lars Hauschke in the Sat.1 telenovela Anna und die Liebe. In 2013, Klaws hosted the music programme Goldschlager – Die Hits der Stars on Sat.1 Gold; the following year, he won the seventh season of the dance contest Let's Dance.

== Early life ==
Klaws was born in Ahlen and raised in nearby Sendenhorst to Richard and Hildegard Klaws. He has an older sister, Melanie (born 1980). He was an avid football player and still plays soccer on charity teams whenever he finds the time. Klaws's musical gifts became apparent when he was still in elementary school. He made his first television appearance at the age of 10, performing Haddaway's "What Is Love" on a national TV show for children. By the time he was 13, he was taking vocal and piano lessons to strengthen his voice.

== Career ==
=== 2002–2003: Deutschland sucht den Superstar ===
In 2002, Klaws was encouraged by his family and friends to audition for the debut season of the reality television series Deutschland sucht den Superstar. Although he was considered as one of the more inconspicuous top ten finalists at the very beginning of the show, he was able to boost his popularity constantly with standout performances of Robbie Williams' "Angels" or Michael Sembello's "Maniac". Klaws went on to win the competition on 8 March 2003, earning 70.1% of the votes against runner-up Juliette Schoppmann and without being sent into the bottom three throughout the season.

Immediately after winning DSDS, Klaws was signed to a record deal with Sony BMG, while jury member Dieter Bohlen was consulted to produce his debut album on the company. On 17 March 2003 his debut single, "Take Me Tonight" was released. The song was performed by Klaws during the season finale of DSDS. The song subsequently debuted at number 1 in Germany and Switzerland. It eventually went on to become the second best-selling single of 2002 behind "We Have a Dream" and was certified quintuple gold by the Bundesverband Musikindustrie (BVMI). In May he followed up with his debut album Take Your Chance, which saw similar success and spawned a second single "Stay with Me". At the end of a year he entered the top of the charts again with "Free Like the Wind", the soundtrack to the German TV movie Hero of the Gladiators.

On 25 December 2003, Klaws participated in the television special competition World Idol in London along the inaugural winners of the several Idol television series around the world. He was contractually obligated to participate, and performed Michael Sembello's "Maniac". On 1 January 2004 he finished ninth in the competition.

Week #	Theme	Song choice	Original artist	Order #	Result
Top 30	Semi-finals	"Angels"	Robbie Williams	1/10	29.0%
Top 10	My Idol	"Every Breath You Take"	Sting & The Police	4/10	8.1%
Top 9	Love Songs	"Hello"	Lionel Richie	5/9	6.2%
Top 8	Hits of 2002	"If Tomorrow Never Comes"	Ronan Keating	3/8	17.6%
Top 7	Musicals	"Starlight Express"	Starlight Express	4/7	15.2%
Top 6	Songs of the 1980s	"Right Here Waiting"	Richard Marx	2/6	21.2%
Top 5	Big Band	"Mack the Knife"	Frank Sinatra	12/5	24.9%
Top 4	Songs of the 1970s	"Maniac" "Relight My Fire"	Michael Sembello; Dan Hartman	1/4	36.9%
Top 3	Movie Hits	"I Believe I Can Fly" "You Can Leave Your Hat On"	R. Kelly; Joe Cocker	1/3	40.5%
Top 2	Finale	"She's the One" "Maniac" "Take Me Tonight"	Robbie Williams; Michael Sembello; Alexander Klaws	1/2	70.1%

=== 2004–2006: Career development ===
Here I Am, Klaws's second album, was released in July 2004. A musical continuation of his commercially successful debut, he worked with a small number of new collaborators on the album apart from Bohlen, including Yak Bondy, Ingo Politz, and Brix. Like its predecessor, the album debuted atop the German Albums Chart and reached the top ten in Austria and Switzerland, but it ultimately failed to live up to the overwhelming success of his debut album. In spite of this, the album managed to snag Klaws another three hit singles, including the top five hits "Behind the Sun" and "Sunshine After the Rain" as well as the top 20 entry "Here I Am". Also in 2004, Klaws was cast in a supporting role in an episode of the German television series Das Traumhotel, filmed in Bali and broadcast the following year.

In March 2005, he recorded and released the duet "All (I Ever Want)", an English version of the 3 Musketiers theme song featuring vocals from German singer Sabrina Weckerlin. The original version of the duet, "Alles" was released to promote the RTL television film Hero of the Gladiators (2003). The English version of the song peaked at number 12 on the German Singles Chart was later included on his third album, Attention! (2006). Recorded after a short-living hiatus from recording in which she had studied song and acting at the Joop van den Ende Academie in Hamburg, it marked a departure from Klaws's previous work with Bohlen, who gained no credit on the record. Instead, Klaws consulted a wider range of producers to work with him on the album, including Terri Bjerre, Thorsten Brötzmann, and Ivo Moring, who took his work further into the pop rock genre. Upon its release, Attention! became a top 20 success in Austria and Germany only, prompting Sony BMG not to release another single from the album.

=== 2007–present: Musical theatre ===
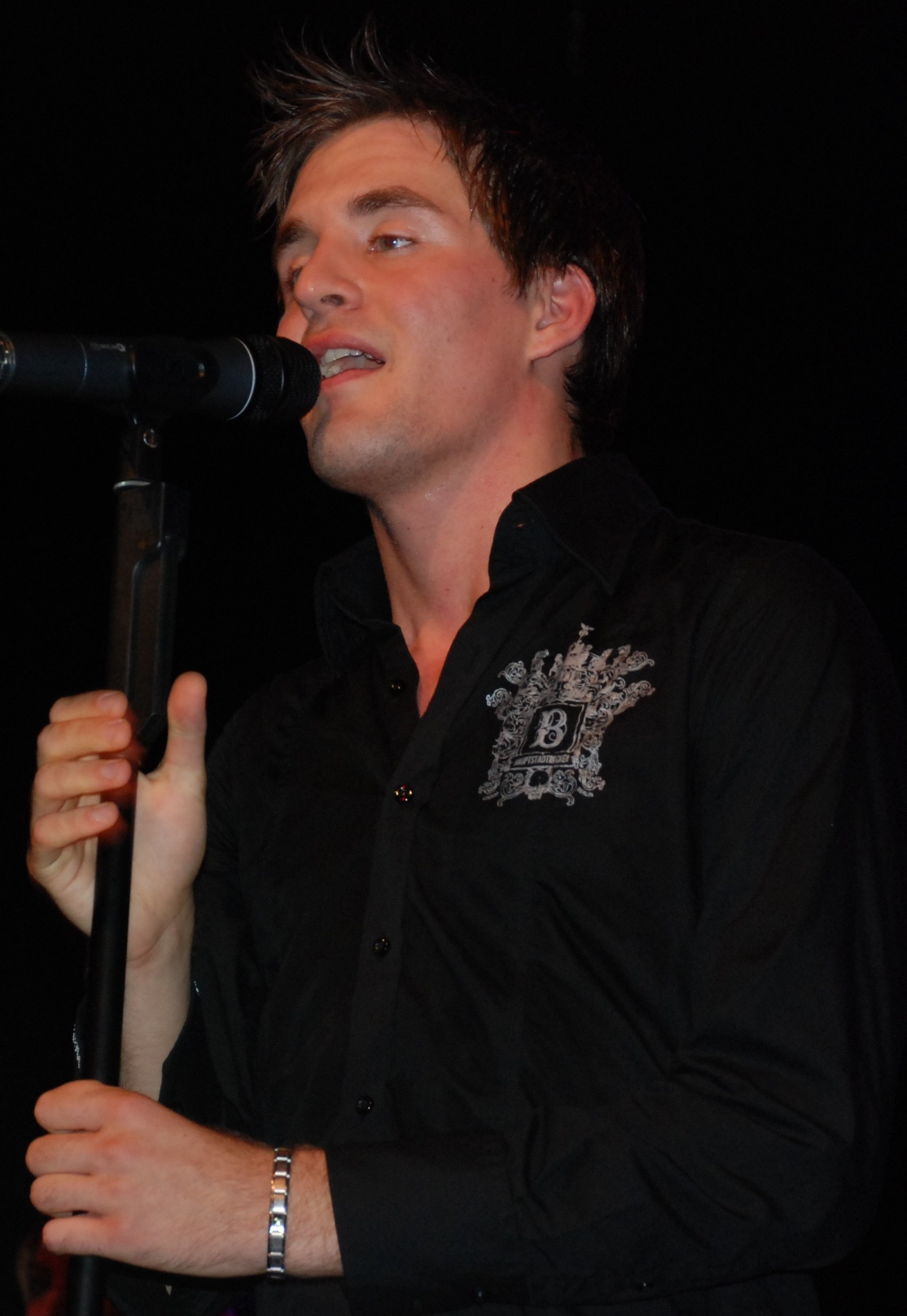
Klaws performing in 2008

In December 2006, Klaws made his musical theatre debut at the Theater des Westens stage in Berlin in 2006, playing the role of Alfred in the musical remake of Roman Polanski's satirical horror drama Dance of the Vampires (1967). Following the conclusion of his management and recording contract, he signed a new deal with Cruiser Entertainment which released his fourth album Was willst du noch?! through Edel Music in April 2008. His first album to be primarily recorded in German, it peaked at number 28 on the German Albums Chart and produced two singles. In 2010, Klaws took over the role of Tarzan in the Neue Flora Hamburg production of the same-titled musical based on the Walt Disney Animation Studios 1999 film of the same name. Running for five years, it closed in 2013.

Klaws collaborated with frequent collaborators Thorsten Brötzmann and Ivo Moringa on his fifth album Für alle Zeiten. Released in September 2011, it reached the top fifty of the German Albums Chart and produced several singles, including "Himmel und Hölle". In April 2013, he served as a supporting act throughout the German leg of British singer Leona Lewis's Glassheart Tour. The same year, Klaws played the role of Ranger in the musical version of the German comedy film Der Schuh des Manitu at the Freilichtbühne Tecklenburg. He returned to Tecklenburg the following year, portraying Joseph in a local production of Andrew Lloyd Webber's Joseph and the Amazing Technicolor Dreamcoat. He followed it with a role at the Theater Dortmund, starring as Jesus in an adaptation of Lloyd Webber's rock opera Jesus Christ Superstar.

Klaws fifth studio album Auf die Bühne, fertig, los! was released in October 2015 and reached the top forty of the German Albums Chart. In 2016, he reprised both of his roles as Jesus and Tarzan at the Theater Basel and at the Metronom Theater in Oberhausen, respectively. Also that year, he starred as Tony Manero in a local production of Saturday Night Fever at the Freilichtbühne Tecklenburg. In summer 2017, he played Old Surehand at the Karl May Festival in Bad Segeberg. In December 2017, he originated the role of Sam in the German version of Ghost the Musical, based on the hit 1990 romantic fantasy thriller film of the same name, for which he returned to the Theater des Westens stage in Berlin.

In 2021, Klaws won the fifth season of The Masked Singer.

== Discography ==
Studio albums

- Take Your Chance (2003)
- Here I Am (2004)
- Attention! (2006)
- Was willst du noch?! (2008)
- Für alle Zeiten (2011)
- Auf die Bühne, fertig, los! (2015)

== Stage ==
Year	Title	Role	Notes
2006–2008	Tanz der Vampire	Alfred	Theater des Westens, Berlin
2010–2013	Tarzan	Tarzan	Neue Flora, Hamburg
2013	Der Schuh des Manitu	Ranger	Freilichtbühne Tecklenburg
2013	Joseph and the Amazing Technicolor Dreamcoat	Joseph	Freilichtbühne Tecklenburg
2014–2015	Jesus Christ Superstar	Jesus	Opernhaus Dortmund, Dortmund
2016	Jesus Christ Superstar	Jesus	Theater Basel, Basel
2016	Saturday Night Fever	Tony Manero	Freilichtbühne Tecklenburg
2016–2017	Tarzan	Tarzan	Metronom Theater, Oberhausen
2017	Karl May Festival in Bad Segeberg	Old Surehand	Kalkberg Stadium, Bad Segeberg
2017–2018	Ghost the Musical	Sam	Theater des Westens, Berlin

Preceded by None	Deutschland sucht den Superstar; Winner; Season 1 (2003)	Succeeded by Elli Erl
