= We Have a Dream (Deutschland sucht den Superstar song) =

2002 single from the show Deutschland sucht den Superstar

Single by Deutschland sucht den Superstar

from the album United
- Released: 23 December 2002
- Recorded: December 2002
- Length: 4:01
- Label: Hansa
- Songwriter(s): Dieter Bohlen
- Producer(s): Dieter Bohlen

Deutschland sucht den Superstar singles chronology
"We Have a Dream" (2002)	"Believe in Miracles" (2003)

Audio
- "We Have a Dream" on YouTube

"We Have a Dream" is a song from the first series of German reality talent show Deutschland sucht den Superstar (DSDS). Written and produced by contest judge Dieter Bohlen, the song is performed by the first series' final 10 contestants, who were credited by the programme's name for the single release. The 10 vocalists on the song are Daniel Lopes, Stephanie Brauckmeyer, Daniel Küblböck, Andrea Josten, Vanessa Struhler, Alexander Klaws, Nektarios Bamiatzis, Judith Lefeber, Gracia Baur, and Juliette Schoppmann.

After the finalists performed the song on the show, "We Have a Dream" was released as a single in Germany on 23 December 2002, debuting atop the German Singles Chart in January 2003 and staying there for six weeks, becoming Germany's highest-selling single of 2003 and the 100th-most-successful single of the 2000s decade. The song was included as the opening track on the finalists' studio album, United, released later the same year. In 2004, the song won an Echo Music Prize for Single of the Year (National).

== Background and release ==
The first series of DSDS premiered on RTL in November 2002, and by the end of December, 10 participants remained: Daniel Lopes, Stephanie Brauckmeyer, Daniel Küblböck, Andrea Josten, Vanessa Struhler, Alexander Klaws, Nektarios Bamiatzis, Judith Lefeber, Gracia Baur, and Juliette Schoppmann. With the final 10 selected, contest judge Dieter Bohlen quickly recorded and produced a song he had written for the contestants: "We Have a Dream". After the group performed the song on the programme, record label Hansa Records issued the song as a CD single on 23 December 2002, crediting the final 10 as "Deutschland sucht den Superstar". The single contains three versions of the track: a radio edit, an extended version, and an instrumental.

== Chart performance ==
On 13 January 2003, "We Have a Dream" debuted at number one on the German Singles Chart, staying at the position for six weeks before falling to number two on the chart dated 24 February 2003. The song spent 10 more weeks in the top 100, totalling 17 weeks on the German chart and earning a triple-gold certification from the Bundesverband Musikindustrie (BVMI) for shipments of over 750,000 copies in Germany alone. At the end of 2003, the song came in at number one on the German year-end chart, one position ahead of contest winner Klaws' "Take Me Tonight". "We Have a Dream" also reached number one in Switzerland, where it topped the Swiss Hitparade for one week and stayed in the top 100 for 16 weeks. It finished 2003 at number 70 on the Swiss year-end chart and was certified platinum for shipping over 40,000 units. In Austria, the single reached number two for five weeks, remained on the chart for 19 weeks, ranked in at number 12 on the 2003 year-end listing, and earned a gold certification, denoting sales of over 15,000. With its combined European sales, "We Have a Dream" peaked at number eight on the Eurochart Hot 100. In 2009, the track was ranked at number 100 on Germany's decade-end chart.

== Credits and personnel ==
Credits are taken from the CD single liner notes and the United booklet.

Studio

- Mixed at Jeopark (Hamburg, Germany)

Personnel

- Dieter Bohlen – music, lyrics, production
- Daniel Lopes – vocals
- Stephanie Brauckmeyer – vocals
- Daniel Küblböck – vocals
- Andrea Josten – vocals
- Vanessa Struhler – vocals
- Alexander Klaws – vocals
- Nektarios Bamiatzis – vocals
- Judith Lefeber – vocals
- Gracia Baur – vocals
- Juliette Schoppmann – vocals
- Lalo Titenkov – arrangement
- Jeo – mixing

== Charts ==
=== Weekly charts ===
Chart (2003)	Peak position
Austria (Ö3 Austria Top 40)	2
Europe (Eurochart Hot 100)	8
Germany (GfK)	1
Switzerland (Schweizer Hitparade)	1

=== Year-end charts ===
Chart (2003)	Position
Austria (Ö3 Austria Top 40)	12
Germany (Media Control GfK)	1
Switzerland (Schweizer Hitparade)	70

=== Decade-end charts ===
Chart (2000–2009)	Position
Germany (Media Control GfK)	100

== Certifications ==
Region	Certification	Certified units/sales
Austria (IFPI Austria)	Gold	15,000^{*}
Germany (BVMI)	3× Gold	750,000^{^}
Switzerland (IFPI Switzerland)	Platinum	40,000^{^}
^{*} Sales figures based on certification alone.^{^} Shipments figures based on certification alone.
