= Intoxicated (album) =

Studio album by Gracia
- Released: October 13, 2003
- Recorded: 2003
- Length: 39:08
- Label: BMG

Gracia chronology
Intoxicated (2003)	Passion (2005)

Intoxicated is the debut studio album by German recording artist Gracia. It was released by BMG on October 13, 2003, in German-speaking Europe, following her participation in the debut season of Deutschland sucht den Superstar, where she had finished fifth. Taking her work further into the hard rock and pop rock genres, Gracia worked with a small team of collaborators on the album, including duos Christian Hamm and Alain Bertoni as well as Grant Michael B. and Pomez di Lorenzo, among others. Its release was preceded by the singles "I Don’t Think So!" and "I Believe in Miracles", a top ten and a top 20 entry on the German Singles Chart, respectively.

== Reception ==
Professional ratings
Review scores
Source	Rating
laut.de	2/5 stars

The album received mixed reviews from critics, with Mathias Möller from laut.de calling it a collection of "shallow pop songs for underage braces carriers", but enjoyed commercial success, debuting and peaking at number 10 on the German Albums Chart. With sales in excess of 50,000 copies, Intoxicated became third highest-selling album released by a first season DSDS finalist – only behind Alexander Klaws's Take Your Chance (2003) and Daniel Küblböck's Positive Energie (2003). However, lackluster sales resulted into the release of no further singles and the termination of her recording contract with BMG, making Intoxicated her only album with the label.

== Track listing ==
Credits adapted from the liner notes of Intoxicated.

Intoxicated track listing
No.	Title	Writer(s)	Producer(s)	Length
1.	"Intoxicated"	Jonas Krag; Giovanni Gambino	Christian Hamm; Alain Bertoni	3:41
2.	"I Don't Think So!"	Andreas Karlegård; Daniel Thornqvist; Niclas Lundin; Adam Alvermark	Brix; Ingo P.	2:54
3.	"One Man to the Left"	Hamm; Bertoni; Laura Zonka	Hamm; Bertoni	3:22
4.	"Superman"	Hamm; Bertoni; Zonka	Hamm; Bertoni	3:21
5.	"I Believe in Miracles"	Tommy La Verdi; Daniel Pandher; Ear	ORec	3:15
6.	"Cry the Blues"	Grant Michael B.; Pomez di Lorenzo	Michael B.; di Lorenzo	3:44
7.	"Right by Your Side"	Svein Finneide; Ear	ORec	3:29
8.	"Send Me an Angel"	Hamm; Bertoni	Hamm; Bertoni	3:31
9.	"Will You Be My Friend?"	Michael B.; di Lorenzo	Michael B.; di Lorenzo	3:59
10.	"Back into My Life"	Hamm; Bertoni	Hamm; Bertoni	3:57
11.	"When the Love Is Gone"	Michael B.; di Lorenzo	Michael B.; di Lorenzo	3:48
12.	"Don’t Turn Your Back on Me"	Michael B.; di Lorenzo	Michael B.; di Lorenzo	3:59
Total length:				39:08

== Charts ==
Weekly chart performance for Intoxicated
Chart (2003)	Peak position
German Albums (Offizielle Top 100)	10
Swiss Albums (Schweizer Hitparade)	67
