= In My Dreams =

In My Dreams may refer to:

== Film and television ==
- In My Dreams (film), a 2014 television film
- In My Dreams, a 2023 Philippine TV series featuring Allen Ansay

== Music ==
=== Albums ===
- In My Dreams (Bill Frisell album) or the title song, 2026
- In My Dreams (Daryl Coley album) or the title song, 1994
- In My Dreams (Judith Lefeber album), 2003
- In My Dreams (Military Wives album) or the title song, 2012
- In My Dreams (Rick Trevino album) or the title song, 2003

=== Songs ===
- "In My Dreams" (Danny L Harle song), 2014
- "In My Dreams" (Dokken song), 1986
- "In My Dreams" (Emmylou Harris song), 1984
- "In My Dreams" (REO Speedwagon song), 1987
- "In My Dreams" (Wig Wam song), 2004
- "In My Dreams!", by the Aquabats from Hi-Five Soup!, 2011
- "In My Dreams", by Berlin from Love Life, 1984
- "In My Dreams", by Crosby, Stills & Nash from CSN, 1977
- "In My Dreams", by Dark Funeral from Angelus Exuro pro Eternus, 2009
- "In My Dreams", by DJ Antoine, 2009
- "In My Dreams", by Dream from It Was All a Dream, 2001
- "In My Dreams", by Eels from Hombre Lobo, 2009
- "In My Dreams", by James Morrison from The Awakening, 2011
- "In My Dreams", by Josh Turner from Long Black Train, 2003
- "In My Dreams", by Kali Uchis from Isolation, 2018
- "In My Dreams", by Lionel Richie from Just for You, 2004
- "In My Dreams", by Pat Benatar from Go, 2003
- "In My Dreams", by Red Velvet from The ReVe Festival 2022 – Feel My Rhythm, 2022
- "In My Dreams", by Tonight Alive from Underworld, 2018
- "In My Dreams", by Will Downing, 1988
- "In My Dreams", from the musical Anastasia, 2016
- "In My Dreams (Cudder Anthem)", by Kid Cudi from Man on the Moon: The End of Day, 2009
- "Mere Khwabon Mein" (lit. 'In My Dreams'), by Jatin–Lalit and Lata Mangeshkar from the 1995 Indian film Dilwale Dulhania Le Jayenge

== See also ==
- In Dreams (disambiguation)
- "In My Dream (With Shiver)", a 1993 song by Luna Sea
- "In My Dream", a song by Super Junior from Bonamana, 2010
- In Your Dreams (disambiguation)
- Only in My Dreams (disambiguation)
