= Germany in the Eurovision Song Contest 2005 =

- Eurovision Song Contest 2005
- Participating broadcaster: ARD – Norddeutscher Rundfunk (NDR)
- Country: Germany
- Selection process: Germany 12 Points!
- Selection date: 12 March 2005

Competing entry
- Song: "Run & Hide"
- Artist: Gracia
- Songwriters: David Brandes; Jane Tempest; John O'Flynn

Placement
- Final result: 24th, 4 points

Participation chronology

Germany was represented at the Eurovision Song Contest 2005 with the song "Run & Hide", composed by David Brandes and Jane Tempest, with lyrics by John O'Flynn, and performed by Gracia. The German participating broadcaster on behalf of ARD, Norddeutscher Rundfunk (NDR), organised the national final Germany 12 Points! in order to select their entry for the contest. The national final took place on 12 March 2005 and featured ten competing acts with the winner being selected through two rounds of public televoting. "Run & Hide" performed by Gracia was selected as the German entry for Eurovision after placing second in the top two during the first round of voting and ultimately gaining 52.8% of the votes in the second round.

As a member of the "Big Four", Germany automatically qualified to compete in the final of the Eurovision Song Contest. Performing in position 17, Germany placed twenty-fourth (last) out of the 24 participating countries with 4 points.

== Background ==
Prior to the 2005 Contest, ARD had participated in the Eurovision Song Contest representing Germany forty-eight times since its debut in 1956. It has won the contest on one occasion: in 1982 with the song "Ein bißchen Frieden" performed by Nicole. Germany, to this point, has been noted for having appeared in the contest more than any other country; they have competed in every contest since the first edition in 1956 except for 1996 when it was eliminated in a pre-contest elimination round. In 2004, the German entry "Can't Wait Until Tonight" performed by Max placed eighth out of twenty-four competing songs scoring 93 points.

As part of its duties as participating broadcaster, ARD organises the selection of its entry in the Eurovision Song Contest and broadcasts the event in the country. Since 1996, ARD had delegated the participation in the contest to its member Norddeutscher Rundfunk (NDR). NDR confirmed that it would participate in the 2005 contest on 21 September 2004. Since 1996, NDR had set up national finals with several artists to choose both the song and performer to compete at Eurovision for Germany. The broadcaster also announced that they would organise a multi-artist national final to select the 2005 entry.

== Before Eurovision ==
=== Germany 12 Points! ===
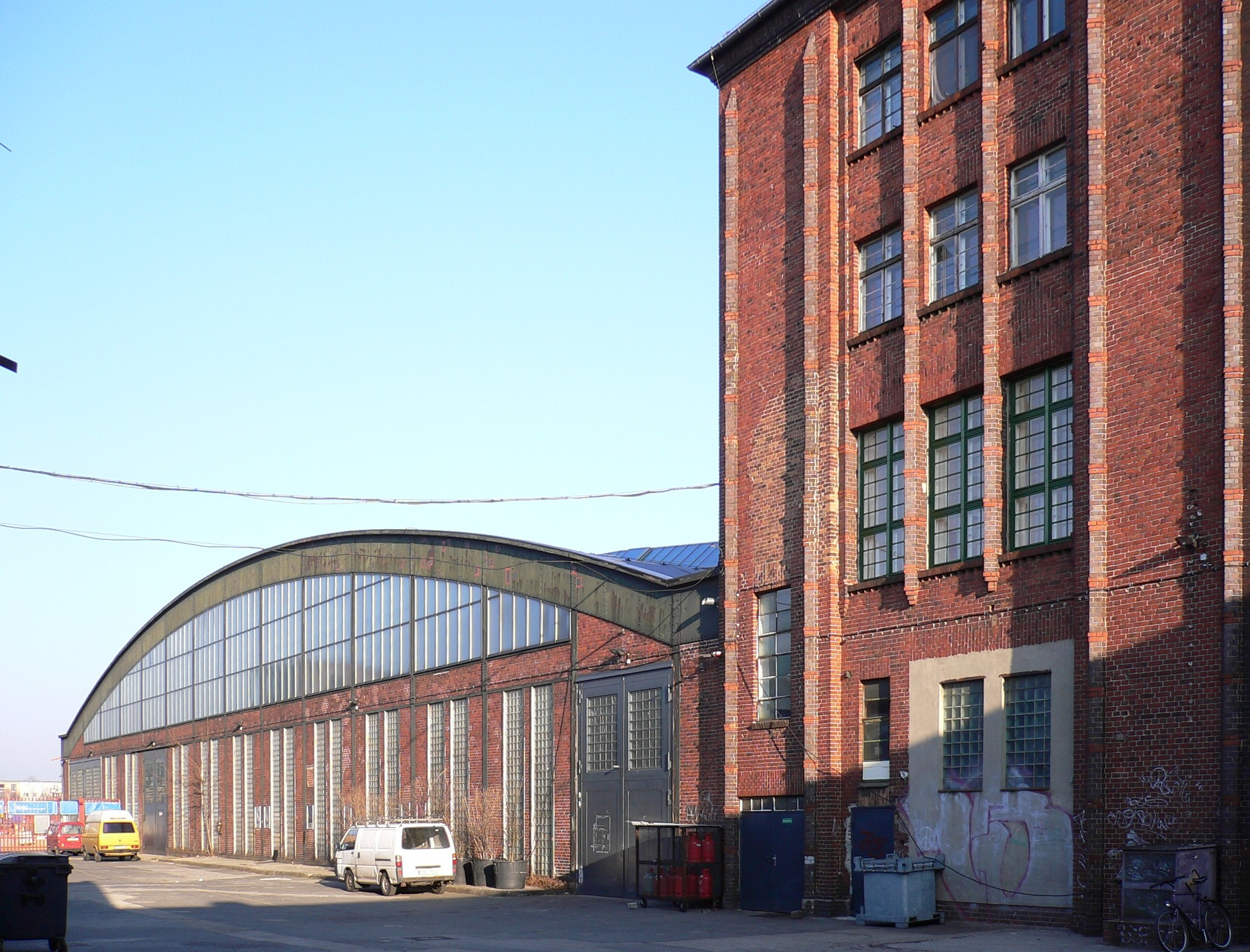
The Treptow Arena in Berlin was the host venue of Germany 12 Points! in 2005

Germany 12 Points! was the competition organised by NDR to select its entry for the Eurovision Song Contest 2005. The competition took place on 12 March 2005 at the Treptow Arena in Berlin, hosted by Reinhold Beckmann. Ten acts competed during the show with the winner being selected through a public televote. The show was broadcast on Das Erste as well as online via the broadcaster's Eurovision Song Contest website eurovision.de. The national final was watched by 3.56 million viewers in Germany with a market share of 11.2%.

==== Competing entries ====
Nine acts were selected by a panel consisting of representatives of NDR from proposals received by the broadcaster from record companies. The nine competing artists were announced on 27 January 2005, and Gracia was announced as the tenth act on 9 February 2005 after being selected by NDR as a wildcard due to her top 40 placement in the German singles charts in early 2005.

==== Final ====
The televised final took place on 12 March 2005. The winner was selected through two rounds of public televoting, including options for landline and SMS voting. In the first round of voting, the top two entries were selected to proceed to the second round. In the second round, the winner, "Run & Hide" performed by Gracia, was selected. In addition to the performances of the competing entries, Ruslana (who won Eurovision for Ukraine in 2004) performed her song "Wild Passion", while American musician Al Di Meola together with Russian singer Leonid Agutin performed their song "Cosmopolitan Life", British singer Emma Bunton performed her song "Maybe" and French singer Patricia Kaas performed her song "Das Herz eines Kampfers".

First Round – 12 March 2005
| R/O | Artist | Song | Songwriter(s) | Televote | Place |
|---|---|---|---|---|---|
| 1 | The Murphy Brothers | "Picking Up the Pieces" | Andrew Murphy, Stephen Murphy | — | — |
| 2 | Ellen ten Damme | "Plattgeliebt" | Udo Lindenberg | — | — |
| 3 | Orange Blue | "A Million Teardrops" | Volkan Baydar, Fontaine Burnett, Bülent Aris | — | — |
| 4 | Königwerq | "Unschlagbar" | Dania König, Mathias Kiefer | — | — |
| 5 | Villaine | "Adrenalin" | Peter Power, Ully Jonas, Vera Viehöfer | — | — |
| 6 | Allee der Kosmonauten | "Dein Lied" | Mischa Marin | 14.10% | 3 |
| 7 | Nicole Süßmilch and Marco Matias | "A Miracle of Love" | Ralph Siegel, John O'Flynn | 22.69% | 1 |
| 8 | Gracia | "Run & Hide" | David Brandes, Jane Tempest, John O'Flynn | 16.70% | 2 |
| 9 | Stefan Gwildis | "Wunderschönes Grau" | Stefan Gwildis, Michy Reincke | — | — |
| 10 | Mia Aegerter | "Alive" | Mia Aegerter, Julian Feifel | — | — |

Second Round – 12 March 2005
| R/O | Artist | Song | Televote | Place |
|---|---|---|---|---|
| 1 | Nicole Süßmilch and Marco Matias | "A Miracle of Love" | 47.2% | 2 |
| 2 | Gracia | "Run & Hide" | 52.8% | 1 |

=== Controversy ===
Following Gracia's victory at the German national final, it was revealed that her producer David Brandes had been commanded by his record company to manipulate the German singles charts by buying numerous copies of songs, including "Run & Hide", so they would chart in a higher place. The song, which ultimately charted in the top 40 and led to NDR awarding Gracia a wildcard for the national final, received a three-week ban from the chart listing. National final runner-up Marco Matias later accused NDR of vote rigging, while several former German Eurovision entrants petitioned against Gracia's participation in the contest following the charts manipulation reveal. Head of German delegation for Eurovision Jürgen Meier-Beer later stated that Gracia and "Run & Hide" would remain as the German entry for the 2005 Eurovision Song Contest as there were no signs that the public would have voted in another way if the song did not become a top 40 hit.

== At Eurovision ==
According to Eurovision rules, all nations with the exceptions of the host country and the "Big Four" (France, Germany, Spain and the United Kingdom) are required to qualify from the semi-final in order to compete for the final; the top ten countries from the semi-final progress to the final. As a member of the "Big Four", Germany automatically qualified to compete in the final on 21 May 2005. In addition to their participation in the final, Germany is also required to broadcast and vote in the semi-final. The running order for the final in addition to the semi-final was decided through an allocation draw on 22 March 2005, and Germany was subsequently drawn to perform in position 17, following the entry from Ukraine and before the entry from Croatia. At the conclusion of the final, Germany placed twenty-fourth (last) in the final, scoring 4 points.

In Germany, the two shows were broadcast on Das Erste which featured commentary by Peter Urban, as well as on Deutschlandfunk and NDR 2 which featured commentary by Thomas Mohr. The show was watched by 7.01 million viewers in Germany, which meant a market share of 29.8 per cent. NDR appointed Thomas Hermanns as its spokesperson to announce the top 12-point score awarded by the German televote during the final.

=== Voting ===
Below is a breakdown of points awarded to Germany and awarded by Germany in the semi-final and grand final of the contest, and the breakdown of the voting conducted during the two shows. Germany awarded its 12 points to Portugal in the semi-final and to Greece in the grand final of the contest.

==== Points awarded to Germany ====
Points awarded to Germany (Final)
| Score | Country |
|---|---|
| 12 points | |
| 10 points | |
| 8 points | |
| 7 points | |
| 6 points | |
| 5 points | |
| 4 points | |
| 3 points | |
| 2 points | Moldova; Monaco |
| 1 point | |

==== Points awarded by Germany ====
Points awarded by Germany (Semi-final)
| Score | Country |
|---|---|
| 12 points | Portugal |
| 10 points | Croatia |
| 8 points | Poland |
| 7 points | Romania |
| 6 points | Switzerland |
| 5 points | Denmark |
| 4 points | Finland |
| 3 points | Israel |
| 2 points | Macedonia |
| 1 point | Austria |

Points awarded by Germany (Final)
| Score | Country |
|---|---|
| 12 points | Greece |
| 10 points | Turkey |
| 8 points | Malta |
| 7 points | Latvia |
| 6 points | Denmark |
| 5 points | Israel |
| 4 points | Switzerland |
| 3 points | Serbia and Montenegro |
| 2 points | Croatia |
| 1 point | Moldova |
