= Ride with Me =

Ride with Me may refer to:

- "Ride wit Me", a 2001 song by Nelly
- "Ride with Me" (Steppenwolf song), 1971
- "Ride With Me" (Hey! Say! JUMP song), 2013
- Ride with Me (album), an album by Vanessa Struhler
- Ride with Me, a 2015 album by Baha Men
- "Ride with Me", a 2021 single by Tungevaag featuring Kid Ink
- "Ride with Me", a song by Jay Chou from the 2007 album Secret
- "Ride Wit Me", a song by MC Lyte from the 2003 album Da Undaground Heat, Vol. 1
- "Ride wit Me", a song by Big K.R.I.T. featuring Bun B and Pimp C from the 2017 album 4eva Is a Mighty Long Time
- "Ride Wimme", a song by Aitch from the 2025 album 4
