= Unique (Juliette Schoppmann album) =

Studio album by Juliette Schoppmann
- Released: February 9, 2004
- Length: 45:07
- Label: BMG-Ariola
- Producer: Stephen Lipson; Pete Martin; Peter Ries

Singles from Unique
- 1. "Calling You" Released: June 22, 2003; 2. "Only Uh, Uh,..." Released: October 13, 2003; 3. "I Still Believe" Released: January 12, 2004

Unique is the debut studio album by German recording artist Juliette Schoppmann. It was released by BMG-Ariola on February 9, 2004 in German-speaking Europe, following Schoppmann's participation in the first season of Deutschland sucht den Superstar, where she had finished second the previous year. Production on the album was chiefly handled by Peter Ries, while Stephen Lipson and Pete Martin contributed additional tracks. Songs were penned by Jörgen Elofsson, Toby Gad, Yak Bondy, Sheppard Solomon, Jade Anderson and Greg Wells among others.

Initially scheduled for a 2003 release, the album garnered a generally mixed reception from music critics upon its release and peaked at number 15 on the German Albums Chart. With a domestic sales total of 40,000 copies, it widely failed to satisfy the label's commercial expectations, resulting in the termination of Schoppmann's contract with the record company only four months after its release. Unique was preceded by three singles, including a cover version of the Jevetta Steele classic "Calling You", "Only Uh, Uh,..." and the ballad "I Still Believe".

== Promotion ==
The album was preceded by the release of three singles between 2003 and 2004. The lead single, "Calling You," a cover of the same-titled 1988 classic by American singer Jevetta Steele, became the album's most commercially successful release in Switzerland and Austria, peaking at number 10 on the German Singles Chart, number 23 in Switzerland, and number 56 in Austria. It was followed by "Only Uh, Uh,...," co-written by Tina Harris, which reached number 60 in Germany and number 72 in Switzerland. The third single, "I Still Believe," co-penned by Jörgen Elofsson, performed particularly strongly in Germany, peaking at number nine on the German Singles Chart, thereby outperforming "Calling You" in its German chart position, while also reaching number 100 in Switzerland.

== Critical reception ==
Professional ratings
Review scores
Source	Rating
laut.de	2/5 stars

Vicky Butscher from laut.de complimented the first half of the album but wrote that from "halfway point of the album, the tracks slow down noticeably. With "Paperball" Juliette returns to the love ballad universe. "Calling You" adds stupid lyrics. After all, er voice shows another facet – that of the unapproachable diva. You can't expect much new from Frau Schoppmann on the rest of the album. Unfortunately." Berliner Zeitung described Unique as a stylistically varied debut, balancing ballads, R&B, and dance-oriented tracks in line with typical releases from early Deutschland sucht den Superstar contestants. While acknowledging a familiar pop framework, the review emphasized Schoppmann's "saturated vocals," which were seen as giving each track a distinct sense of style and individuality. Overall, the album was characterised as "catchy but not plastic pop," suggesting a polished production with a recognizable personal touch.

== Commercial performance ==
Unique achieved moderate commercial success in German-speaking countries following its release in 2004. The album peaked at number 15 on the German Albums Chart and reached number 74 on the Swiss Albums Chart. It remained on the German Albums Chart for a total of four weeks. Unique also marked Schoppmann's final album released under the label, following the termination of her contract by Sony BMG amid the departure of Thomas Stein, who had served as Sony BMG's managing director, from the company.

== Track listing ==
Unique track listing
No.	Title	Writer(s)	Producer(s)	Length
1.	"I Still Believe"	Jörgen Elofsson; John Reid; Peer Åström	Peter Ries	4:35
2.	"From Heart to Heart"	Tobias Gad; Kemba Francis	Ries	3:22
3.	"Where the Story Begins"	Yak Bondy; Sheppard Solomon; Jennifer Karr	Ries	3:30
4.	"Only Uh, Uh,..."	Steve Lee; Pete Martin; Tina Harris	Martin	3:57
5.	"Paper Doll"	Joleen Belle; Steven Smith; Anthony Anderson; Jade Anderson	Ries	3:45
6.	"Calling You"	Bob Telson	Ries	5:16
7.	"I Don't Wanna Fall in Love Again"	Gad; Heather Smith	Ries	3:56
8.	"Il faut du temps"	Patrick Bruel; Rick Allison; Marie-Florence Gros	Ries	3:59
9.	"Feel Like a Woman"	Kim Sanders; Philipp Palm; Ronald Kool	Ries	3:12
10.	"Hold On"	Alexa Phazer	Ries	4:25
11.	"When We Say Goodbye"	Greg Wells; Katherine Davis	Stephen Lipson	5:12
Total length:				45:07

== Charts ==
Chart performance for Unique
Chart (2004)	Peak position
German Albums (Offizielle Top 100)	15
Swiss Albums (Schweizer Hitparade)	74
