= I Still Believe =

I Still Believe may refer to:

- I Still Believe (album), by Lyfe Jennings, 2010
- I Still Believe (film), a 2020 American film based on the life of singer Jeremy Camp

== Songs ==
- "I Still Believe" (Brenda K. Starr song), 1988; covered by Mariah Carey, 1999
- "I Still Believe" (Frank Turner song), 2010
- "I Still Believe" (Jeremy Camp song), 2003
- "I Still Believe" (Juliette Schoppmann song), 2004
- "I Still Believe" (Lee Greenwood song) 1988
- "I Still Believe" (Hayden Panettiere song), 2007, from the film Cinderella III: A Twist in Time
- "I Still Believe", by Ric Ocasek from Quick Change World
- "I Still Believe", from the musical Miss Saigon
- "I Still Believe (Great Design)", by the Call
  - "I Still Believe", a cover version by Tim Cappello from The Lost Boys: Original Motion Picture Soundtrack
