= Ride with Me (album) =

Studio album by Vanessa S.
- Released: August 25, 2003
- Recorded: 2003
- Genre: R&B
- Label: BMG

Vanessa S. chronology
Ride with Me (2003)	Independence (2004)

Ride with Me is the debut studio album by German recording artist Vanessa S. It was released by BMG on August 25, 2003, in German-speaking Europe, following her participation in the debut season of reality talent show Deutschland sucht den Superstar, where she had finished fourth. Incorporating elements of dance pop and contemporary R&B, Vanessa worked with several collaborators on the album, including Polish hip hop producer DJ Tomekk and his protégés Trooper Da Don and Said as well as rappers GERM and Ferris MC.

The album received lukewarm reviews from critics, with laut.de comparing its sound unfavorably to Jennifer Lopez's early albums while praising Vanessa's vocal performance. A moderate commercial success, Ride with Me debuted and peaked at number 30 on the German Albums Chart. Its release was preceded by the top five single "Ride Or Die (I Need You)" and followed by the top thirty entry "Fiesta" as well as the double-A single "Ey Ey Ey"/"Back to Life". However, lackluster sales of 30,000 copies resulted into the termination of her recording contract with BMG in 2004, making Ride with Me her only album with the label.

== Track listing ==
No.	Title	Writer(s)	Length
1.	"Fiesta" (featuring Ferris MC)	Roland Spremberg; Paule Klink; Sascha Reimann; Markus Brosch	3:17
2.	"I Ain't No Saint"	Nick Nice; Pontus Söderqvist; J. Sim	3:19
3.	"Ride With Me (I Know You)" (featuring GERM)	Luckz; K-L Dopson; Gottfridsson; GERM	3:47
4.	"Too Bad"	Ina Wolf; Martin Frainer; Petra Bonmassar	3:07
5.	"Back to Life"	Nellee Hooper; Simon Law; Caron Wheeler; Beresford Romeo	3:47
6.	"Ey Ey Ey" (featuring Said)	DJ Tomekk; Thomas Schmidt; Said Ahmed	2:56
7.	"Shining"	Stephan Browarczyk; Mirko von Schlieffen; Ivo Mohring; Christoph Brüx; Alex Prinz	3:51
8.	"Dirty Calypso"	Magnus McKenzie; Mats Ymell; Taylor Mittleman	2:47
9.	"Shine Through the Night" (featuring Trooper Da Don)	DJ Tomekk; Yasmin Kaldirem; Thomas Schmidt	4:04
10.	"Dance for Me"	Johan Ahlgren; Alex Brown	3:46
11.	"What I'm Gonna Do"	K-L Dopson; Fathead; Luchz	3:17
12.	"Girl Next Door" (featuring Trooper Da Don)	Phil Fuldner; M. Jaxon Bellina; Big'N'Nasteez; Leo Traunstein	3:35
13.	"One Single Tear"	Leif Larson; Cornelia Dahlgren; Johan Ramström	3:38
14.	"Ride Or Die (I Need You)" (Trooper Da Don featuring Vanessa S.)	Taylor; DJ Tomekk; Yasmin Kaldirem; Thomas Schmidt; Thomas Kuklicz	3:25

== Charts ==
Chart (2003)	Peak position
German Albums (Offizielle Top 100)	30

== Trivia ==
"Santa No Soy"

Song by RBD

from the album Rebelde
- Language: Spanish
- Released: 30 November 2004
- Recorded: 2004
- Genre: Latin pop; Pop rock
- Length: 3:08
- Label: EMI; Capitol; Televisa
- Songwriters: Nick Nice; Pontus Söderqvist (Note: Both billed as LaCarr); Judith Denise Sim; Michkin Boyzo
- Lyricist: Michkin Boyzo
- Producer: Armando Ávila

Music video
- Video on YouTube

In 2004, Mexican pop rock group RBD recorded a Spanish cover version of the track "I Ain't No Saint", titled "Santa No Soy", for their debut studio album Rebelde. It was released as part of the record as the ninth track, and features a pop rock sound, diverting from the original's R&B instrumentation. The song is performed mainly by members Anahí and Dulce María, with Maite Perroni provinding backing vocals during the verses and pre-chorus, and Christian Chávez singing during the chorus. It omits the first chorus before the first verse. The women performed the song during their first concert series, the Tour Generación RBD (2005-07), and two live performances are included in the DVDs Tour Generación RBD en Vivo (2005) and Live in Rio (recorded 2006, released 2007). During the shows, Perroni performed the first pre-chorus and post-second chorus interlude, with María doing a short ad-lib before Anahí sings the rest of them as the last two choruses are sung.
