= Nicole Süßmilch =

- Birth name: Nicole Süßmilch
- Born: May 2, 1980 (age 44)
- Origin: Munich, Bavaria, Germany
- Occupation: Singer

Nicole Süßmilch (born 2 May 1980) was a contestant on the first season of Deutschland sucht den Superstar. Nicole was not an original member of the top 10. She was brought back after Judith Lefeber withdrew from the competition. However, Nicole was eliminated on 8 January 2003, giving her 6th place in the competition.

Since the end of the show, Nicole has released 2 singles with Marco Matias who was her partner in the German Eurovision preselection back in 2005. Their song was "Miracle of Love" which was written by serial Eurovision songwriter Ralph Siegel under a pseudonym. The song finished a close second to "Run And Hide" performed by Gracia Baur, one of Nicole's fellow contestants in the first season of Deutschland sucht den Superstar.

== Idol Performances ==
- Top 30: Underneath Your Clothes (Shakira)
- Top 7: Don't Cry For Me Argentina (Evita)
- Top 6: Eternal Flame (The Bangles)
