= In Dreams =

In Dreams may refer to:

== Music ==
- "In Dreams", a single by Pete Bardens from the album "Seen One Earth", 1987
- In Dreams (Duster album), 2024
- In Dreams (Roy Orbison album), 1963
  - "In Dreams" (Roy Orbison song), 1963
- In Dreams: The Greatest Hits, a 1987 album by Orbison
- In Dreams (Joseph McManners album), 2005
- In Dreams (After the Burial album), 2010
- In Dreams (soundtrack), a 1999 soundtrack album
- "In Dreams" (Howard Shore song), a 2003 song from the Lord of the Rings film trilogy
- "In Dreams", a song by Vaughan Williams from his cycle Songs of Travel
- "Sapne Mein", a song by Vishal Bhardwaj, Sandeep Chowta, Suresh Wadkar and Asha Bhosle from the 1998 Indian film Satya
- In Dreams (musical), a 2023 jukebox musical using the songs of Roy Orbison

== Film and television ==
- In Dreams (film), a 1999 film directed by Neil Jordan
- In Dreams (1992 film), a British television film featuring Patsy Rowlands
- In Dreams: The Roy Orbison Story, a 1999 television special produced by Paul Cadieux
- "In Dreams" (Teenage Mutant Ninja Turtles), an episode of the third season of Teenage Mutant Ninja Turtles
- "In Dreams" (Fear the Walking Dead), an episode of the sixth season of Fear the Walking Dead

== Other uses ==
- In Dreams (book), a 1992 anthology of science fiction and horror stories
- "In Dreams", a 2000 Marvel Comics comic book story arc following Gambit

== See also ==
- In My Dreams (disambiguation)
- In Your Dreams (disambiguation)
