= In Your Dreams =

In Your Dreams may refer to:

== Music ==
- In Your Dreams (Leon Russell album), 2008
- In Your Dreams (Stevie Nicks album) or the title song, 2011
- In Your Dreams, a 2001 EP by Say Anything
- In Your Dreams, a 2006 musical written by Zeke Farrow, with music by Lucian Piane

== Television ==
- In Your Dreams (2013 TV series), an Australian children's drama series
- In Your Dreams (2023 TV series), a South African fantasy drama series
- "In Your Dreams" (Johnny Bravo), a 2000 episode of Johnny Bravo

== Other uses ==
- In Your Dreams (novel), a 2004 novel by Tom Holt
- In Your Dreams, a British film of 2008
- In Your Dreams, a Hong Kong film of 2018
- In Your Dreams (film), an American animated film

== See also ==
- In Dreams (disambiguation)
- In My Dreams (disambiguation)
