= Daniel – Der Zauberer =

- Theatrical release poster
- Directed by: Ulli Lommel
- Written by: Ulli Lommel
- Produced by: Peter Schamoni
- Starring: Daniel Küblböck; Uli Lommel
- Cinematography: Manuel Lommel
- Edited by: Angelika Steinbock
- Music by: Robert Schulze
- Production company: Peter Schamoni Film
- Distributed by: Stella / Rekord-Film
- Release date: 12 August 2004
- Running time: 81 minutes
- Country: Germany
- Language: German

Daniel – Der Zauberer (translated: Daniel – The Wizard) is a 2004 German biographical musical drama film written and directed by Ulli Lommel, starring pop singer Daniel Küblböck as himself.

The film was a box-office bomb and was panned by critics.

== Plot ==
Rock star Daniel Küblböck is "loved by millions, hated by many". Troubled teenagers Rike and Tom want fame, and are encouraged to kill Daniel by the mysterious Baltazar. Daniel begins receiving threatening hate mail from Rike and Tom. Daniel's family reports this to the police and encourage Daniel to hire bodyguards, but Daniel is not worried. Later, Daniel realizes that he is being protected with magic by the ghost of his dead grandfather, Johnny.

The first attempt on Daniel's life fails when the teenagers are scared away by Daniel's vocal coach. At a screen test for a Hollywood film, Daniel is pressured to be less authentic by the producers, and a fan encourages Daniel to be himself. Meanwhile, Johnny and Baltazar talk with each other about Daniel. As a warning, Johnny changes Baltazar into a cockroach. After Baltazar says the words "I’m a celebrity, get me out of here!", Johnny transforms him back into a human.

The dichotomy between those who love and hate Daniel is displayed by a young girl named Petra and her grandfather, Grandpa Winter. The two work at a café in Daniel's hometown of Eggenfelden. Grandpa Winter can't stand Daniel's music and neither can the café guests. Daniel arrives at the café and buys all of their cakes, signs Petra's book, and gives Petra and her grandfather two free tickets for his last concert of the year in Passau. Unbeknownst to Daniel, this is the show that Baltazar has told Rike and Tom to kill him at.

After Daniel goes backstage during the show, Rike kidnaps Daniel and brings him to their house. Tom and Rike plan to record their execution of Daniel in order to become celebrities. When Daniel is left alone, his grandfather appears to him and emboldens him, warning him that he is about to face his toughest trial to date. Rike and Tom return and are unable to make themselves go through with the plan to kill Daniel. Tom confides in Daniel that his abusive step-father stole his prized guitar after telling him that he could never play music. Daniel tells Tom that he could become a musician if he tried. Realizing that they are not so different from each other, Tom releases him after Daniel says that he won't report the kidnapping.

Daniel returns to perform at his concert. The crowd is excited, including Petra's grandfather, who has now become a fan of Daniel's. Later, Daniel asks Johnny whether he will receive a Christmas gift after overcoming his ordeal. However, Johnny says to him that he forgot to give Rike and Tom anything for Christmas, and that he should give Tom something special: his new guitar. Daniel is skeptical of the idea of giving his guitar to the people who tried to kill him. However, after he goes through with it, Rike and Tom are delighted, and the three, now friends, play with it in the snowy garden to the song "I Like The Skin I'm In".

Johnny and Baltazar meet again. Baltazar says to him that while Johnny has won this fight, the struggle between them isn't over yet. Johnny reveals to Baltazar that he has passed his magic wand on to Daniel, and the two debate whether Daniel will be able to handle his newly gained magical powers. Returning home, Daniel finds the wand under the Christmas tree, with a note saying: "From the one-armed man". Daniel's grandma recognizes this as being from her deceased husband, and tells Daniel how she met Johnny at Oktoberfest, where he was working as a musician. Daniel's grandma tells him that he must only use the wand to help people.

Daniel falls asleep clutching the wand, dreaming of the premiere of his film and performing in concert. But the dream turns into a nightmare, and Daniel imagines Baltazar stabbing him in his bed. Waking with a start, he again sees his grandfather, who tells him he has no need to be afraid. Daniel gets up, goes to the church of Saint Nicholas and Stephen, prays, and lights a candle. The film closes with concert footage of Daniel dancing to the song "My Life Is Magic".

== Cast ==
- Daniel Küblböck as himself
- Ulli Lommel as Johannes "Johnny" Küblböck (Daniel's grandpa)
- Peter Schamoni as Grandpa Winter
- Rudolf Waldemar Brem as Baltazar
- Günther Küblböck as himself (Daniel's father)
- Marina Lommel as Petra
- Manolito Lommel as Daniel at age six
- Katja Rupé as Grandma Küblböck
- Adele Eden as Rike
- Oliver Möller as Tom
- Roger Fritz as film producer from Hollywood
- Günther Ziegler as vocal coach

== Production ==
=== Style ===
Director Ulli Lommel stated that he wanted to make a film that shows young people how to deal with frustration and hate without getting into the eternal cycle of hate and counter hate. In his opinion, the understanding between the old and the young people and the mutual trust plays an important role in it and so he decided to shoot the film with an intergenerational cast. The cast features experienced actors like Lommel, Schamoni, Brem, and Rupé; young actors like Eden and Möller; and also lay actors like Küblböck. All scenes were filmed spontaneously.

The film includes many references to Küblböck's real life: For example, when Daniel has a nightmare in the film, a scene from his appearance in the reality TV show Ich bin ein Star – Holt mich hier raus! is displayed, in which he had to lie in a coffin full of cockroaches. Headlines about Daniel Küblböck in the tabloid newspaper Bild are also shown (one refers to Küblböck's car accident with a truck).

Ulli Lommel tried to find an explanation for the controversy about Daniel Küblböck in Germany:

I know that from my childhood: In Germany we were taught this way: You must not do certain things. You have to behave yourself. And now there is Daniel and he isn't willing to take those fixed bourgeois roles. He creates his own role. He breaks taboos, makes himself up, dresses like a girl. He cries, is clownish, is hysterical. For short: He doesn't behave himself. And because he does this in public, I think some consider this as a salvation and love him and others can't bear this and hate him.

— Ulli Lommel on Daniel Küblböck

== Soundtrack ==
The film contains four songs by Daniel Küblböck:

- "Teenage Tears" (peaked at #16 on the German singles chart)
- "My Life Is Magic"
- "Man in the Moon"
- "The Skin I'm In"

== Release ==
Daniel – Der Zauberer was released in Germany on 12 August 2004, and was watched by 13,834 viewers in total. Most cinemas removed the film from their programme after the first week, because of the low number of attendees. On 30 September 2005 the film was released on DVD (available in Germany and Austria only).

== Reception ==
The film was universally panned by critics. The website filmstarts.de states that Daniel - Der Zauberer was "unbearable for non-fans of Küblböck", "the performances of the actors were some of the worst in the history of German cinema" and that Ulli Lommel and producer Peter Schamoni "damaged their reputation." Another critic from the website filmzentrale.de described Daniel Küblböck as a hero of the recent German trash culture. He wrote that the film is staged like an Off-Off-Broadway play. Everything in this film had the touch of the half-finished, temporary and uncertain and therefore it would be loveable. Küblböck would cultivate the lowbrow through to the camp, he'd present the beautiful sentimentality and the great kitsch.

The film also performed extremely poorly at the box office, drawing only 13,834 viewers altogether, which led to it being withdrawn from screening at cinemas within the first week.

As of 2022, Daniel the Wizard had a rating of 1.2 out of 10 on IMDb. It was the lowest rated movie on IMDb for a long time, and wieistderfilm.de stated it was fair to call it the worst German film ever made. It appeared on Total Film's list of the 66 worst films of all time. In an interview conducted several years after its release Daniel Küblböck admitted that in retrospect "You have to say this is the worst movie of all time really." However, he took the film's failure with humor and in later years even joked about it. In a 2013 talk show, he said that it was voted the worst film of all time and ironically said "Not everyone achieves that."

== See also ==
- List of 21st century films considered the worst
