= Juliette Schoppmann =

Musical artist (born 1980)

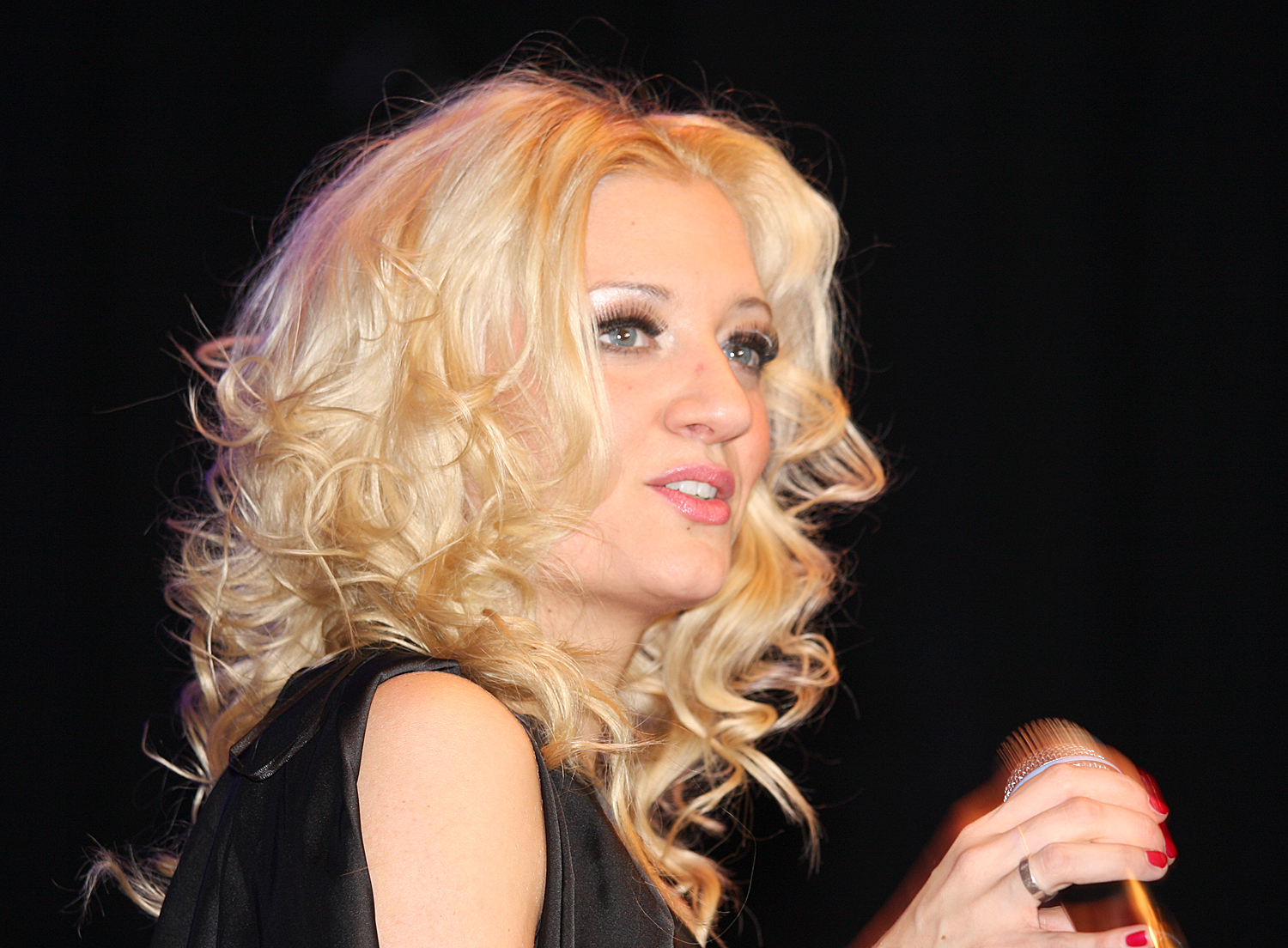
- Schoppmann in 2008

Background information
- Born: 18 March 1980 (age 46)
- Origin: Stade, Germany
- Genres: Pop
- Occupation: Singer
- Years active: 2003–present
- Label: Sony BMG
- Website: juliette-schoppmann.com

Juliette Schoppmann (born 18 March 1980) is a German singer, songwriter and vocal coach who came to fame as the runner-up of the debut season of the television series Deutschland sucht den Superstar, the German Idol series adaptation.

Born and raised in Stade, Schoppmann was a trained musical artist before she participated in the show for which she recorded the number-one hit "We Have a Dream" and the album United along with all other finalists. After DSDS, she signed with BMG and released her moderately successful debut album Unique (2004) which spawned the top ten hits "Calling You" and "I Still Believe".

Following the termination of her contract, Schoppmann returned to musical theatre and worked as a songwriter and vocal coach. In 2012, she participated in the sixth season of Das Supertalent, the German version of Got Talent franchise, where she finished sixth in the final. In 2014, Schoppmann recorded and released "To the Sky", the official anthem for the 2013–2014 season of the Four Hills Tournament. The same year, she was consulted as a coach on Das Supertalent. In 2018, Schoppmann also became a vocal coach on the 15th season of Deutschland sucht den Superstar.

== Discography ==
=== Studio albums ===
List of albums, with selected chart positions and certifications
Title	Album details	Peak chart positions		
Title	Album details	GER	AUT	SWI
Unique	Released: 9 February 2004; Label: Sony Music; Formats: CD, digital download	15	—	74

=== Singles ===
List of singles, with selected chart positions
Title	Year	Peak chart positions			Album
Title	Year	GER	AUT	SWI	Album
"Calling You"	2003	10	56	23	Unique
"Only Uh, Uh,..."	2003	60	—	72	Unique
"I Still Believe"	2004	9	—	100	Unique
"This Special Night"	2011	—	—	—	non-album release
"To the Sky"	2013	—	—	—	non-album release
