= Only Uh, Uh,... =

Single by Juliette Schoppmann

from the album Unique
- Released: 13 October 2003
- Length: 3:57
- Label: BMG
- Songwriters: Steve Lee; Pete Martin; Tina Harris
- Producer: Pete Martin

Juliette Schoppmann singles chronology
"Calling You" (2003)	"Only Uh, Uh,..." (2003)	"I Still Believe" (2004)

"Only Uh, Uh,..." is a song by German recording artist Juliette Schoppmann. It was written by Steve Lee, Pete "Boxta" Martin, and Tina Harris and recorded by Schoppmann for her debut studio album, Unique (2004). Production was helmed by Martin. Released in October 2003 as the album's second single, the uptempo electro pop song underperformed on the charts, peaking at number 60 on the German Singles Chart, becoming Unique's lowest-charting single.

== Critical reception ==
Vicky Butscher from laut.de praised Schoppmann's versatility as well as her vocal performance on the track. She found that "Only Uh, Uh,..." was "clearly carrying the touch" of Sugababes producer Pete "Boxta" Martin." Butscher also noted that the song "even somewhat resembles Madonna's electronic tracks."

== Chart performance ==
Released by BMG on 13 October 2003 as Schoppmann's second single, "Only Uh, Uh,..." debuted and peaked at number 60 on the German Singles Chart. It would spend two weeks inside the top 100, becoming Unique's lowest-running single as well as its only single not to reach the top ten. "Only Uh, Uh,..." also entered the Swiss Singles Chart, reaching number 72.

== Track listing ==
All tracks produced by Pete "Boxta" Martin.

CD single
No.	Title	Length
1.	"Only Uh, Uh,..." (single mix)	3:16
2.	"Only Uh, Uh,..." (extended mix)	3:57
3.	"Only Uh, Uh,..." (instrumental)	3:16

== Credits and personnel ==
Credits lifted from the liner notes of Unique.

- Tina Harris – writer
- Steve Lee – writer
- Pete "Boxta" Martin – producer, writer
- Juliette Schoppmann – vocals

== Charts ==
Weekly chart performance for "Only Uh, Uh,..."
Chart (2003)	Peak position
Germany (GfK)	60
Switzerland (Schweizer Hitparade)	72
