= In My Dreams (Judith Lefeber album) =

Studio album by Judith Lefeber
- Released: October 29, 2003
- Length: 48:48
- Label: Warner
- Producer: Johan Aberg; Till Brönner; Jens Kuphal; Gregor Prächt; Florian Richter; Schumann & Bach

Judith Lefeber chronology
| In My Dreams (2003) | In My Room (2004) |

In My Dreams is the debut studio album by German singer Judith Lefeber. It was released by Warner Music on October 29, 2003. Chiefly produced by Jens Kuphal, the album reached number 17 on the German Albums Chart and produced the top 20 single "I Will Follow You."

== Background ==
In 2002, Lefeber participated in the debut season of Deutschland sucht den SuperStar, the German spin-off from the British show Pop Idol. Although she was widely considered as the favourite finalist right from the beginning of the show, she decided to leave DSDS after her second performance, explaining that personal issues that had arisen. However, after the final show it was revealed that Lefeber had received the highest percent of votes both during the top 10 and top 9 shows. Afterwards Lefeber signed a contract with Warner Music and began work on her debut album.

== Critical reception ==
The album produced two singles. The lead single, "I Will Follow You," written by Achim Oppermann and Lars Jacobsen, became the more successful of the two releases, peaking at number 13 on the German Singles Chart and number 61 in Switzerland. It was followed by "Everybody Does," penned by Kathy Sommer and Sally Ries, which reached number 70 in Germany.

== Commercial performance ==
In My Dreams debuted and peaked at number 17 on the German Albums Chart in the week of 3 November 2003. It remained on the chart for a total of five weeks before dropping out of the top 100. The album would remain Lefeber's only album with Warner Records.

== Track listing ==
In My Dreams track listing
| No. | Title | Writer(s) | Producer(s) | Length |
|---|---|---|---|---|
| 1. | "Everybody Does" | Kathy Sommer; Sally Ries | Florian Richter | 3:43 |
| 2. | "Someone like You" | Götz von Sydow | Richter | 3:47 |
| 3. | "I Will Follow You" | Achim Oppermann; Lars Jacobsen | Richter | 4:19 |
| 4. | "Just Give Me Your Word" | Till Brönner; Robert Hoare | Brönner; Jens Kuphal | 3:35 |
| 5. | "Falling" | Diana Williamson; Narada Michael Walden; Richter | Richter | 3:21 |
| 6. | "Only in My Dreams" | Johan Aberg; Paul Rein | Aberg | 2:59 |
| 7. | "Touch You" | Frank Highland; Aaron Sain; Gregor Prächt | Kuphal; Prächt; Schumann & Bach | 3:18 |
| 8. | "Is It Love" | Frank Kretschmer; Tom Remm | Kuphal | 3:18 |
| 9. | "Man of My Dreams" | Ellen Shipley; Eric Kaz | Kuphal; Prächt; Schumann & Bach | 4:49 |
| 10. | "In a Love Song" | Brönner; Hoare | Brönner; Kuphal | 4:29 |
| 11. | "Saving All My Love for You" | Gerry Goffin; Michael Masser | Brönner; Kuphal | 4:01 |
| 12. | "The Way You Look at Me" | Keith Follesé; Andrew Fromm | Kuphal; Schumann & Bach | 3:25 |
| 13. | "The Windmills of Your Mind" | Michel Legrand; Alan Bergman; Marilyn Bergman | Brönner; Kuphal | 3:46 |
| Total length: | | | | 48:48 |

== Charts ==
Weekly chart performance for In My Dreams
| Chart (2003) | Peak position |
|---|---|
| German Albums (Offizielle Top 100) | 17 |

== Release history ==
In My Dreams release history
| Region | Date | Format | Label |
|---|---|---|---|
| Various | October 29, 2003 | CD; digital download | Warner |
