= Deutschland sucht den Superstar season 1 =

Deutschland sucht den Superstar
- Season 1
- Hosted by: Michelle Hunziker & Carsten Spengemann
- Judges: Dieter Bohlen; Thomas Bug; Shona Fraser; Thomas Stein
- Winner: Alexander Klaws
- Runner-up: Juliette Schoppmann

Release
- Original network: RTL
- Original release: 24 November 2002 – 8 March 2003

Season chronology
- Next → Season 2

The first season of Deutschland sucht den Superstar premiered on 24 November 2002 and continued until 8 March 2003. It was won by Alexander Klaws. The season was co-hosted by Michelle Hunziker and Carsten Spengemann.

== Finals ==
=== Finalists ===
Finalist	Age *	From	Status
Stephanie Brauckmeyer	22	Berlin	Eliminated 1st in Week 1
Andrea Josten	17	Ginsheim-Gustavsburg	Eliminated 2nd in Week 2
Judith Lefeber	21	Rheda-Wiedenbrück	Withdrew in Week 3
Nektarios Bamiatzis	27	Fellbach	Eliminated 3rd in Week 3
Daniel Lopes	26	Schloß Holte-Stukenbrock	Eliminated 4th in Week 4
Nicole Süßmilch	22	Berlin	Eliminated 5th in Week 5
Gracia Baur	20	Munich	Eliminated 6th in Week 6
Vanessa Struhler	17	Oberhausen	Eliminated 7th in Week 7
Daniel Küblböck	17	Eggenfelden	Eliminated 8th in Week 8
Juliette Schoppmann	22	Hamburg	Runner-up
Alexander Klaws	19	Sendenhorst	Winner

* as of the start of the season

=== Live show details ===
==== Heat 1 (30 November 2002) ====
Order	Artist	Song (original artists)	Result
1	Claudio	"(Everything I Do) I Do It for You" (Bryan Adams)	Eliminated
2	Jana Wall	"Don't Speak" (No Doubt)	Eliminated
3	Katrin	"Like a Prayer" (Madonna)	Eliminated
4	Judith Lefeber	"Un-Break My Heart" (Toni Braxton)	Advanced
5	Sevacettin Yanmaz	"One in a Million" (Bosson)	Eliminated
6	Patrizia	"How Do I Live" (LeAnn Rimes)	Eliminated
7	Patrick	"Daydream Believer" (The Monkees)	Eliminated
8	Daniel Küblböck	"Papa Don't Preach" (Madonna)	Advanced
9	Vanessa Struhler	"Fallin'" (Alicia Keys)	Eliminated
10	Alexander Klaws	"Angels" (Robbie Williams)	Advanced

Notes

- Alexander Klaws, Judith Lefeber and Daniel Küblböck advanced to the top 10 of the competition. The other seven contestants were eliminated.
- Vanessa Struhler returned for a second chance at the top 10 in the "Wildcard Round" and won and completed the top 10.

==== Heat 2 (7 December 2002) ====
Order	Artist	Song (original artists)	Result
1	Juliette Schoppmann	"Saving All My Love for You" (Whitney Houston)	Advanced
2	Robert	"Every Breath You Take" (The Police)	Eliminated
3	Ida	"I Will Survive" (Gloria Gaynor)	Eliminated
4	Gracia Baur	"Stop!" (Sam Brown)	Advanced
5	Sebastian	"The Lady in Red" (Chris de Burgh)	Eliminated
6	Alina Wichmann	"Your Song" (Elton John)	Eliminated
7	Nicole Süßmilch	"Underneath Your Clothes" (Shakira)	Eliminated
8	Aret Saroyan	"Against All Odds (Take a Look at Me Now)" (Phil Collins)	Eliminated
9	Sascha	"World of Our Own" (Westlife)	Eliminated
10	Nektarios Bamiatzis	"Flying Without Wings" (Westlife)	Advanced

Notes

- Juliette Schoppmann, Gracia Baur and Nektarios Bamiatzis advanced to the top 10 of the competition. The other seven contestants were eliminated.
- Nicole Süßmilch returned for a second chance at the top 10 in the "Wildcard Round" and lost.

==== Heat 3 (14 December 2002) ====
Order	Artist	Song (original artists)	Result
1	Kathrin	"Ordinary Day" (Vanessa Carlton)	Eliminated
2	Michael	"All or Nothing" (O-Town)	Eliminated
3	Andrea Josten	"I Will Always Love You" (Whitney Houston)	Advanced
4	Tarik Sarzep	"End of the Road" (Boyz II Men)	Eliminated
5	Sharon	"My Love Is Your Love" (Whitney Houston)	Eliminated
6	Daniel Schnitzler	"Faith" (George Michael)	Eliminated
7	Nilufar	"Stand by Me" (Ben E. King)	Eliminated
8	Daniel Lopes	"Angel" (Jon Secada)	Advanced
9	Peter Goeke	"When You Say Nothing at All" (Ronan Keating)	Eliminated
10	Stephanie Brauckmeyer	"A Woman's Worth" (Alicia Keys)	Advanced

Notes

- Daniel Lopes, Andrea Josten and Stephanie Brauckmeyer advanced to the top 10 of the competition. The other seven contestants were eliminated.
- Tarik Sarzep returned for a second chance at the top 10 in the "Wildcard Round" and lost.

==== Live show 1 (21 December 2002) ====
Theme: My Superstar

Order	Artist	Song (original artists)	Result
1	Juliette Schoppmann	"I Wanna Dance with Somebody (Who Loves Me)" (Whitney Houston)	Safe
2	Nektarios Bamiatzis	"To Be with You" (Mr. Big)	Safe
3	Vanessa Struhler	"When You Look at Me" (Christina Milian)	Safe
4	Gracia Baur	"She Works Hard for the Money" (Donna Summer)	Bottom two
5	Daniel Lopes	"Livin' la Vida Loca" (Ricky Martin)	Safe
6	Judith Lefeber	"One Moment in Time" (Whitney Houston)	Safe
7	Alexander Klaws	"Every Breath You Take" (The Police)	Safe
8	Stephanie Brauckmeyer	"I Say a Little Prayer" (Aretha Franklin)	Eliminated
9	Andrea Josten	"I'm Outta Love" (Anastacia)	Bottom three
10	Daniel Küblböck	"Another Day in Paradise" (Phil Collins)	Safe

==== Live show 2 (28 December 2002) ====
Theme: Love songs

Order	Artist	Song (original artists)	Result
1	Daniel Lopes	"Careless Whisper" (George Michael)	Bottom two
2	Andrea Josten	"I Still Believe" (Mariah Carey)	Eliminated
3	Nektarios Bamiatzis	"Kiss from a Rose" (Seal)	Bottom three
4	Gracia Baur	"There You'll Be" (Faith Hill)	Safe
5	Juliette Schoppmann	"Without You" (Mariah Carey)	Safe
6	Alexander Klaws	"Hello" (Lionel Richie)	Safe
7	Vanessa Struhler	"Save the Best for Last" (Vanessa Williams)	Safe
8	Daniel Küblböck	"Unchained Melody" (The Righteous Brothers)	Safe
9	Judith Lefeber	"Think Twice" (Celine Dion)	Safe

==== Live show 3 (4 January 2003) ====
Theme: Hits of 2002

Order	Artist	Song (original artists)	Result
N/A	Judith Lefeber	N/A	Withdrew
1	Vanessa Struhler	"I'm Gonna Be Alright" (Jennifer Lopez)	Bottom three
2	Alexander Klaws	"If Tomorrow Never Comes" (Ronan Keating)	Safe
3	Gracia Baur	"What If" (Kate Winslet)	Bottom two
4	Nektarios Bamiatzis	"Bevor du gehst" (Xavier Naidoo)	Eliminated
5	Daniel Lopes	"Hero" (Enrique Iglesias)	Safe
6	Daniel Küblböck	"Everytime" (The Flames)	Safe
7	Juliette Schoppmann	"From Sarah with Love" (Sarah Connor)	Safe

==== Live show 4 (11 January 2003) ====
Theme: Musicals

Order	Artist	Song (original artists)	Result
1	Nicole Süßmilch	"Don't Cry for Me Argentina" (Evita)	Safe
2	Daniel Lopes	"A Whole New World" (Aladdin)	Eliminated
3	Juliette Schoppmann	"Out Here on My Own" (Fame)	Bottom two
4	Vanessa Struhler	"Lady Marmalade" (Moulin Rouge!)	Bottom three
5	Alexander Klaws	"Starlight Express" (Starlight Express)	Safe
6	Daniel Küblböck	"Tragedy" (Saturday Night Fever)	Safe
7	Gracia Baur	"Memory" (Cats)	Safe

==== Live show 5 (18 January 2003) ====
Theme: The 80s

Order	Artist	Song (original artists)	Result
1	Gracia Baur	"Black Velvet" (Alannah Myles)	Safe
2	Vanessa Struhler	"Get Here" (Oleta Adams)	Bottom two
3	Nicole Süßmich	"Eternal Flame" (The Bangles)	Eliminated
4	Alexander Klaws	"Right Here Waiting" (Richard Marx)	Safe
5	Juliette Schoppmann	"The Power of Love" (Jennifer Rush)	Bottom three
6	Daniel Küblböck	"99 Luftballons" (Nena)	Safe

==== Live show 6 (1 February 2003) ====
Theme: Big Band

Order	Artist	Song (original artists)	Result
1	Juliette Schoppmann	"Big Spender" (Shirley Bassey)	Bottom three
2	Vanessa Struhler	"Get Happy" (Judy Garland)	Bottom two
3	Daniel Küblböck	"My Way" (Frank Sinatra)	Safe
4	Gracia Baur	"The Lady Is a Tramp" (Ella Fitzgerald)	Eliminated
5	Alexander Klaws	"Mack the Knife" (Bobby Darin)	Safe

==== Live show 7 (8 February 2003) ====
Theme: The 70s & Disco

Order	Artist	First song (original artists)	Second song	Result
1	Daniel Küblböck	"Dancing Queen" (ABBA)	"Night Fever" (Bee Gees)	Bottom two
2	Vanessa Struhler	"Sunny" (Boney M.)	"I Love to Love (But My Baby Loves to Dance)" (Tina Charles)	Eliminated
3	Alexander Klaws	"Maniac" (Michael Sembello)	"Relight My Fire" (Dan Hartman)	Safe
4	Juliette Schoppmann	"Flashdance... What a Feeling" (Irene Cara)	"It's Raining Men" (The Weather Girls)	Safe

==== Live show 8: semi-final (1 March 2003) ====
Theme: Movies

Order	Artist	First song (original artists)	Second song	Result
1	Alexander Klaws	"I Believe I Can Fly" (R. Kelly)	"You Can Leave Your Hat On" (Joe Cocker)	Safe
2	Juliette Schoppmann	"My Heart Will Go On" (Celine Dion)	"Licence to Kill" (Gladys Knight)	Safe
3	Daniel Küblböck	"Oh, Pretty Woman" (Roy Orbison)	"Born to Be Wild" (Steppenwolf)	Eliminated

==== Live final (8 March 2003) ====
Order	Artist	First song (original artists)	Second song	Third song	Result
1	Juliette Schoppmann	"Through the Rain"	"It's Raining Men"	"Take Me Tonight"	Runner-up
2	Alexander Klaws	"She's the One"	"Maniac"	"Take Me Tonight"	Winner

== Releases ==
DSDS finalists

- Albums: United (2002)
- Singles: "We Have a Dream", "Tonight" (Promotional)

Alexander Klaws

- Albums: Take Your Chance (2003), Here I Am (2004), Attention! (2006) Was Willst Du Noch? (2008)
- Singles: "Take Me Tonight", "Stay with Me", "Free like the Wind", "Behind the Sun", "Sunshine After the Rain", "Here I Am", "All (I Ever Want)", "Not like You", "Welt"

Juliette Schoppmann

- Albums: Unique (2003)
- Singles: "Calling You", "It's Only Uh Uh", "I Still Believe"

Daniel Küblböck

- Albums: Positive Energie (2003), Liebe Nation (2005)
- Singles: "You Drive Me Crazy", "Heartbeat", "The Lion Sleeps Tonight", "Teenage Tears", "König von Deutschland"

Vanessa Struhler

- Albums: Ride with Me (2003), Independence (2004)
- Singles: "Ride or Die (I Need You)", "Fiesta", "Ey Ey Ey/Back to Life", "One Single Tear", "Blah Blah Blah", "Don't Say (You're Sorry)", "Bonafide", "Take Me Slow", "When U Luv"

Gracia Baur

- Albums: Intoxicated (2003), Passion (2005)
- Singles: "I Don't Think So", "I Believe in Miracles", "Run & Hide", "When the Last Tear's Been Dried", "Never Been"

Nicole Süßmilch

- Singles: "A Miracle of Love" (with Marco Matias)

Daniel Lopes

- Albums: For You (2003)
- Singles: "Shine on", "I Love You More Than Yesterday", "Last Christmas/I Used To Cry", "Change the World"

Nektarios Bamiatzis

- Singles: "Looks like We Made It"

Judith Lefeber

- Alben: In My Dreams (2003), In My Room (2004)
- Singles: "I Will Follow You", "Everybody Does", "In My Room"

4 United (Daniel Küblböck, Gracia Baur, Nektarios Bamiatzis, Stephanie Brauckmeyer)

- Singles: "Don't Close Your Eyes"

== Elimination chart ==
Legend
Did not perform	Female	Male	Top 30	Top 10	Winner

Safe	Safe First	Safe Last	Eliminated	Wild Card	Did not perform	Most votes

Stage:		Semi			Wild; Card	Finals								
Week:		11/30	12/7	12/14	Wild; Card	12/21	12/28	1/4	1/11	1/18	2/1	2/8	3/1	3/8
Place	Contestant	Result												
1	Alexander Klaws	1st				4th 8,1%	5th 6,2%	3rd 17,6%	4th 15,2%	2nd 21,2%	2nd 24,9%	1st 36,9%	1st 40,5%	Winner; 70,1%
2	Juliette Schoppmann		1st			3rd 9,8%	4th 7,4%	2nd 18,3%	6th 7,0%	4th 13,5%	3rd 15,0%	2nd 28,1%	2nd 32,0%	Runner-Up; 29,9%
3	Daniel Küblböck	3rd				2nd 24,7%	2nd 28,2%	1st 27,4%	2nd 21,1%	1st 38,5%	1st 35,8%	3rd 24,4%	3rd 27,5%	
4	Vanessa Struhler	4th			Adv	5th 6,1%	3rd 7,8%	5th 9,3%	5th 9,2%	5th 7,2%	4th 12,3%	4th 10,6%		
5	Gracia Baur		2nd			9th 1,9%	6th 5,5%	6th 8,5%	1st 25,2%	3rd 13,5%	5th 12,0%			
6	Nicole Süßmilch		4th		Elim				3rd 16,0%	6th 6,0%				
7	Daniel Lopes			1st		6th 4,4%	8th 4,2%	4th 12,1%	7th 6,4%					
8	Nektarios Bamiatzis		3rd			7th 2,1%	7th 5,2%	7th 6,7%						
Quit	Judith Lefeber	2nd				1st 39,4%	1st 33,4%	Wdrw						
9	Andrea Josten			2nd		8th 2,0%	9th 2,2%							
10	Stephanie Brauckmeyer			3rd		10th 1,5%								
Semi- Final 3	Tarik Sarzep			4th	Elim									
Semi- Final 3	Daniel Schnitzler			Elim										
Semi- Final 3	Kathrin			Elim										
Semi- Final 3	Michael			Elim										
Semi- Final 3	Nilufar			Elim										
Semi- Final 3	Peter Goeke			Elim										
Semi- Final 3	Sharon			Elim										
Semi- Final 2	Alina Wichmann		Elim											
Semi- Final 2	Aret Saroyan		Elim											
Semi- Final 2	Ida		Elim											
Semi- Final 2	Robert		Elim											
Semi- Final 2	Sascha		Elim											
Semi- Final 2	Sebastian		Elim											
Semi- Final 1	Claudio	Elim												
Semi- Final 1	Jana Wall	Elim												
Semi- Final 1	Katrin	Elim												
Semi- Final 1	Patrizia	Elim												
Semi- Final 1	Patrick	Elim												
Semi- Final 1	Sevacettin Yanmaz	Elim												

- Because of Judith's withdrawal, Nicole, who just missed out to get into the top 10, replaced her.

Preceded by None	Deutschland sucht den Superstar; Season 1 (2002/03)	Succeeded by Season 2 (2003/04)
