= I Still Believe (Juliette Schoppmann song) =

Single by Juliette Schoppmann

from the album Unique
- Released: 12 January 2004
- Length: 4:35
- Label: BMG
- Songwriters: Peer Åström; Jörgen Elofsson; John Reid
- Producer: Peter Ries

Juliette Schoppmann singles chronology
"Only Uh, Uh,..." (2003)	"I Still Believe" (2004)	"This Special Night" (2011)

"I Still Believe" is a song by German recording artist Juliette Schoppmann. It was written by Jörgen Elofsson, John Reid, and Per Åström and recorded by Schoppmann for her debut studio album, Unique (2004). Production was overseen by Peter Ries. Released in January 2004 as the album's third and final single, the ballad became Unique's highest-charting single when it peaked at number nine on the German Singles Chart. As of 2018, it remain's Schoppmann's biggest hit.

== Chart performance ==
Released by BMG as the Schoppmann's third single on 12 January 2004, "I Still Believe" debuted and peaked at nine on the German Singles Chart in the week of 26 January 2004, becoming the singer's second solo top ten hit after "Calling You" (2003). It would remain nine weeks inside the top 100. "I Still Believe" also entered the Swiss Singles Chart, reaching number 100.

== Music video ==
A music video for "I Still Believe" was directed by Robert Bröllochs and produced by Camelot Film. It was filmed in various locations throughout Sankt Peter-Ording, located in the district of Nordfriesland, including the lighthouse in Böhl. Bröllochs, along with Michael Proehl, served as producers on the visals, while cinematography was helmed by Jason West.

== Track listings ==
All tracks produced by Peter Ries.

CD single
No.	Title	Length
1.	"I Still Believe" (radio edit)	3:43
2.	"I Still Believe" (album edit)	4:30
3.	"I Still Believe" (instrumental)	3:43

== Credits and personnel ==
Credits lifted from the liner notes of Unique.

- Peer Åström – writer
- Jörgen Elofsson – writer
- Manfred Honetschläger – arranger
- Björn Krumbügel – programming
- Dirk Kurock – recording engineer
- Tadeusz Mieczkowski – recording engineer
- John Reid – writer
- Peter Ries – producer
- Ossi Schaller – guitar
- Juliette Schoppmann – vocals
- Peter Siedlaczek – recording supervisor
- S.L.O.W., Symphonic Lab. Orchestra Warsaw – orchestra
- Shaj Ya – background vocals
- Ulf Zwerger – engineering assistance

== Charts ==
Weekly chart performance for "I Still Believe"
Chart (2004)	Peak position
Germany (GfK)	9
Switzerland (Schweizer Hitparade)	100
