= Ferris MC =

German rapper

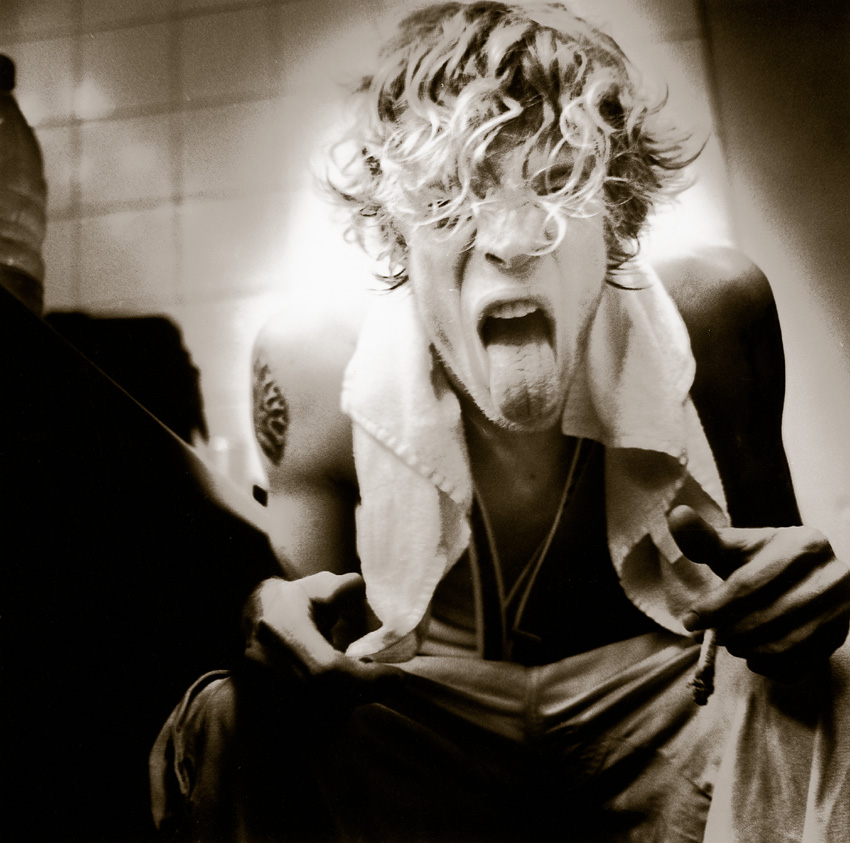

Background information
- Born: Sascha Reimann; 2 October 1973 (age 52)
- Origin: Kiel, Germany
- Genres: German hip hop, rap rock, punk rock
- Occupations: Rapper; actor; musician; disc jockey
- Years active: 1994–present
- Labels: MZEE, Yo Mama, Missglückte Welt
- Website: www.ferrismc.de

Sascha Reimann (born 2 October 1973 in Neuwied), better known by his stage name Ferris MC, is a German musician, rapper and actor.

== Biography ==
Ferris spent his youth in Neumünster, Kiel, and then Bremen. A recurring theme of social exclusion is predominant in his music.

He graduated from Hauptschule and served his apprenticeship as an auto mechanic. At the same time, he was a radio DJ and actor (e.g. Tatort).

Together with Flowin Immo and DJ Pee, Ferris founded the Freaks Association Bremen (FAB), which, in the quickly-growing German hip hop scene, achieved success rather quickly. They performed at several events, festivals, and on MTV and VIVA.

In 1994, FAB released their first album Freaks, on the small indie label MZEE. Three years later, they disbanded over a private, professional dispute.

Ferris moved to Hamburg and in with Tobi Tobsen and finds DJ Stylewarz, who turned out to be a patient live DJ that was more fitting to Ferris' musical style. He released several records on Yo Mama.

In 1999, he released the single "Reimemonster" with fellow rapper Afrob, which was a success, and followed it with his first solo album Asimetrie. Im August 2000 he parted ways with DJ Stylewarz, and wound up deeper in the Hamburg drug scene.

His second LP Fertich was released in 2001, but the single "Flash for Ferris MC" and the corresponding music video don't fulfill the high commercial expectations. In 2003, Ferris released a musical autobiography, adequately called Audiobiographie and his last regular album Ferris MC.

On 17 March 2006, his last single was released on the greatest hits album Düstere Legende'. It concluded Ferris' career as a hip hop artist.

As Maniax, a house and electro project with Marc Deal, he played in clubs in Germany, Austria, and Switzerland until 2008.

From 2008 to 2018, he was a member of the band Deichkind.

== Discography ==
=== Albums ===
- 1995 – Freaks (as FAB; MZEE)
- 1999 – Asimetrie (Yo Mama)
- 2001 – Fertich! (Yo Mama)
- 2003 – Audiobiographie (Yo Mama)
- 2004 – Ferris MC (Yo Mama)
- 2006 – Düstere Legenden
- 2015 – Glück ohne Scherben
- 2017 – Asilant
- 2019 – Wahrscheinlich nie wieder vielleicht
- 2020 – Missglückte Asimetrie
- 2022 – Alle hassen Ferris
- 2024 – Mortal Comeback

=== Singles ===
- 1995 – Freaks (as FAB; 12", MZEE)
- 1997 – Es tut mir leid (as FAB; 12")
- 1997 – ERiCH Privat (FAB; EP)
- 1999 – Im Zeichen des Freaks
- 2000 – Tanz mit mir
- 2001 – Flash for Ferris MC
- 2002 – Viel zu spät
- 2003 – Zur Erinnerung
- 2003 – Fiesta (feat. Vanessa S.)
- 2004 – Feierarlarm
- 2004 – Was wäre wenn?
- 2004 – Spieglein, Spieglein
- 2004 – Rappen und Feiern (with JaOne & Twizzy)
- 2005 – Wixtape Vol.1 >> Der übliche Verdächtige
- 2005 – Die Nacht der Freaks (feat. Mellow Trax)
- 2005 – Achtung! Achtung! (as Maniax; 12")
- 2006 – Düstere Legende (Achtung! Achtung!) (also as DVD)
- 2007 – Fuck the World (from Tube & Berger feat. Electro Ferris, 12″)
- 2008 – Arbeit nervt (as member from Deichkind)
- 2008 – Day Off (as Electro Ferris, 12″)
- 2008 – 2 MC`S & 1 DJ (from DJ Stylewarz, Ferris MC and Toni-L, 12″)
- 2008 – Dark City/Sex in the City (Maniax, 12″)
- 2008 – Plutonium Boy (Maniax, 12″)
- 2009 – Luftbahn (as member from Deichkind)
- 2009 – Fight Club (als Electro Ferris, 12″)
- 2009 – Fight Club Round 2 (ass Electro Ferris, 12″)
- 2009 – Schattenwelt (as Electro Ferris mit Stereofunk)
- 2010 – Sonnenlicht feat. Markus Lange & Denis Naidanow (als Electro Ferris)
- 2011 – Stab (as Electro Ferris mit Nikolai)
- 2011 – you got the Body Baby (as Electro Ferris mit Markus Lange)
- 2012 – Bück dich hoch (as member from Deichkind)
- 2012 – Leider geil (as member from Deichkind)
- 2012 – Überfallkommando (as Ferris MC mit den Discodogs)
- 2012 – Blood Red (as Ferris Hilton, 12″)
- 2012 – Weltuntergang (feat. Swiss)
- 2013 – Killah (as Ferris Hilton, 12″)
- 2015 – All die schönen Dinge
- 2015 – Roter Teppich
- 2018 – Für Deutschland reichts
- 2019 – Phönix aus der Klapse (feat. Swiss, EP)
- 2020 – Bullenwagen (feat. Shocky & Swiss + die Andern)
- 2020 – Wir sterben alle
- 2020 – Missglückte Asimetrie
- 2020 – Kein Kompliment
- 2020 – 13. Stock
- 2020 – Du hast eine Rolex
- 2021 – Advent Advent ein Nazi brennt (with Swiss und die Andern, SHOCKY, Tamas, ZSK, Lord of the Lost & Diggen)
- 2022 – Partisanen
- 2022 – Alle hassen Ferris
- 2024 – Nashorn
- 2024 – Einklang
- 2024 – Die Goldene Ära
- 2024 – Trauma
