= Only in My Dreams (disambiguation) =

"Only in My Dreams" is a 1986 song by Debbie Gibson.

Only in My Dreams may also refer to:

== Songs ==
- "Only in My Dreams", a 1959 song by Frank Fafara
- "Only in My Dreams", a 1985 song by Steps from Greatest Hits
- "Only in My Dreams", a 1994 song by George Ducas from George Ducas
- "Only in My Dreams", a 1996 song by the Tokens from Tonight the Lion Dances
- "Only in My Dreams", a 2004 song by Bon Jovi from 100,000,000 Bon Jovi Fans Can't Be Wrong
- "Only in My Dreams", a 2005 song by Tim Brummett from You Only Live Twice
- "Exit Calypsan (Only in My Dreams)", a 2005 song by Falling Up from Dawn Escapes
- "Only in My Dreams", a 2007 song by Acoustic Alchemy from This Way
- "Only in My Dreams", a 2011 song by Power Quest from Blood Alliance
- "Only in My Dreams", a 2012 song by Ariel Pink's Haunted Graffiti from Mature Themes

== Other media ==
- Only in My Dreams, a 1997 novel by Kimberly Raye

== See also ==
- "I'll Be Home for Christmas (If Only in My Dreams)", a 1943 song popularized by Bing Crosby
