= Daniel Lopes =

German-Brazilian singer and songwriter (born 1976)

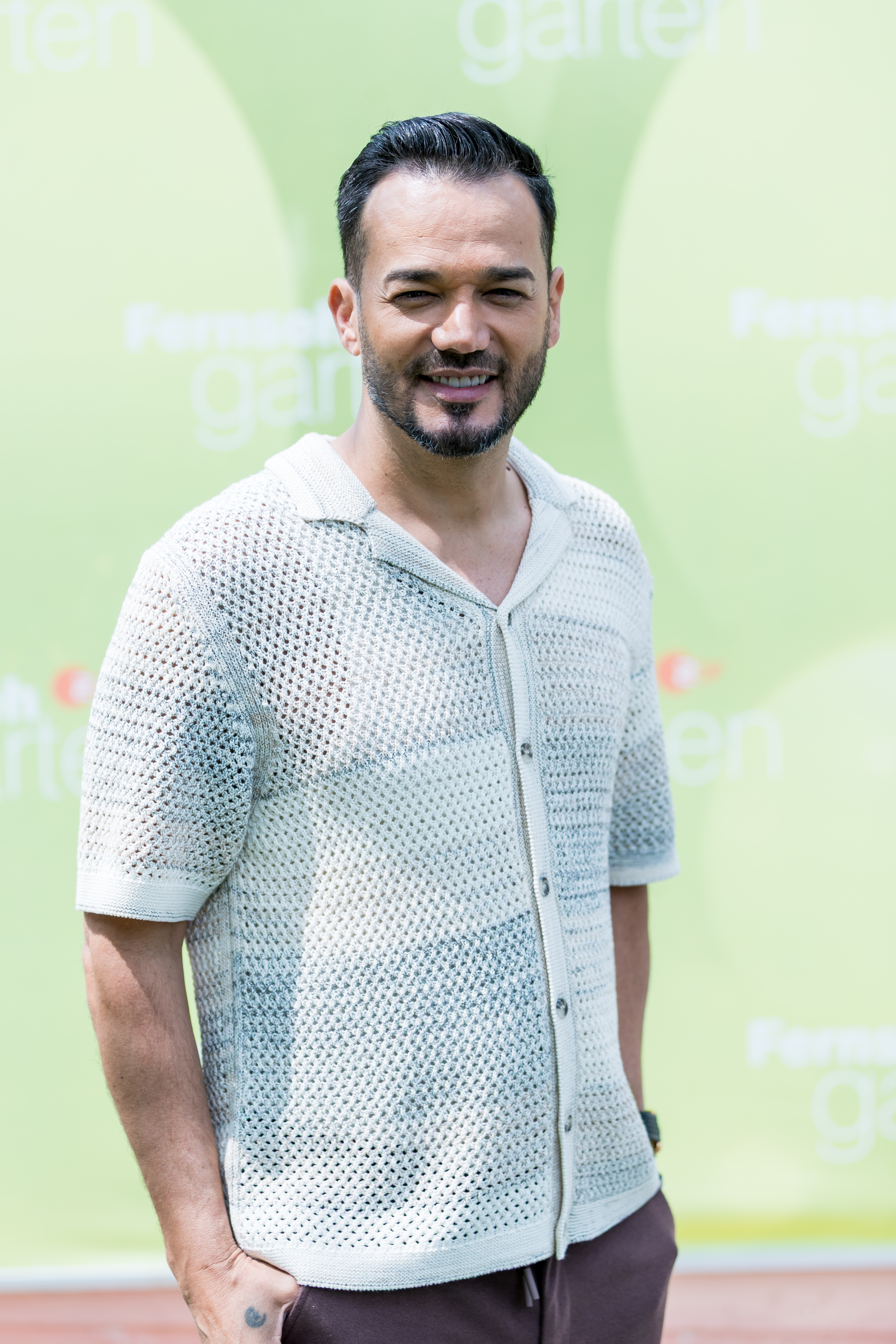
- Lopes in 2025.

Background information
- Born: 12 November 1976 (age 49); Brazil
- Occupation: Singer
- Years active: 2002–present

Daniel Lopes (born 12 November 1976) is a German-Brazilian singer and songwriter. He came to fame as a contestant on the debut season of the television series Deutschland sucht den Superstar, the German Idol series adaptation.

== Early life ==
Lopes was born in Brazil and adopted by his German stepfather. During the show, he dated fellow contestant Juliette Schoppmann. They have since broken up.

Lopes was eliminated on 11 January 2003, and ended 7th on the show. After his elimination, he was signed to a label. His album For You (on CD and DVD, produced by Frank Farian) was released in February 2003, while the competition was still going on. Because of this, he was apparently dropped from the tour. Lopes released 2 singles off of For You: "Shine On" and "I Love You More Than Yesterday". "Shine On" reached No. 14 in the German charts in March 2003. He has released two other singles including "Last Christmas/I Used To Cry" (which came out in late 2003) and "Change The World" (released in 2005).

== DSDS performances ==
- Top 30: "Angel" (Jon Secada)
- Top 10: "Livin' La Vida Loca" (Ricky Martin)
- Top 9: "Careless Whisper" (George Michael) – Bottom 2
- Top 8: "Hero" (Enrique Iglesias)
- Top 7: "A Whole New World" (Aladdin) – Eliminated

== Discography ==
=== Albums ===
- For You (February 2003)

=== Singles ===
- "Shine On" (February 2003)
- "I Love You More Than Yesterday" (June 2003)
- "Last Christmas/I Used To Cry" (late 2003)
- "Change the World" (2005).
