= Gracia Baur =

German singer and songwriter

Gracia
- Born: Gracia Arabella Baur; 18 November 1982 (age 43); Munich, Bavaria, West Germany
- Genres: Rock
- Occupation: Singer
- Years active: 2003–present
- Labels: BMG (Hansa) (2003–2004); Bros Music (2005–present)

Gracia Arabella Baur (born 18 November 1982), sometimes known mononymously as Gracia, is a German singer and songwriter. She rose to fame as a finalist on the debut season of the television series Deutschland sucht den Superstar, the German Idol series adaptation, placing fifth.

== Biography ==
Gracia was born in Munich on 18 November 1982 to Roman and Rosemary Baur and was named after Princess Grace (Gracia Patricia) of Monaco, who had died a few weeks earlier. Gracia's identical twin sister was called Patricia after the princess.

During her teenage years, she took vocal lessons to strengthen her voice. To fulfill her dreams of a career as a professional singer, she started recording demos and passed several auditions. In 2000, she even made it through the first round of Popstars, but was forced out when she forgot the words of her song.

In 2002/2003, she took part in Deutschland sucht den Superstar, the German version of Pop Idol, and eventually reached fifth place. Pushed by the publicity she released her first album Intoxicated, which peaked at #10 on the German album charts and spawned the hit singles "I Don't Think So" and "I Believe In Miracles". Afterwards, she teamed up with fellow DSDS runners-up Daniel Küblböck, Nektarios Bamiatzis, and Stephanie Brauckmeyer, releasing the charity single "Don't Close Your Eyes" under the name 4 United.

Gracia was selected to represent Germany in the Eurovision Song Contest 2005 with the song "Run & Hide", produced and composed by David Brandes. After the German national pre-selection for the Eurovision Song Contest it was revealed that Brandes had bought thousands of his own CDs to ensure chart placement, a requirement of the pre-selection (the single had actually hit the top 30 on the German charts). In contrast to the Swiss entry Vanilla Ninja, who had also had their entry produced by Brandes, Gracia opted to continue her association with the newly controversial figure.

However, "Run & Hide", a modern pop-rock song with heavy use of synthesizers, failed to catch the audience's imagination in the Eurovision Song Contest and ignominiously placed last (24th), with just four points, two each from Moldova and Monaco (who both used jury rather than televoting). Gracia, however, was not deterred ("Well, somebody has to finish last" was her laconic comment after the show), and went on with her second solo album Passion, released in November 2005.

In 2004, she recorded Götter der Ewigkeit, part of the German soundtrack of the Walt Disney Feature Animation Brother Bear.

In December 2006, Gracia released the Song "Cos I believe" together with Marvin Broadie under the name "Xantoo". It charted at #39.

== Discography ==
=== Studio albums ===
Title	Album details	Peak chart positions		
Title	Album details	GER	AUT	SWI
Intoxicated	Released: 13 October 2003; Label: Hansa, BMG; Formats: CD, digital download	10	—	67
Passion	Released: 25 November 2005; Label: Bros Music; Formats: CD, digital download	—	—	—

=== Singles ===
List of singles, with selected chart positions
Title	Year	Peak chart positions			Album
Title	Year	GER	AUT	SWI	Album
"I Don't Think So"	2003	3	20	12	Intoxicated
"I Believe In Miracles"	2003	12	42	56	Intoxicated
"Don’t Close Your Eyes" (as part of 4 United)	2004	18	50	—	non-album release
"Run & Hide"	2005	20	57	—	Passion
"When the Last Tear's Been Dried"	2005	32	—	—	Passion
"Never Been"	2006	39	—	—	Passion
"Cos I Believe" (as part of Xantoo)	2006	39	—	—	non-album release

== See also ==
- Eurovision Song Contest 2005
- Germany in the Eurovision Song Contest

Preceded by Max with Can't Wait Until Tonight	Germany in the Eurovision Song Contest; 2005	Succeeded by Texas Lightning with No No Never
