= Daniel Küblböck =

German singer (1985–2018)

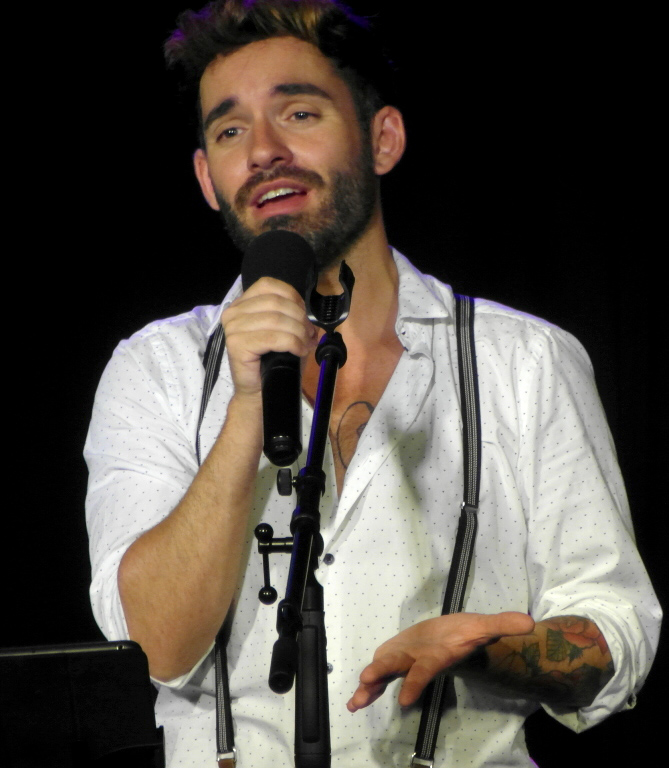
- Küblböck in concert in 2016
- Born: Daniel Dominik Küblböck; 27 August 1985; Hutthurm, Lower Bavaria, West Germany
- Disappeared: 9 September 2018 (aged 33); Labrador Sea about 185 km north of St. John's, Newfoundland and Labrador, Canada
- Status: Declared dead in absentia 10 March 2021
- Other names: Daniel K.; Daniel Kaiser-Küblböck; Lana Kaiser; Rosa Luxemburg
- Occupations: Singer; television personality
- Years active: 2002–2018
- Musical career
- Genres: Pop; jazz; country
- Instrument: Vocals

Daniel Dominik Kaiser-Küblböck (born Küblböck; 27 August 1985 – 9 September 2018) was a German singer, best known for placing third in the television talent show Deutschland sucht den Superstar in 2003. In the years that followed, he remained present in the media through work as a jazz singer and entrepreneur, as an actor and narrator in films and audio books, and by taking part in reality shows.

In September 2018, Küblböck went missing at sea off Canada while travelling on a cruise ship, and was declared dead on 10 March 2021. Shortly before the disappearance, Küblböck was reported to have privately expressed a desire to assume a female identity with the name Lana Kaiser.

== Career ==
Küblböck rose to stardom in late 2002 when he participated in the first season of German talent show Deutschland sucht den Superstar (DSDS). He gained the most viewer votes in three of the nine rounds of the competition and received the second-most votes in a further three rounds. Together with other participants, Daniel recorded the album United which included the number 1 single "We Have a Dream". He finished the season in third place overall.

After DSDS, Küblböck signed a contract with BMG. In March 2003, he released his debut solo single, "You Drive Me Crazy", which topped the German sales chart. The follow-up single, "Heartbeat", and Daniel's debut album Positive Energie both reached no. 2 in Germany and achieved major success in Austria and Switzerland. In September 2003, he launched a perfume line for children in three fragrances under his name. He also released an autobiography Ich lebe meine Töne. Küblböck invested the proceeds from his album Positive Energie amounting to around one million euros in a solar plant in Lower Bavaria, which would bring him high monthly profits.

In early 2004, he participated in Ich bin ein Star – Holt mich hier raus!, the German version of I'm a Celebrity...Get Me Out of Here!, where he came third. He then released a cover of "The Lion Sleeps Tonight" which reached the top 10 in Germany and the top 40 on the Austrian and Swiss charts. His next single, the ballad "Teenage Tears", sold 10,000 copies. In August, Küblböck's biographical musical film Daniel – Der Zauberer was released, in which he played a fictionalized version of himself. The film was critically panned and bombed at the box office. At the end of 2004, he released the charity single "Don't Close Your Eyes" with three others DSDS participants under the moniker 4 United, in support of Ärzte ohne Grenzen (Doctors Without Borders). It was a moderate chart success.

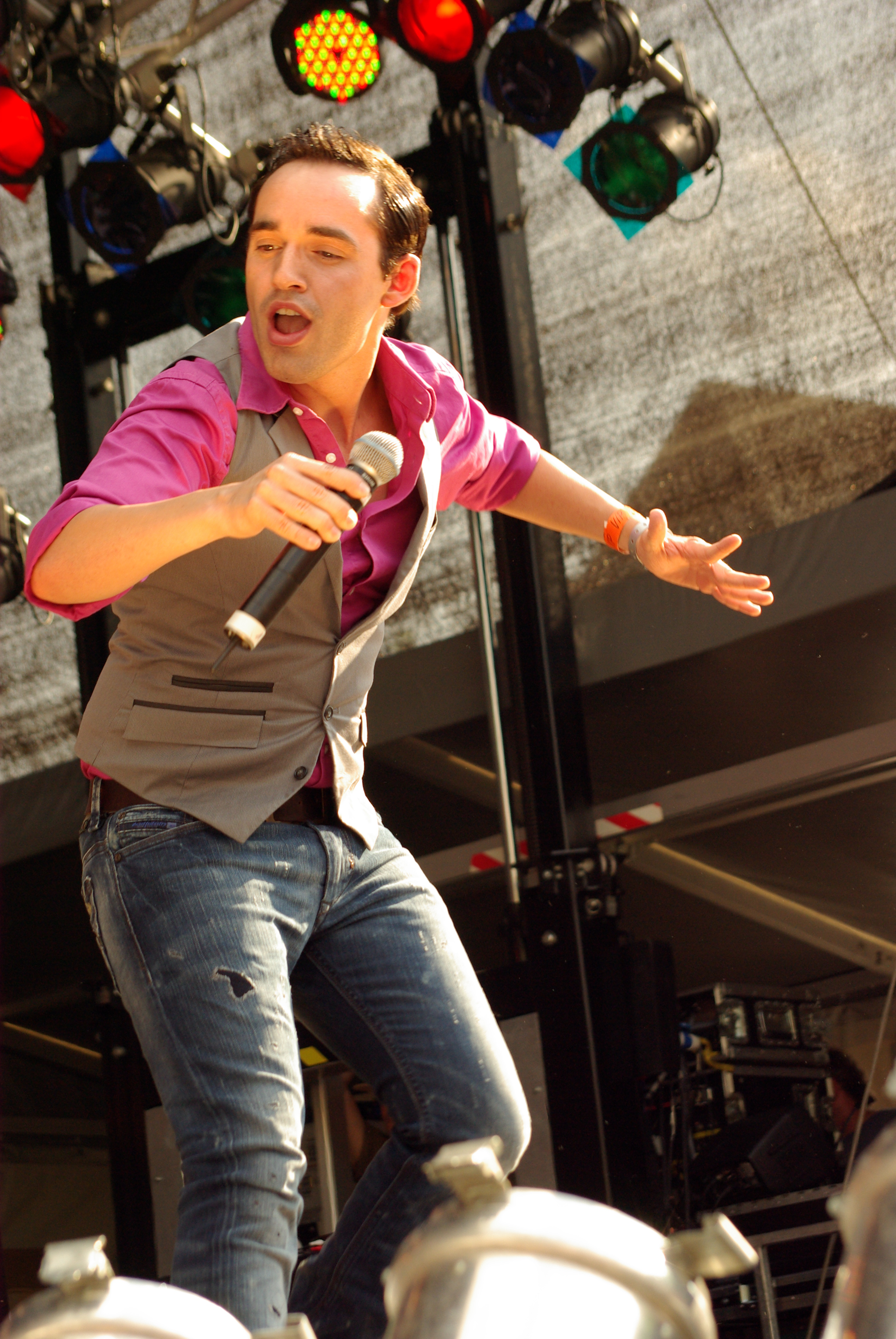
Küblböck performing in 2009

In 2005, Küblböck launched his own marketing company Positive Energie. In November 2005, he released his second album, Liebe Nation, recorded in German. It only reached no. 54 in Germany, and the accompanying single "König von Deutschland" was a moderate chart success. The next single, country-inspired "Born in Bavaria", was his last ever to chart. Küblböck's subsequent albums were released independently. 2009 saw the release of the jazz album Jazz Meets Blues... Wenn zwei sich verlieben and his first Christmas CD Leise rieselt der Schnee. The following year, he released Schrebergarten and a two-disc compilation Best of 2003–2010. None of these albums managed to enter any sales charts.

In 2011, he started hosting his own talk show Daniels Bistro. In 2012, he released the album Diez años Kúblbóck – Ich versteh’ nur Spanisch which included some material recorded in Spanish and influenced by Latin pop. As Daniel Kaiser he submitted the song "Be a Man" to the German national pre-selection for the 2014 Eurovision Song Contest, but it was rejected by the jury. In spring 2015, he took part in the eighth season of the German dance show Let's Dance, where he finished sixth, together with his dancing partner Otlile Mabuse. In early 2016, he released his final album, Jesus Is My Lover.

== Personal life ==
=== Family ===
Küblböck's parents were Günther, a German, and Bianca, a woman of Italian descent. He had four brothers: Andreas, Michael, Günther and Dennis, and one sister, Jasmin.

While living in Mallorca, he met and befriended German millionaire Kerstin Elisabeth Kaiser who would later officially adopt him. Daniel subsequently adopted the double-barrelled surname Kaiser-Küblböck.

=== Sexual orientation and gender identity ===
In 2010, Küblböck came out as gay, after previously describing himself as bisexual.

After his disappearance, it was reported that Küblböck had privately discussed wanting to live out a female identity under the name "Lana Kaiser". Another passenger on the ship said in September 2018 that Küblböck had privately described a plan to have gender reassignment surgery to become a woman and had said that he had begun hormone therapy. Shortly before the disappearance, Küblböck created an Instagram account with the name "Rosa Luxemburg", on which he described himself as "transsexual".

In 2020, artist Philipp Gufler created a 13-minute short film and a magazine about Lana Kaiser. The film was shown, among others, at the 67th Short Film Festival in Oberhausen and in the group exhibition Sweat in the Haus der Kunst, Munich.

=== Legal trouble ===
On 24 February 2004, Küblböck was injured when he collided with a truck while driving a car without a licence near Pfarrkirchen. He was fined €25,000 and sentenced to eight hours of community service.

=== 2018 disappearance ===
Küblböck was a private passenger on the cruise ship AIDAluna that left Hamburg on 29 August 2018, bound for New York City. At around 5 a.m. (local time) on 9 September, he jumped overboard. The vessel was in open waters about 185 km north of St. John's in the Labrador Sea. The water temperature was about 10.5 °C (50.9 °F).

The Canadian Coast Guard launched a search operation, assisted by the cruise ships AIDAluna and MS Zuiderdam. On 10 September, the search was abandoned, because the maximum survival time in cold water was exceeded. Under German law, a person missing at sea can be declared dead after six months have elapsed and a motion is filed by an eligible party. In August 2020, an application was submitted to declare Küblböck dead or to present evidence by 30 September 2020 that he is alive. On 10 March 2021, the Amtsgericht (district court) Passau declared Küblböck dead, setting his death date as 9 September 2018, 8:55 a.m. local time.

In the weeks leading up to the disappearance, Küblböck's friends noticed changes in his personality and signs of psychological problems, unsuccessfully trying to dissuade him from going on the cruise. Other passengers on the ship also reported Daniel's erratic behaviour, mood swings, and psychological problems.

== Discography ==
=== Studio albums ===
Year	Title	Chart positions			Certifications
Year	Title	GER	AUT	SWI	Certifications
2003	Positive Energie	2	11	13	GER: Gold
2005	Liebe Nation	54	—	—	
2009	Jazz Meets Blues... Wenn zwei sich verlieben	—	—	—	
2010	Schrebergarten	—	—	—	
2012	Diez años Kúblbóck – Ich versteh' nur Spanisch	—	—	—	
2016	Jesus Is My Lover	—	—	—	

=== Christmas albums ===
- 2009: Leise rieselt der Schnee
- 2010: Küblböckische Weihnacht – 24 Dates
- 2011: Küblböckische Weihnacht – Ruhe vor dem Sturm

=== Live albums ===
- 2008: Zero to Sexy – Live
- 2011: Schrebergarten – Live
- 2012: El tiempo – Live
- 2013: Diez años Kúblbóck – Ich versteh' nur Spanisch – Live
- 2014: Die Küblböck Live Show

=== Compilations ===
- 2010: Best of 2003–2010

=== Singles ===
Year	Title	Chart positions			Certifications	Album
Year	Title	GER	AUT	SWI	Certifications	Album
2003	"You Drive Me Crazy"	1	4	10	GER: Gold	Positive Energie
2003	"Heartbeat"	2	5	11		Positive Energie
2004	"The Lion Sleeps Tonight"	7	29	37		—N/a
2004	"Teenage Tears"	16	46	—		—N/a
2005	"König von Deutschland"	29	67	—		Liebe Nation
2007	"Born in Bavaria"	54	—	—		—N/a
2010	"Bodenmais (moacht's eich auf)"	—	—	—		Best of 2003–2010
2012	"El tiempo"	—	—	—		Diez años Kúblbóck – Ich versteh' nur Spanisch
2012	"No destroces mi corazón"	—	—	—		Diez años Kúblbóck – Ich versteh' nur Spanisch
2013	"Berlin"	—	—	—		Diez años Kúblbóck – Ich versteh' nur Spanisch
2013	"Amo el mar"	—	—	—		Diez años Kúblbóck – Ich versteh' nur Spanisch
2013	"Ein Stück von dir"	—	—	—		
2014	"Angel"	—	—	—		Jesus Is My Lover
2015	"Save My Heart"	—	—	—		Jesus Is My Lover

=== Other appearances ===
Year	Title	Chart positions			Album
Year	Title	GER	AUT	SWI	Album
2003	"We Have a Dream" (as member of DSDS All-Stars)	1	2	1	United
2004	"Don't Close Your Eyes" (as member of 4 United)	18	50	—	—N/a

=== DVDs ===
- 2004: Live on PE Tour 2003
- 2004: My Life Is Magic
- 2007: Jazz Night
- 2008: Back to the Roots
- 2009: Jazz Meets Blues... Wenn zwei sich verlieben
- 2011: Schrebergarten Berlin
- 2013: Diez años Kúblbóck – Ich versteh' nur Spanisch – Live in Berlin

== Filmography ==
- 2003: St. Angela (TV series; guest appearance)
- 2004: Daniel – Der Zauberer ("Daniel the Wizard" or "Daniel the Sorcerer") (feature film; starring as himself)
- 2004: Crazy Race 2 – Warum die Mauer wirklich fiel (feature film; minor role)

== TV shows ==
- 2002–03: Deutschland sucht den Superstar
- 2004: Ich bin ein Star – Holt mich hier raus!
- 2005: Big Brother
- 2011–14: Daniels Bistro
- 2015: Let's Dance

== Bibliography ==
- Küblböck, Daniel in collaboration with Julia Boenisch (2003). Ich lebe meine Töne. Munich: Random House, 223 pages. ISBN 3-8090-3021-X.
- Küblböck, Daniel (2007). My Way: Konzertbildband August 2005 bis Dezember 2006. Positive Energie GmbH, 103 pages.
- Küblböck, Daniel (2010). My Way 2: Konzertbildband 2007 bis 2010. Positive Energie GmbH.
- Küblböck, Daniel (2017). My Way 3: Konzertbildband September 2010 bis April 2017. Positive Energie GmbH.

== See also ==
- List of people who disappeared mysteriously at sea
