= Judith Lefeber =

German singer (born 1981)

- Birth name: Judith Mahdavi Lefeber
- Born: 14 March 1981 (age 44); Karnataka, India
- Origin: Germany
- Genres: Pop
- Occupation: Singer
- Years active: 2002–present
- Labels: Warner Music (2003); Zyx Music (2004–present)
- Website: web.archive.org/web/20060613063518/http://judith-lefeber.de/

Judith Mahdavi Lefeber (born 14 March 1981) is a German singer, who gained fame as a finalist of the first season of the television show Deutschland sucht den Superstar, the German version of Pop Idol.

== Biography ==
Lefeber was born in Manipal, Karnataka, India. At six months old, she was adopted by a couple from Germany and grew up in Rheda-Wiedenbrück near Gütersloh alongside her adoptive brother; who is seven years her senior. She started taking vocal, piano and ballet lessons at four years old, followed-up by joining the local girl's choir. After her high school graduation, Lefeber went on studying singing and piano at the conservatory in Detmold. Shortly afterwards, she moved to Essen.

In 2002, Lefeber participated in the first season of Deutschland sucht den SuperStar. Although she was widely considered as the favourite finalist right from the beginning of the show, she decided to leave DSDS after her second performance, explaining that personal issues that had arisen. However, after the final show it was revealed that Lefeber had received the highest percent of votes both during the top 10 and top 9 shows.

Afterwards Lefeber signed a contract with Warner Music. Released in fall 2003, her debut album In My Dreams saw comparatively big success, peaking at number 17 on the German albums chart (almost two years after her quit from DSDS), while the album's singles reached number 13 ("I Will Follow You") and number 70 ("Everybody Does") respectively on the national singles chart.

In 2004, Lefeber was engaged for the leading role in the musical Aida in Essen. Simultaneously, she released her second album In My Room after a sudden label change to Zyx Music. Due to a lack of promotion, both the album and the same-titled single saw less to no commercial success. The singer has since focused on starring in stage musicals.

== Discography ==
=== Studio albums ===
List of albums, with selected chart positions and certifications
Title	Album details	Peak chart positions			Certifications
Title	Album details	GER	AUT	SWI	Certifications
In My Dreams	Released: 29 October 2003; Label: Warner Music; Formats: CD, digital download	17	—	—	
In My Room	Released: 25 October 2004; Label: ZYX Music; Formats: CD, digital download	—	—	—	

=== Singles ===
Year	Single	Peak chart positions			Album
Year	Single	GER	AUT	SWI	Album
2003	"I Will Follow You"	13	—	61	In My Dreams
2003	"Everybody Does"	70	—	—	In My Dreams
2004	"In My Room"	—	—	—	In My Room
"—" denotes releases that did not chart or were not released.
