= Vanessa Struhler =

Vanessa S.
- Born: Vanessa Struhler; 4 November 1985 (age 40)
- Origin: Oberhausen, North Rhine-Westphalia, Germany
- Genres: R&B / Pop
- Occupation: Singer-songwriter
- Years active: 2003–2007
- Label: Sony BMG

Vanessa Struhler (born 4 November 1985 in Oberhausen, North Rhine-Westphalia), better known as Vanessa S., is a German singer and songwriter who came to fame as a finalist of the first season of the television show Deutschland sucht den SuperStar, the German version of Pop Idol.

== Biography ==
Struhler was born in Oberhausen, (Germany) to a Filipina mother, Lorna Abracosa, and a German father, Klaus Struhler. She has a younger brother, Christian.

In 2002, Struhler participated in the first season of Deutschland sucht den SuperStar. She was only 17 at the time and the youngest contestant. Though she received a wildcard and became the last candidate to join the ten finalists, Struhler was able to boost her popularity constantly with performances of Christina Milian's "When You Look at Me", Oleta Adams' "Get Here" or Vanessa L. Williams' "Save The Best For Last". However, in the end she was voted out on 8 February 2003 and thus finished in fourth place in the competition. As of 2007, she holds the record for the most times in the bottom three on the series.

After the show, Struhler teamed up with Hip-Hop producer DJ Tomekk to create her debut album. The pre-release duet "Ride or Die (I Need You)", a collaboration with German rapper Trooper Da Don, became a major hit, eventually peaking at No. 4 on the German singles chart. In summer of 2003, Struhler (now performing under her pseudonym Vanessa S.) released her R&B influenced first album Ride With Me. The album managed to peak at No. 30 on the albums chart but failed to earn critical and commercial success, selling 30,000 copies only. Nevertheless, Struhler's records company decided to release three further singles, including the double A-Single "Ey Ey Ey/Back To Life", which became another Top 20 hit.

Vanessa Struhler's second album Independence was released in 2004. The partly self-written album failed to chart on the German 100, but spawned three singles with "Blah, Blah, Blah" featuring David Jassy, "Don't Say (You're Sorry)" and "Bonafide".

Struhler was focusing on Eastern European and Asian markets, and she achieved a Promo Tour in China and gave a concert in Poland.

== Albums ==
=== Studio albums ===
List of albums, with selected chart positions and certifications
Title	Album details	Peak chart positions		
Title	Album details	GER	AUT	SWI
Ride with Me	Released: 25 August 2003; Label: Sony Music; Formats: CD, digital download	30	—	—
Independence	Released: 25 October 2004; Label: Sony Music; Formats: CD, digital download	—	—	—

=== Singles ===
List of singles, with selected chart positions, showing year released and album name
Year	Single	Peak chart positions			Album
Year	Single	GER	AUT	SWI	Album
"Ride Or Die (I Need You)" (with Trooper Da Don)	2003	4	55	70	Ride with Me
"Fiesta" (featuring Ferris MC)	2003	22	50	60	Ride with Me
"Ey Ey Ey"/"Back to Life" (featuring Said)	2003	17	51	—	Ride with Me
"One Single Tear"	2003	40	—	—	Ride with Me
"Blah Blah Blah"	2004	57	—	—	Independence
"Don't Say (You're Sorry)"	2004	—	—	—	Independence
"Bonafide"	2005	—	—	—	Independence
"—" denotes releases that did not chart or were not released.

=== Features ===
- Bitza feat. Vanessa S. – Take Me Slow (2005) on the album Sinuciderea unui înger
- Taichi feat. Vanessa S. – Leb dein Traum (2006) on the album Top Story
- Robird Styles feat. Vanessa S. – Unendlichkeit (2006) on the album Charterflug
- Taichi feat. Vanessa S. – Keine Wahl (2007) on the album Aussenseiter
- Taichi feat. Kobra & Vanessa S. – Ich denk an dich Pt. II (2006) on the album Aussenseiter
