= Marco Matias (musician) =

Marco Matias is the son of Portuguese immigrants who came to Germany in the 1970s. At the age of ten, he had his first experiences on stage when he was performing for a game circus, a project that arose in co-operation with Caritas and endeavored to inspire children for creativity. He himself got a lot of ideas out of this project. Shortly afterwards, he founded a duet with his brother Jorge and they had a lot of success presenting their songs – pop, rock and South American titles – at various private events.

The first band he joined when he was fifteen was called ‘Lua Cheia’. He gained his first studio experiences with his school band ‘The Basement Kids’ during the production of his first CD ‘Cry For Peace’. He then passed his higher school certificate examination and began his studies at the University of Cologne. But he never gave up his music; he worked as a backing vocalist, participated in jam sessions and had many other musical activities.

At that time, he got in contact with the Cologne A cappella ensemble ‘Voice Sings’ with whom he toured a lot.

In 2000, Marco and his band ‘Atlanticos’ participated in an ‘international Festival For Young People Of The Portuguese Communities 2000’. The festival was broadcast live to the Portuguese speaking territories all over the world. Portuguese people living in Australia, Macao, Brazil and other territories watched his performance and Marco and his band received a tremendous reaction from the televoters and made third place. They produced an album in Portuguese and were doing a lot of TV-Shows and radio performances in the following years 2001 and 2002.

In 2003, he was invited to a casting called ‘The German Voice 2003’. He was elected from among 12,000 candidates and entered the final with nine other competitors. In that final he became second.

‘A Miracle Of Love’ is the title of the song written by Ralph Siegel that Marco performed, together with Nicole Süßmilch, during the German pre-selection for the Eurovision Song Contest 2005 and they again made a very good second place.

In 2006, Marco competed in the Eurovision Song Contest 2006 as a part of the group six4one, representing Switzerland, with the song, "If We All Give A Little".
