= Ich bin ein Star – Die große Dschungelshow =

German reality television series

- Genre: Reality television
- Presented by: Sonja Zietlow; Daniel Hartwich
- Country of origin: Germany
- Original language: German
- No. of seasons: 1
- No. of episodes: 15

Production
- Producer: ITV Studios Germany
- Production locations: Nobeo studios, Hürth-Efferen, Germany
- Running time: 110 min.

Original release
- Network: RTL Television
- Release: January 15 – January 29, 2021

Ich bin ein Star – Die große Dschungelshow (I'm a star - The big jungle show) is a German special show of the reality show Ich bin ein Star – Holt mich hier raus! and began airing on January 15, 2021 and ended on January 29, 2021 on RTL Television. In 15 live episodes, the first candidate for the 15th season in 2022 was determined among the participants. Also the winner would get €50.000. Filip Pavlović won the show.

== Production ==
Due to the COVID-19 pandemic, the 15th season of the original show, was originally planned for 2021 to take place for the first time in the history of the show not in Australia, but in North Wales, at Gwrych Castle. On October 22, 2020, it was announced that production in Wales was canceled and RTL was working on a new concept. On December 1, 2020, it was announced that from January 15, 2021 a new show under the name Ich bin ein Star – Die große Dschungelshow would take place. In 15 live episodes, the first candidate for the 15th season in 2022 will be found among the participants. In addition, former campers look back on the past 14 seasons. Production takes place in the Nobeo studios in Hürth-Efferen.

Like in the original show, since 2013 Sonja Zietlow and Daniel Hartwich have been moderators, also in this show they are the moderators. The paramedic Bob McCarron alias "Dr. Bob" is also back.

== Format ==
This year the candidates live in what is known as a Tiny-house. The first three candidates each fight for three days for two places in the semi-final show. The viewers decides who are going in the semi-final. Also in this show, the candidates have to do every day Bushtucker trials and win stars. The eight candidates of the semi-final show will then fight to entry into the final show. The winner of the show will be the first participant in the 15th season in 2022 and will receive €50,000.

== Celebrities ==
On January 8, 2021, the twelve participants were announced. On January 11, 2021, RTL announced that drag queen Nina Queer, who had self-deprecatedly referred to as a "Hitler tranny" in the past due to racially interpreted statements about homophobic attacks, was replaced with Sam Dylan.

Celebrity	Known for	Status
Filip Pavlović	Reality TV performer (Die Bachelorette, Bachelor in Paradise, Like Me – I’m Famous winner)	Winner on 29 January 2021
Djamila Rowe	Distributor of an alleged affair with Thomas Borer, Reality TV performer (Die Alm, Big Brother, Adam sucht Eva – Promis im Paradies)	Runner-up on 29 January 2021
Mike Heiter	Reality TV performer (Love Island, Get the F*ck Out of My House, Das Sommerhaus der Stars – Kampf der Promipaare), TV presenter (Just Tattoo of Us)	Third place on 29 January 2021
Lars Tönsfeuerborn	Podcaster, Reality TV performer (Prince Charming winner)	Eliminated 9th on 29 January 2021
Sam Dylan	Reality TV performer (Prince Charming, Kampf der Realitystars – Schiffbruch am Traumstrand)	Eliminated 8th on 28 January 2021
Christina Dimitriou	Reality TV performer (Temptation Island – Versuchung im Paradies, Ex on the Beach, CoupleChallenge – Das stärkste Team gewinnt)	Eliminated 7th on 28 January 2021
Lydia Kelovitz	Singer (Deutschland sucht den Superstar)	Eliminated 6th on 27 January 2021
Zoe Saip	Model, Reality TV performer (Germany's Next Topmodel, Kampf der Realitystars – Schiffbruch am Traumstrand)	Eliminated 5th on 27 January 2021
Xenia Prinzessin von Sachsen	Singer, Actress, Reality TV performer (Das Sommerhaus der Stars – Kampf der Promipaare, Deutschland tanzt, CoupleChallenge – Das stärkste Team gewinnt)	Eliminated 4th on 26 January 2021
Oliver Sanne	Mister Germany 2014, Reality TV performer (Der Bachelor 2015, Bachelor in Paradise, Kampf der Realitystars – Schiffbruch am Traumstrand)	Eliminated 3rd on 23 January 2021
Bea Fiedler	Actress (Sunshine Reggae in Ibiza), photo model, playmate	Eliminated 2nd on 20 January 2021
Frank Fussbroich	Documentary soap actor (Die Fussbroichs), Reality TV performer (Big Brother, Das Sommerhaus der Stars – Kampf der Promipaare)	Eliminated 1st on 17 January 2021

== Results and elimination ==
Indicates that the celebrity received the most votes from the public
Indicates that the celebrity was in the bottom two of the public vote
Indicates that the celebrity received the fewest votes and was eliminated

Team One (Day 1-3)
Team Two (Day 4-6)
Team Three (Day 7-9)
Team Four (Day 10-12)

Team Five (Day 13)
Team Six (Day 14)
Finals (Day 15)

Daily results per celebrity
	Day 1-3	Day 4-6	Day 7-9	Day 10-12	Day 13	Day 14	Day 15 Final	
	Day 1-3	Day 4-6	Day 7-9	Day 10-12	Day 13	Day 14	Round 1	Round 2
Filip	Not in Camp			2nd 35.18%	Not in Camp	1st 38.43%	2nd 26.55%	Winner; 50.14%
Djamila	Not in Camp			1st 36.25%	Not in Camp	2nd 33.13%	1st 31.87%	Runner-up; 49.86%
Mike	1st 35.61%	Not in Camp			1st 30.92%	Not in Camp	3rd 21.60%	Eliminated (Day 15)
Lars	Not in Camp	1st 42.52%	Not in Camp		2nd 30.06%	Not in Camp	4th 19.98%	Eliminated (Day 15)
Sam	Not in Camp		1st 43.12%	Not in Camp		3rd 20.05%	Eliminated (Day 14)	
Christina	Not in Camp		2nd 31.36%	Not in Camp		4th 8.39%	Eliminated (Day 14)	
Lydia	Not in Camp	2nd 29.65%	Not in Camp		3rd 23.86%	Eliminated (Day 13)		
Zoe	2nd 33.96%	Not in Camp			4th 15.16%	Eliminated (Day 13)		
Xenia	Not in Camp			3rd 28.57%	Eliminated (Day 12)			
Oliver	Not in Camp		3rd 25.52%	Eliminated (Day 9)				
Bea	Not in Camp	3rd 27.83%	Eliminated (Day 6)					
Frank	3rd 30.43%	Eliminated (Day 3)						
Bottom two	Frank; Zoe	Bea; Lydia	Christina; Oliver	Filip; Xenia	None			
Eliminated	Frank; 30.43% to save	Bea; 27.83% to save	Oliver; 25.52% to save	Xenia; 28.57% to save	Zoe; 15.16% to save	Christina; 8.39% to save	Lars; 19.98% to win	Djamila; 49.86% to win
Eliminated	Frank; 30.43% to save	Bea; 27.83% to save	Oliver; 25.52% to save	Xenia; 28.57% to save	Lydia; 23.86% to save	Sam; 20.05% to save	Mike; 21.60% to win	Filip; 50.14% to win

== Bushtucker trials ==
The contestants take part in daily trials.

Trial number	Air date	Name of trial	Celebrity participation	Number of stars	Notes
1	January 15	"Tierischer Einlauf" ("Animal enema")	Frank; Mike; Zoe	3/9 stars	1
2	January 16	"Decodieren" ("Decoding")	Frank; Mike; Zoe	0/9 stars	none
3	January 17	"Tierisch Abgedreht" ("Crazy animal")	Frank; Mike; Zoe	7/9 stars	2
4	January 18	"Durchkreische" ("Screaming through")	Bea; Lars; Lydia	2/3 stars	none
5	January 19	"Der große Preis von Hürth-Efferen" ("The Hürth-Efferen Grand Prix")	Bea; Lars; Lydia	0/6 stars	3
6	January 20	"ABC-Schock" ("ABC-Shock")	Bea; Lars; Lydia	5/9 stars	none
7	January 21	"Um Kopf und Kragen" ("To risk ones neck")	Christina; Oliver; Sam	4/12 stars	none
8	January 22	"Das Unglücksrad" ("Wheel of misfortune")	Christina; Oliver; Sam	2/10 stars	4
9	January 23	"Stern von Wurmillumbah" ("Star of Wormillumbah")	Christina; Oliver; Sam	0/1 star 10/12 stars	5
10	January 24	"Der letzte Schrei" ("The last scream")	Djamila; Filip; Xenia	6/9 stars	none
11	January 25	"Grauen Under" ("Terror Under")	Djamila; Filip; Xenia	4/8 stars	6
12	January 26	"Qualen mit Zahlen" ("Agonies with numbers")	Djamila; Filip; Xenia	0/6 stars	none
13	January 27	"Durchgedreht" ("Crazy/Spun")	Lars; Lydia; Mike; Zoe	12/12 stars	none
14	January 28	"Läuft bei dir!" ("You go!")	Christina; Djamila; Filip; Sam	5/12 stars	none
15	January 29	"My Air is Away"	Djamila; Filip; Lars; Mike	19/20 stars	none
16	January 29	"Zwei-Gänge-Dschungelmenü" ("Two-course-jungle-menu")	Djamila; Filip	0/4 stars	none

Notes

- ^1 This trial was the same as in the tenth season.
- ^2 This trial was the same as in the fourteenth season, but with the name "Alles kann, nichts muss" ("Everything is possible, nothing is necessary").
- ^3 This trial was the same as in the tenth and eleventh season, but with the name "Der große Preis von Murwillumbah" ("The Murwillumbah Grand Prix")
- ^4 This trial was the same as in the ninth season.
- ^5 All-or-nothing-trial: The contestants had to find 12 parts and put them together to form a star.
- ^6 This trial was the same as in the fourteenth season.

== Star count ==
Celebrity	Trials	Awarded stars	Possible stars	Percentage	Stars
Frank	3	2	9	22.22%	2/9 stars
Mike	5	14	17	82.35%	14/17 stars
Zoe	4	5	12	41.67%	5/12 stars
Bea	3	2	12	16.67%	2/12 stars
Lars	5	12	20	60%	12/20 stars
Lydia	4	8	15	53.33%	8/15 stars
Christina	4	2	18	11.11%	2/18 stars
Oliver	3	5	15	33.33%	5/15 stars
Sam	4	5	18	27.73%	5/18 stars
Djamila	6	10	27	37.04%	10/27 stars
Filip	6	14	27	51.85%	14/27 stars
Xenia	3	6	17	35.29%	6/17 stars

== Guest ==
In each episode, participants from the previous 14 seasons visit the studio and look back on their own season.

Episode	Season	Guest			Notes
1	8 (2014)	Melanie Müller	Julian F. M. Stoeckel	no guest	none
2	2 (Late 2004)	Désirée Nick	Willi Herren	Dolly Buster	none
3	14 (2020)	Prince Damien	Danni Büchner	Günther Krause	1
4	7 (2013)	Olivia Jones	Georgina Fleur	Iris Klein	none
5	4 (2009)	Nico Schwanz	Peter Bond	no guest	none
6	6 (2012)	Micaela Schäfer	no guest		2
7	13 (2019)	Evelyn Burdecki	Peter Orloff	Gisele Oppermann	none
8	9 (2015)	Maren Gilzer	Tanja Tischewitsch	Olivia Jones	3
9	5 (2011)	Peer Kusmagk	Sarah Knappik	no guest	none
10	3 (2008)	Ross Anthony	Isabel Edvardsson	Barbara Engel	none
11	10 (2016)	Menderes Bağcı	Thorsten Legat	David Ortega	none
12	12 (2018)	Jenny Frankhauser	Matthias Mangiapane	Natascha Ochsenknecht	none
13	1 (2004)	Carlo Thränhardt	Lucas Cordalis	no guest	4
14	11 (2017)	Marc Terenzi	Kader Loth	no guest	none
15	15 (2022)	Harald Glööckler	no guest		5

Notes

- ^1 Krause was giving a speech per video message.
- ^2 Schäfer only had a brief appearance without an interview.
- ^3 Jones was not a participant in that season.
- ^4 Cordalis is the son of Costa Cordalis, the late winner of the first season. He also confirmed his participation in 2022s fifteenth season.
- ^5 In show 15 there was no review, but Glööckler was confirmed to be the second participant in the upcoming season 15.

== Ratings ==
Ratings of Ich bin ein Star – Die große Dschungelshow
Episode	Duration (without advertising)	Date	Viewers		Share		Source
Episode	Duration (without advertising)	Date	Total	14-49 years	Total	14-49 years	Source
1	87 min.	15 January 2021	4.18 Mio.	1.99 Mio.	15.8%	28.8%	
2	74 Min.	16 January 2021	3.57 Mio.	1.64 Mio.	14.5%	22.0%	
3	88 Min.	17 January 2021	2.40 Mio.	1.03 Mio.	11.8%	17.2%	
4	84 Min.	18 January 2021	2.22 Mio.	0.94 Mio.	13.4%	20.1%	
5	90 Min.	19 January 2021	2.22 Mio.	0.90 Mio.	11.7%	16.7%	
6	48 Min.	20 January 2021	2.36 Mio.	1.04 Mio.	11.0%	17.3%	
7	87 Min.	21 January 2021	2.00 Mio.	1.00 Mio.	10.6%	19.2%	
8	85 Min.	22 January 2021	2.40 Mio.	1.11 Mio.	10.6%	16.8%	
9	93 Min.	23 January 2021	2.62 Mio.	1.19 Mio.	10.5%	17.3%	
10	91 Min.	24 January 2021	2.16 Mio.	0.92 Mio.	11.0%	15.7%	
11	92 Min.	25 January 2021	2.05 Mio.	0.92 Mio.	11.1%	18.4%	
12	50 Min.	26 January 2021	2.25 Mio.	0.93 Mio.	10.8%	16.2%	
13	52 Min.	27 January 2021	2.37 Mio.	1.11 Mio.	11.6%	20.6%	
14	51 Min.	28 January 2021	2.14 Mio.	0.98 Mio.	9.8%	16.7%	
15	69 Min.	29 January 2021	2.16 Mio.	0.98 Mio.	10.6%	16.4%	
