= I'm a Celebrity...Get Me Out of Here! =

International reality television franchise

- Created by: LWT
- Original work: I'm a Celebrity...Get Me Out of Here! (British TV series)
- Owner: ITV Studios
- Years: 2002–present

Films and television
- Television series: I'm a Celebrity...Get Me Out of Here! (independent international versions, see below)

Miscellaneous
- Genre: Reality competition
- First aired: 25 August 2002; 24 years ago
- Distributor: ITV Studios

I'm a Celebrity...Get Me Out of Here! is a reality television format in which a number of celebrities live together in a jungle environment for a number of weeks, competing to be crowned "King-" or "Queen of the Jungle".

The show was originally created in the United Kingdom and produced by ITV's then London franchise London Weekend Television (LWT) and developed by a team including James Allen, Natalka Znak, Brent Baker and Stewart Morris. The first episode was aired on 25 August 2002, hosted by Anthony McPartlin and Declan Donnelly, better known as Ant and Dec.

It is now produced by ITV Studios and has been licensed globally to countries including the United States, Germany, France, Hungary, Sweden, the Netherlands, Denmark, Romania, Russia, Australia and India.

== Filming location ==
Camp locations in Australia

The British, German and the 2003 American versions of the series take place in New South Wales, Australia, at a permanently-built up camp and filming studios on a disused banana plantation facility called Dungay Creek in Dungay near Murwillumbah. The area is technically classified by the local Tweed Shire council as a lowland subtropical rainforest, rather than a jungle as referred to in the show. However, the first British series of the show (which aired in 2002) was filmed on a smaller site close to King Ranch (officially El Rancho del Rey) in Cardstone, with a temporary studio built on the banks of Kooroomool Creek, near Tully, Queensland, in Australia. For the fifth British series in 2005, there were reportedly plans to relocate the show to the coastal town of Cardwell (also in Queensland); however these were subsequently dropped due to logistical problems and time constraints in building the new set and required infrastructure.

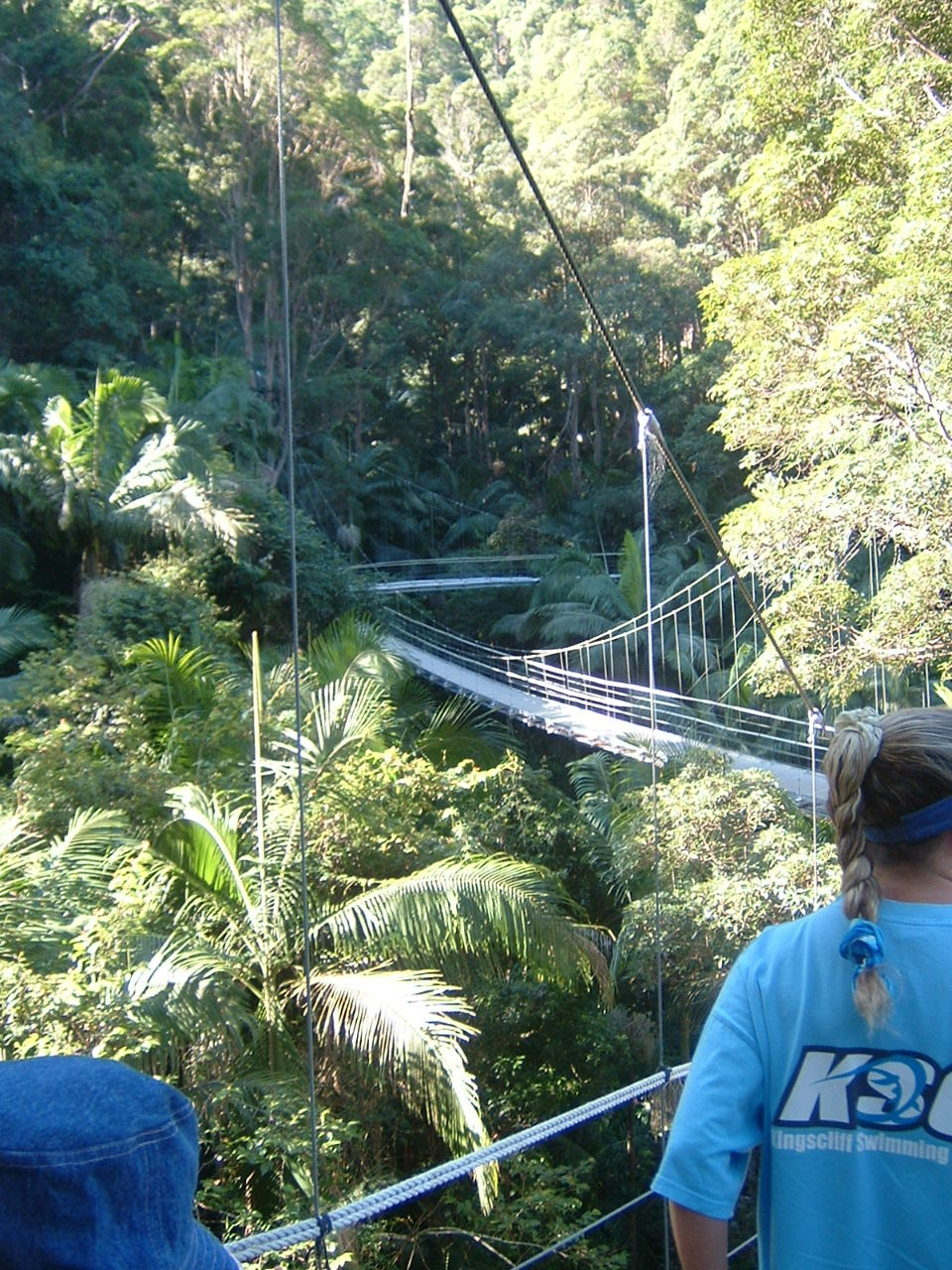
On location in the Dungay Creek 'Jungle', Dungay in north-eastern New South Wales, Australia (April 2004)

The leaseholder of the privately owned Dungay site is the British production company ITV Studios, formerly Granada Productions, which extensively redesigned and built on the previously open site and equipped it with camera and sound technology for TV broadcasting. In September 2002, the local council initially approved the company’s plans to film and produce the series. The original approval protected the local valley by capping vehicle numbers, mandating crew shuttle buses, and forcing the production company to pay for road repairs. It also banned the clearing of trees and limited all set construction to temporary structures during a brief annual filming window. The land is owned by local cattle farmer Craig Parker. About 600 mostly Australian crew members, including 136 from the UK, are involved in the yearly production and in excess of 100 cameras are used. Before a new series begins, local Australians participate in a multi-day "dry run" by living in the camp to test the production setup under exact reality conditions. These rehearsal campmates eat the same basic rations and sleep in the same environment as the incoming celebrities, while actively practicing the upcoming Bushtucker Trials. This essential rehearsal allows the production crew to verify that all cameras, safety gear, and challenges are in perfect working order before the official filming starts. Footage is used to create the preview clips of each trial.

Inside the entrance to the filming location is an open area allocated to buildings which accommodate on-site medical facilities, containers for the storage of props, and other backstage facilities. Families and friends of the celebrities are housed here each morning during evictions. A restricted access road ascends to the location of the studios from this area. The four-wheel drive access to the show's set then descends into a valley. The camp is connected to the studio building via a series of suspension bridges and a drawbridge, the latter of which was installed after contestants from the second British series left camp in protest over the small amount of food they received after a trial. A retractable canopy positioned high above the central part of camp can be used to protect the contestants and filming equipment from rainfall but is not completely weatherproof. It is also used to facilitate the delivery of food that is won in bushtucker trials. Some of the scenery in camp is artificial but was designed to blend into the natural environment, e.g. a rock wall that is used to conceal cameras and other production equipment, an area with a pond and a small pump-powered waterfall feature. In most series, a smaller secondary camp is used for a few days when the campmates are split into two competing teams to live separately. Ahead of the 2026 series, the main camp was modified to make it accessible for Ade Adepitan, the UK programme's first wheelchair-using contestant.

In both the British and German versions of the show, paramedic Bob McCarron, known informally as "Medic Bob" or "Dr. Bob" in the respective versions, and his team of assistants are responsible for the medical care and wellbeing of the celebrities and crew. McCarron was usually seen during Bushtucker Trials when medical assistance was required. In September 2022, it was reported that McCarron had decided not to return for that year's British series due to scheduling conflicts with other work commitments and was replaced by another medic/doctor off screen. McCarron did not appear in the 2020 and 2021 series filmed in Wales due to COVID-19 travel restrictions. Once eliminated from the show, the celebrities in the first series stayed at Mission Beach's Horizon hotel. Celebrities in subsequent series, and the later German adaptation, were accommodated at Palazzo Versace Gold Coast. Following the UK programme's return to Australia in 2022, production relocated to the JW Marriott Gold Coast Resort & Spa in Surfers Paradise, Queensland, while the German version remained at the original property (rebranded as Imperial Hotel Gold Coast in 2023).

Castle location in Wales

In August 2020, it was confirmed that due to the COVID-19 pandemic and related travel restrictions, the 20th UK series would be filmed in Gwrych Castle in Abergele, North Wales. The neighbouring Manorafon Farm Park was used as an additional location. Various aspects of the show were reimagined and themed around the Welsh castle setting. Filming the show in the UK required production schedules to be altered due to the change in timezones; instead of primarily filming the trials during daytime hours, they instead had to film these in the late evening, after the live show is aired, so that the recorded footage could be cut down and edited together in time to be broadcast as part of the next evening's episode. Due to the COVID-19 pandemic, the 15th season of the German version was originally planned for 2021 to take place for the first time in the history of the show not in Australia, but in North Wales, at Gwrych Castle. However, on 22 October 2020, it was announced that production in Wales had been cancelled and that broadcaster RTL was working on a new concept. On 2 August 2021, it was announced that, due to Australia's border remaining closed amid COVID-19 restrictions in the country, filming for the British version would again be taking place at Gwrych Castle in Abergele, Wales. As part of the agreement with Gwrych Castle Preservation Trust, ITV announced it would continue to help support the ongoing restoration project of the site. In October 2025, the Trust revealed that a number of props and costumes used in the two series filmed in North Wales were being sold off to raise additional funds.

Camp location in South Africa

The Australian series is usually filmed on a site near the Blyde River Canyon, which forms part of a nature reserve, in the Mpumalanga province of South Africa. The jungle camp and TV studios, which were also used later by the British, French and German versions, are based in Swadini Nature Reserve. The main filming site is close to Swadini, A Forever Resort and is located just off a waterfall trail which is accessed from a public road, where a temporary production base is housed, that continues down to the visitor information centre and observation deck for the Blyderivierpoort Dam. Between series the camp, trial sets and production facilities are almost entirely dismantled and removed from the site. The camp and trial areas are dressed with thousands of plants which are grown in bags with drip irrigation so they survive the weather conditions. Triosphere, a production company based in the country, assists in filming the series by providing local crew members. The seventh season, however, was pre-recorded in Australia during late 2020 at the site used by the British and German versions since 2003. On 18 October 2021, it was announced by RTL that the German version would now be filmed at the same location in South Africa instead of its usual home in Australia, taking the filming slot previously occupied by the Australian version. In September 2022, it was confirmed that ITV would pre-record a special "all-stars" spin-off series in South Africa, featuring former campmates and scheduled to air in 2023. To mark the show's 20th anniversary in the country, the German broadcaster launched their own all-stars version which was filmed in South Africa and broadcast in late summer 2024.

The Danish, Hungarian and Romanian versions were filmed at a different location in South Africa. Other versions of the show have been filmed in Argentina, Brazil, Colombia, Costa Rica, the Dominican Republic, Suriname, Indonesia and Malaysia.

In May 2026, media outlets began to report that ITV were planning a new spin-off series to mark the show's 25th anniversary.

== Criticism ==
This series has been criticised by Tessa Jowell, at the time the Secretary of State for Culture, Media and Sport. In an interview with the Financial Times during the second British series, she said, "If they weren't mostly – save their blushes – has-been celebrities, there might be more interest ... I think that if we saw many more programming hours taken over by reality TV, I hope you'd begin to see a viewers' revolt."

In 2002, CBS, broadcaster of the American reality show Survivor, unsuccessfully sued ABC and Granada Productions over a planned American version of I'm a Celebrity... Get Me Out of Here!, alleging similarities. The production company behind Survivor also attempted to take legal action, but this was later dropped.

The show's use of live insects and other living creatures in the bushtucker trials has led to some public criticism of the show and its producers and those involved in the programming. This issue was highlighted during the 2009 British series, where celebrity chef Gino D'Acampo killed, cooked and ate a rat. The RSPCA Australia investigated the incident and sought to prosecute D'Acampo and actor Stuart Manning for animal cruelty after this episode of the show was aired. ITV was fined but the two celebrities involved were not prosecuted for animal cruelty despite being charged with the offence by the New South Wales Police. This incident did, however, highlight among certain groups such as Buglife, a British charity for the conservation of insects, and the RSPCA, the controversy surrounding the killing of living creatures for human entertainment.

There has been criticism that the producers present the celebrities as living in a "dangerous" jungle, despite the fact that they are actually kept in a controlled environment, with some of the scenery being artificial, e.g. a pond and a small waterfall. The filming of the show in Australia has been subject to repeated complaints from local residents in the past due to traffic and noise pollution, which in 2018 reportedly led to a further fine from the local council. The fine was heavily reduced from £100,000 to £3,000 after the production company threatened to move locations. Others have raised concerns about the possible environmental damage the filming crew might be inflicting on the site.

In November 2014, TV presenter Chris Packham wrote an open letter to Ant & Dec, asking them and ITV to end the "abuse of animals" in I'm a Celebrity... Get Me Out of Here!. He described the trials as "out of date" and "silly". Packham again requested that the programme end its perceived animal abuse on stage during the 2019 TV Choice Awards, whilst imploring celebrities and those in the television industry to be more conscious of the environment.

In January 2021, the Australian version of the reality show received criticism for its "sick", "traumatic" and "unnecessary" content when a contestant was bitten by a snake in an episode.

In November 2022, the British instalment was criticized for its casting of Matt Hancock as a contestant, the serving Member of Parliament for West Suffolk who had been disgraced for his breaching of COVID-19 guidelines as Health Secretary. ITV reportedly paid Hancock £400,000 to participate.

== International versions ==
Status legend
Status	Meaning
Current	Franchise with a currently airing season
Awaiting	Franchise awaiting confirmation
Upcoming	Franchise with an upcoming season
Ended	Franchise no longer in production
Unknown	Status unknown
Original	Original version (in title column)

Versions of I'm a Celebrity...Get Me Out of Here! by country
Country	Local title	First episode	Status	Filming location	Network	Winners	Presenters
Australia	I'm a Celebrity...Get Me Out of Here!	February 1, 2015	Upcoming	Blyde River Canyon, South Africa (2015–2020, 2023–2026); Dungay, New South Wales, Australia (2021–2022)	Network Ten (2015–2026); Seven Network (2027)	Season 1, 2015: Freddie Flintoff; Season 2, 2016: Brendan Fevola; Season 3, 2017: Casey Donovan; Season 4, 2018: Fiona O'Loughlin; Season 5, 2019: Richard Reid; Season 6, 2020: Miguel Maestre; Season 7, 2021: Abbie Chatfield; Season 8, 2022: Dylan Lewis; Season 9, 2023: Liz Ellis; Season 10, 2024: Skye Wheatley; Season 11, 2025: Sam Thaiday; Season 12, 2026: Concetta Caristo; Season 13, 2027: Upcoming season	Julia Morris (2015–2026); Chris Brown (2015–2023); Robert Irwin (2024–2026); Ricki-Lee Coulter (2027); Jim Jefferies (2027)
Canada (Quebec)	Sortez-moi d'ici	February 19, 2023	Awaiting	Costa Rica (2023); Panama (2024–2025)	TVA	Season 1, 2023: Andréanne A. Malette; Season 2, 2024: Clodine Desrochers; Season 3, 2025: Jean-Michel Anctil	Alexandre Barrette (2023–2024); Jean-Philippe Dion (2023–2024); Rosalie Vaillancourt (2025); Guy Jodoin (2025)
Denmark	Jeg er en celebrity - få mig væk herfra!	March 15, 2015	Ended	Kruger National Park, South Africa	TV3	Season 1, 2015: Gustav Salinas	Jakob Kjeldbjerg; Lasse Rimmer
Finland	Olen Julkkis... Päästäkää Minut Pois!	January 21, 2022	Ended	Argentina, South America	MTV3	Season 1, 2022: Kyösti Mäkimattila	Janne Kataja; Aku Hirviniemi
France	Je suis une célébrité, sortez-moi de là !	April 14, 2006	Ended	Teresópolis, Brazil (2006); Blyde River Canyon, South Africa (2019)	TF1	Season 1, 2006: Richard Virenque; Season 2, 2019: Gerard Vives	Christophe Dechavanne; Jean-Pierre Foucault (2006); Laurence Boccolini (2019)
Germany	Ich bin ein Star – Holt mich hier raus!	January 9, 2004	Awaiting	Dungay, New South Wales, Australia (2004, 2008–2009, 2011–2020, 2023–); Blyde River Canyon, South Africa (2022)	RTL	Season 1, Early 2004: Costa Cordalis; Season 2, Late 2004: Désirée Nick; Season 3, 2008: Ross Antony; Season 4, 2009: Ingrid van Bergen; Season 5, 2011: Peer Kusmagk; Season 6, 2012: Brigitte Nielsen; Season 7, 2013: Joey Heindle; Season 8, 2014: Melanie Müller; Season 9, 2015: Maren Gilzer; Season 10, 2016: Menderes Bağcı; Season 11, 2017: Marc Terenzi; Season 12, 2018: Jenny Frankhauser; Season 13, 2019: Evelyn Burdecki; Season 14, 2020: Prince Damien Ritzinger; Season 15, 2022: Filip Pavlović; Season 16, 2023: Djamila Rowe; Season 17, 2024: Lucy Diakovska; Season 18, 2025: Lilly Becker; Season 19, 2026: Gil Ofarim	Sonja Zietlow; Dirk Bach (2004–2012); Daniel Hartwich (2013–2022); Jan Köppen (2023–)
Greece	I'm a Celebrity...Get Me Out of Here!	October 11, 2023	Ended	Santo Domingo, Dominican Republic	Skai TV	Season 1, 2023: Tasos Xiarcho	Giorgos Lianos; Kalomira
Hungary	Celeb vagyok, ments ki innen!	October 6, 2008	Current	Salto Encantado Provincial Park, Argentina (2008); Kruger National Park, South Africa (2014, 2017); Rio Claro Reserva Natural, Colombia (2022, 2026)	RTL	Season 1, October 2008: Mariann Falusi; Season 2, Oct–Nov 2008: Andrea Keleti; Season 3, October 2014: Zsolt Erdei; Season 4, Oct–Nov 2014: Andrea Molnár; Season 5, 2017: Péter Kabát; Season 6, 2022: Curtis; Season 7, 2026: Current season	Balázs Sebestyén (2008, 2014, 2022); János Vadon (2008, 2014, 2022); Ramóna Kiss (2017); Peti Puskás (2017, 2026); Bence Istenes (2026); Sipos Orsolya (2026); Árpa Attila (2026)
India	Iss Jungle Se Mujhe Bachao	July 13, 2009	Ended	Taman Negara, Malaysia	Sony	Season 1, 2009: Mona Wasu	Mini Mathur; Yudhishthir Urs
Israel	אני סלבריטי... תוציאו אותי מפה!	2027	Upcoming	TBA	Keshet 12	Season 1, 2027: Upcoming season	Rotem Sela; Assi Azar
Mexico	Soy famoso ¡sácame de aquí!	May 4, 2022	Ended	Dominican Republic	Azteca Uno	Season 1, 2022: Alfredo Adame	Horacio Villalobos; Atala Sarmiento
Netherlands	Ik Ben Een Ster, Haal Me Hier Uit!	April 20, 2014	Ended	Suriname	RTL 5	Season 1, 2014: Mathijs Vrieze	Jan Kooijman; Nicolette Kluijver
Romania	Sunt celebru, scoate-mă de aici!	February 16, 2015	Ended	Kruger National Park, South Africa (2015); La Romana, Dominican Republic (2022)	Pro TV	Season 1, 2015: Cătălin Moroșanu; Season 2, 2022: Anisia Gafton	Cabral Ibacka (2015–2022); Adela Popescu (2022); Mihai Bobonete (2015); Oana Tache (2015, backstage)
Russia	Звёзды в Африке (1–4); Звёзды в джунглях (5–)	September 19, 2021	Upcoming (Note: Since 2023, the show has aired without ITV Studios' involvement in the production.)	Kruger National Park, South Africa (1–4); Los Haitises National Park, Dominican Republic (5–); Tayrona National Park, Colombia (All-Stars)	TNT	Season 1, 2021: Vyacheslav Malafeev; Season 2, 2022: Oleg Vereshchagin; Season 3, Spring 2023: Alexander "ST" Stepanov; Season 4, Fall 2023: Evgenia Iskandarova; Season 5, 2024: Igor Chekhov; Season 6, 2025: Renat Mukhambaev; All-Stars, 2026: Upcoming season	Mikhail Galustyan; Olga Buzova
Sweden	Kändisdjungeln	September 11, 2009	Ended	Taman Negara, Malaysia	TV4	Season 1, 2009: Karl Petter Bergvall	David Hellenius; Tilde de Paula
United Kingdom	I'm a Celebrity...Get Me Out of Here! (Original)	August 25, 2002	Upcoming	Tully, Queensland, Australia (2002); Dungay, New South Wales, Australia (2003–2019, 2022–present); Gwrych Castle, Abergele, Wales, United Kingdom (2020–2021)	ITV	Series 1, 2002: Tony Blackburn; Series 2, 2003: Phil Tufnell; Series 3, Early 2004: Kerry Katona; Series 4, Late 2004: Joe Pasquale; Series 5, 2005: Carol Thatcher; Series 6, 2006: Matt Willis; Series 7, 2007: Christopher Biggins; Series 8, 2008: Joe Swash; Series 9, 2009: Gino D'Acampo; Series 10, 2010: Stacey Solomon; Series 11, 2011: Dougie Poynter; Series 12, 2012: Charlie Brooks; Series 13, 2013: Kian Egan; Series 14, 2014: Carl "Foggy" Fogarty; Series 15, 2015: Vicky Pattison; Series 16, 2016: Scarlett Moffatt; Series 17, 2017: Georgia "Toff" Toffolo; Series 18, 2018: Harry Redknapp; Series 19, 2019: Jacqueline Jossa; Series 20, 2020: Giovanna Fletcher; Series 21, 2021: Danny Miller; Series 22, 2022: Jill Scott; Series 23, 2023: Sam Thompson; Series 24, 2024: Danny Jones; Series 25, 2025: Angry Ginge, Series 26, 2026: Upcoming series	Declan Donnelly; Anthony McPartlin (2002–2017, 2019–); Holly Willoughby (2018)
United Kingdom	I'm a Celebrity...South Africa (All-Stars)	April 24, 2023	Awaiting	Blyde River Canyon, South Africa; Versa Studios, London, United Kingdom (2026 final)	ITV	Series 1, 2023: Myleene Klass; Series 2, 2026: Adam Thomas	Declan Donnelly; Anthony McPartlin
United Kingdom	I'm a Celebrity: The Wild Frontier	2027	Upcoming	Callaghan Valley, Canada	ITV	Series 1, 2027: Upcoming series	Declan Donnelly; Anthony McPartlin
United States	I'm a Celebrity...Get Me Out of Here! (1–2); Get Me Out of Here! (3)	February 19, 2003	Upcoming	Dungay, New South Wales, Australia (2003); Las Horquetas, Sarapiquí, Costa Rica (2009); Blyde River Canyon, South Africa (2027)	ABC (2003); NBC (2009); Peacock (2027)	Season 1, 2003: Cris Judd; Season 2, 2009: Lou Diamond Phillips; Season 3, 2027: Upcoming season	John Lehr (2003); Damien Fahey (2009); Myleene Klass (2009); Maura Higgins (2027); Rob Rausch (2027)
