= Ich bin ein Star – Holt mich hier raus! season 5 =

Ich bin ein Star – Holt mich hier raus!
- Season 5
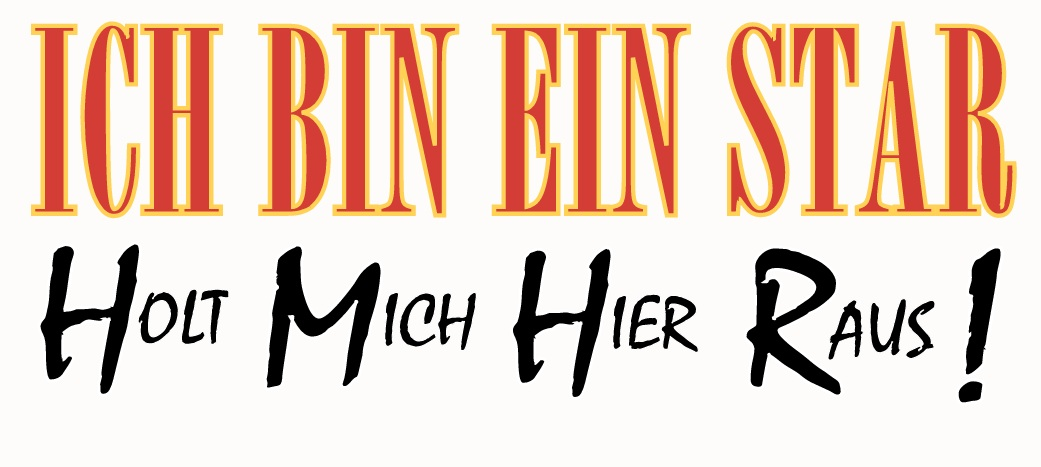
- Logo of "Ich bin ein Star -- Holt mich hier raus!"
- Presented by: Sonja Zietlow; Dirk Bach
- No. of days: 16
- No. of contestants: 11
- Winner: Peer Kusmagk
- Runner-up: Katy Karrenbauer
- No. of episodes: 16

Release
- Original network: RTL
- Original release: 14 January – 29 January 2011

Season chronology
- Next → Season 6

Ich bin ein Star – Holt mich hier raus! returned for its fifth series on 14 January 2011 on RTL. Sonja Zietlow and Dirk Bach returned for their fifth season as hosts. Also the paramedic Bob McCarron alias "Dr. Bob" was back.

On 29 January 2011, the season was won by Peer Kusmagk, with Katy Karrenbauer finishing as the runner-up.

== Celebrities ==
Celebrity	Known for	Status
Peer Kusmagk	Actor, TV presenter	Winner on 29 January 2011
Katy Karrenbauer	Actress, singer, atuhor	Runner-up on 29 January 2011
Thomas Rupprath	Swimming world champion	Third place on 29 January 2011
Jay Khan	Singer, former member of US5	Eliminated 7th on 28 January 2011
Indira Weis	Actress, singer, former member of Bro'Sis	Eliminated 6th on 27 January 2011
Mathieu Carrière	Actor	Eliminated 5th on 26 January 2011
Rainer Langhans	Author and member of Kommune 1	Eliminated 4th on 25 January 2011
Sarah Knappik	Model, contestant on Germany's Next Topmodel	Withdrew on 24 January 2011
Gitta Saxx	Model, TV presenter, playmate	Eliminated 3rd on 23 January 2011
Eva Jacob	Singer, member of Jacob Sisters	Eliminated 2nd on 22 January 2011
Frank Matthée	Wedding planner, host of Frank – Der Weddingplaner	Eliminated 1st on 21 January 2011

== Results and elimination ==
Indicates that the celebrity received the most votes from the public
Indicates that the celebrity received the fewest votes and was eliminated immediately (no bottom two)
Indicates that the celebrity was in the bottom two of the public vote

Daily results per celebrity
	Day 8	Day 9	Day 10	Day 11/12	Day 13	Day 14	Day 15	Day 16 Final	
	Day 8	Day 9	Day 10	Day 11/12	Day 13	Day 14	Day 15	Round 1	Round 2
Peer	9th 4.39%	7th 9.39%	8th 5.43%	1st 28.51%	1st 55.49%	1st 70.00%	1st 66.99%	1st 58.36%	Winner; 69.77%
Katy	4th 11.91%	3rd 13.32%	3rd 11.71%	4th 11.97%	2nd 10.93%	2nd 11.01%	2nd 17.64%	2nd 24.36%	Runner-up; 30.23%
Thomas	5th 8.03%	4th 12.73%	4th 10.05%	6th 8.91%	3rd 9.91%	3rd 8.66%	3rd 10.08%	3rd 17.28%	Eliminated (Day 16)
Jay	2nd 15.56%	2nd 13.33%	1st 33.68%	2nd 17.90%	5th 8.65%	4th 5.40%	4th 5.29%	Eliminated (Day 15)	
Indira	3rd 13.67%	1st 13.65%	2nd 12.09%	3rd 15.80%	4th 8.98%	5th 4.93%	Eliminated (Day 14)		
Mathieu	6th 7.26%	6th 9.55%	6th 7.06%	5th 9.97%	6th 6.04%	Eliminated (Day 13)			
Rainer	7th 5.92%	9th 5.97%	7th 6.21%	7th 6.94%	Eliminated (Day 12)				
Sarah	1st 20.61%	5th 11.19%	5th 9.13%	Withdrew (Day 11)					
Gitta	10th 3.93%	8th 6.02%	9th 4.64%	Eliminated (Day 10)					
Eva	8th 5.58%	10th 4.85%	Eliminated (Day 9)						
Frank	11th 3.14%	Eliminated (Day 8)							
Bottom two	Frank; Gitta	Eva; Rainer	Gitta; Peer	Rainer; Thomas	Jay; Mathieu	None			
Eliminated	Frank; 3.14% to save	Eva; 4.85% to save	Gitta; 4.64% to save	Rainer; 6.94% to save	Mathieu; 6.04% to save	Indira; 4.93% to save	Jay; 5.29% to save	Thomas; 17.28% to win	Katy; 30.23% to win
Eliminated	Frank; 3.14% to save	Eva; 4.85% to save	Gitta; 4.64% to save	Rainer; 6.94% to save	Mathieu; 6.04% to save	Indira; 4.93% to save	Jay; 5.29% to save	Thomas; 17.28% to win	Brigitte; 69.77% to win

== Bushtucker trials ==
The contestants take part in daily trials to earn food. These trials aim to test both physical and mental abilities. The winner is usually determined by the number of stars collected during the trial, with each star representing a meal earned by the winning contestant for their camp mates.

The public voted for who they wanted to face the trial
The contestants decided who did which trial
The trial was compulsory and neither the public nor celebrities decided who took part

Trial number	Air date	Name of trial	Celebrity participation	Number of stars	Notes
1	14 January 2011	"Dschungelzahnarzt" ("Jungle Dentist")	Mathieu; Indira	10/11 stars	
2	15 January 2011	"Friedhof der Kuscheltiere" ("Pet Sematary")	Rainer	11/11 stars	
3	16 January 2011	"Ab durch die Wand" ("Right through the wall")	Sarah	0/11 stars	
4	17 January 2011	"Oktoberfest"	Jay; Sarah	9/11 stars	
5	18 January 2011	"Das Boot des Grauens" ("The boat of horror")	Sarah	9/11 stars	
6	19 January 2011	"Unter Strom" ("Plugged in")	Katy; Sarah	4/11 stars	
7	20 January 2011	"Raus aus den Mulden" ("Out of the troughs")	Sarah	0/11 stars	
8	21 January 2011	"Dschungelabitur" ("Jungle A-levels")	Sarah	4/11 stars	
9	22 January 2011	"Ab durch die Wand" ("Right through the wall")	Peer	5/10 stars	
10	23 January 2011	"Dschungel-Automat" ("Jungle Slot Machine")	Jay; Thomas	7/9 stars	
11	24 January 2011	"Raus aus den Mulden" ("Out of the troughs")	Indira	7/8 stars	
12	25 January 2011	"Am seidenen Faden" ("Hanging by a thread")	Indira; Jay	6/7 stars	
13	26 January 2011	"Die Vögel" ("The birds")	Peer; Thomas	6/6 stars	
14	27 January 2011	"Tarzan und Jane" ("Tarzan and Jane")	Indira; Jay; Katy; Peer; Thomas	1/5 stars	
15	28 January 2011	"Dschungel-Memory" ("Jungle Memory")	Jay; Katy	2/4 stars	
16	29 January 2011	"Das Ziel" ("The goal")	Thomas	5/5 stars	
17	29 January 2011	"Der Weg" ("The way")	Katy	3/5 stars	
18	29 January 2011	"Der Wille" ("The will")	Peer	5/5 stars	
