= Ich bin ein Star – Holt mich hier raus! =

German reality television show

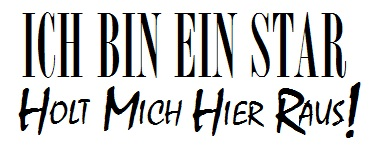
- Show logo
- Also known as: Dschungelcamp
- Genre: Reality television
- Based on: I'm a Celebrity...Get Me Out of Here!
- Presented by: Sonja Zietlow; Dirk Bach; Daniel Hartwich; Jan Köppen
- Country of origin: Germany
- Original language: German
- No. of seasons: 19
- No. of episodes: 252

Production
- Production locations: Dungay, New South Wales, Australia (2004, 2008–2009, 2011–2020, 2023–); Blyde River Canyon, South Africa (2022; 2024 spin-off)
- Running time: 40–210 min.
- Production company: ITV Studios Germany

Original release
- Network: RTL Television
- Release: 9 January 2004 – present

Ich bin ein Star – Holt mich hier raus!, also known colloquially as the Dschungelcamp (Jungle Camp), is a German reality television show, based on the British reality television show I'm a Celebrity...Get Me Out of Here!. The show is produced by ITV Studios Germany and began airing on 9 January 2004 on RTL, and until now have been broadcast 19 seasons.

== History ==
The show is hosted since the first season by Sonja Zietlow and since season 16 together with Jan Köppen, replacing Daniel Hartwich who co-hosted the show since season 7 as he back then replaced the deceased Dirk Bach. The health and wellbeing of the celebrities and crew is looked after by Medic Bob McCarron and his team from EMS.

In summer of 2015, a spin-off show with the title Ich bin ein Star – Lasst mich wieder rein! (I'm a Star - Let me in again!) was aired. Brigitte Nielsen won the show and qualified for the following season of the original show.

In 2021, due the COVID-19 pandemic a new season wasn't aired, but on 15 January 2021 will begin airing a spin-off show with the name Ich bin ein Star – Die große Dschungelshow (I'm a Star - The Great Jungle Show). In 15 live episodes, the first campmate for the 2022 anniversary season, was found among new prominent applicants. Production took place in the Nobeo studios in Hürth-Efferen. In late summer 2024, an all-stars season filmed in South Africa will be broadcast to mark the show's 20th anniversary.

Since 2018, the events of the show have been discussed in the spin-off show Ich bin ein Star – Die Stunde danach (I'm a Star - The Hour After), moderated by Angela Finger-Erben.

=== Filming location ===
Camp location in Australia

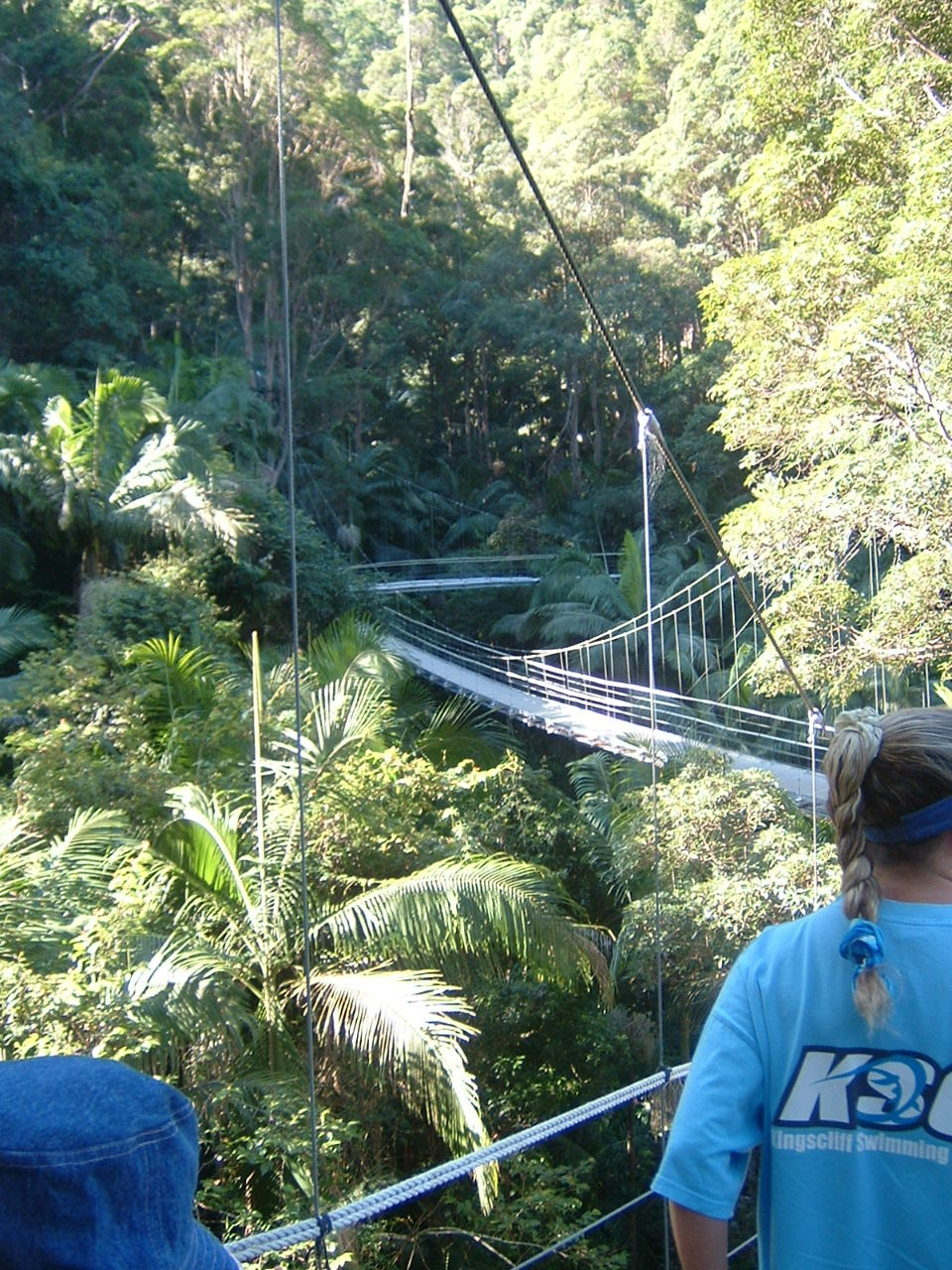
A photo from the location: the bridges that lead to the camp.

Like in the British and the 2003 American versions, also the German version is produced in Dungay, near Murwillumbah, New South Wales, Australia. The leaseholder of the area is ITV plc, formerly Granada Television, which extensively redesigned and built on the previously open area and equipped it with camera and sound technology. During the filming in particular, the area is shielded by military uniformed guards.

== Format ==
The format sees a group of ten to twelve celebrities, who have usually already appeared on television, live for up to two weeks in a so-called jungle camp in Australia under constant surveillance by television cameras. The aim of the participants is to win the favor of the audience and to stay in the camp for as long as possible in order to be crowned as "King or Queen". Since season 13 (2019), the winner has also received a prize of €100,000.

=== Dschungelprüfungen ===
Dschungelprüfungen (Bushtucker trials) are used in the show to allow the contestants to gain food and treats for camp. One contestant, sometimes two or rarely more than one contestant, has to pass a trial every day. These trials usually consist of overcoming scary or repulsive situations, for example by having to prepare smaller animals or parts of animals (e.g. testicles), or eat them dead or alive. In addition, in most exams, contestants are awarded e.g. Maggots, beetles and spiders showered or otherwise confronted with them. Since 2020, RTL and the production company announced that eating trials will no longer contain live bugs.

== Series details ==
=== Main series ===
Order of Place in the following tables are as voted by the viewers.

Series	Days in camp	Start date	End date	Campmates	Finalists			Average viewers (millions)
Series	Days in camp	Start date	End date	Campmates	King/Queen	Second place	Third place	Average viewers (millions)
1	12	9 January 2004	20 January 2004	10	Costa Cordalis	Lisa Fitz	Daniel Küblböck	6.74
2	15	23 October 2004	6 November 2004	10	Désirée Nick	Isabel Varell	Willi Herren	5.54
3	16	11 January 2008	26 January 2008	10	Ross Antony	Michaela Schaffrath	Bata Illic	4.86
4	16	9 January 2009	24 January 2009	10	Ingrid van Bergen	Lorielle London	Nico Schwanz	5.75
5	16	14 January 2011	29 January 2011	11	Peer Kusmagk	Katy Karrenbauer	Thomas Rupprath	7.40
6	16	13 January 2012	28 January 2012	11	Brigitte Nielsen	Kim Gloss	Rocco Stark	6.57
7	16	11 January 2013	26 January 2013	12	Joey Heindle	Olivia Jones	Claudelle Deckert	7.34
8	16	17 January 2014	1 February 2014	11	Melanie Müller	Larissa Marolt	Jochen Bendel	7.87
9	16	16 January 2015	31 January 2015	11	Maren Gilzer	Jörn Schlönvoigt	Tanja Tischewitsch	6.71
10	16	15 January 2016	30 January 2016	12	Menderes Bağcı	Sophia Wollersheim	Thorsten Legat	7.09
11	16	13 January 2017	28 January 2017	12	Marc Terenzi	Hanka Rackwitz	Florian Wess	6.52
12	16	19 January 2018	3 February 2018	12	Jenny Frankhauser	Daniele Negroni	Tina York	5.54
13	16	11 January 2019	26 January 2019	12	Evelyn Burdecki	Felix van Deventer	Peter Orloff	5.24
14	16	10 January 2020	25 January 2020	12	Prince Damien	Sven Ottke	Danni Büchner	5.27
15	16	21 January 2022	5 February 2022	11	Filip Pavlović	Eric Stehfest	Manuel Flickinger	4.06
16	17	13 January 2023	29 January 2023	12	Djamila Rowe	Luigi „Gigi“ Birofio	Lucas Cordalis	3.70
17	17	19 January 2024	4 February 2024	12	Lucy Diakovska	Leyla Lahouar	Tim Kampmann	4.01
18	17	24 January 2025	9 February 2025	12	Lilly Becker	Pierre Sanoussi-Bliss	Alessia Herren	4.42
19		23 January 2026	8 February 2026	12	Gil Ofarim	Samira Yavuz	Hubert Fella	

=== Spin-off shows ===
Entitle	Days in camp	Start date	End date	Campmates	Finalists			Average viewers (millions)
Entitle	Days in camp	Start date	End date	Campmates	King/Queen	Second place	Third place	Average viewers (millions)
Lasst mich wieder rein!	9	31 July 2015	8 August 2015	27	Brigitte Nielsen	Joey Heindle	Michael Wendler	2.25
Die große Dschungelshow	15	15 January 2021	29 January 2021	12	Filip Pavlović	Djamila Rowe	Mike Heiter	2.47
Showdown der Dschungel-Legenden	17	16 August 2024	31 August 2024	13	Georgina Fleur	Kader Loth	Gigi Birofio	2.30
