= Martin Kesici =

German singer-songwriter (born 1973)

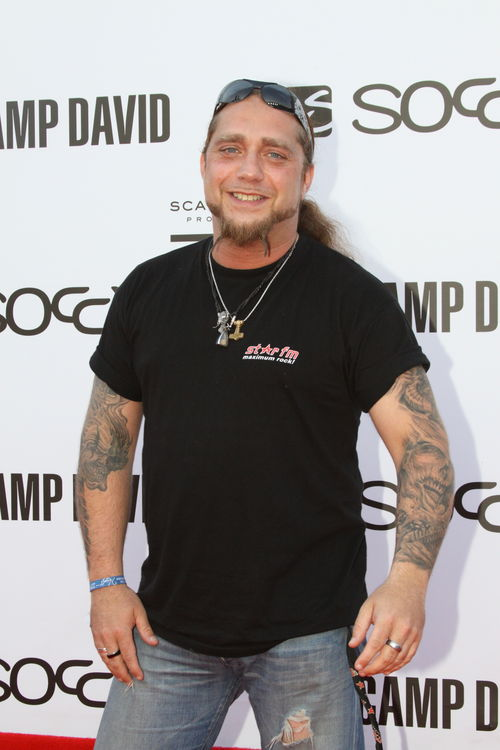
- Martin Kesici (2009)

Background information
- Birth name: Martin Kesici
- Also known as: EmKay
- Born: 29 April 1973 (age 52)
- Origin: Berlin, Germany
- Genres: Hard rock, Heavy metal music, Power Metal, Pop
- Occupations: Singer; songwriter; guitarist; actor; television personality
- Instruments: Vocals; guitar
- Years active: 1994–present
- Labels: Universal Music; Polydor Records; Island Records

Martin Kesici (born 29 April 1973 in Berlin) is a German singer-songwriter and television personality. Kesici rose to prominence after winning the German version of Star Search, a popular US talent contest. His debut single, "Angel of Berlin" reached number one on the German music charts. Also known as Em Kay, he is the lead singer and guitarist for the German rock band, Enrichment. As a solo artist, Kesici released the studio albums "Em Kay" (2003), which reached number two on German music charts and "So What...!? Em Kay II" (2005).

Kesici has also taken part in several reality television shows in Germany, including Ich bin ein Star – Holt mich hier raus! (2012), Adam sucht Eva (2017) and Get the F*ck Out of My House (2019). In addition he has secured an acting role in the indie film titled "Montrak – Meister der Vampire" and released a book. In January 2020, Kesici released a new single following a ten-year hiatus of his solo work.

== Career ==
Kesici is the lead singer and guitarist for the German band Enrichment in which he is also known as EmKay. The band formed in 1994, but went on hiatus due to Kesici's success as a solo artist. Kesici rose to prominence after winning the German version Star Search, which is a popular US talent contest. The show was officially titled "Star Search - Das Duell der Stars von morgen" and was broadcast on the German television network Sat.1 from 5 July 2003. Kesici was one of sixty-four candidates who auditioned for the show. Kesici became the winner of the show in the Over 16's Music Act category. In 2003, Kesici and his fellow cast renamed "Star Search - The Voices", released the single titled "Every Single Star".

After winning, Kesici also released his debut single, "Angel of Berlin", which entered the German music chart at number one. He soon released his debut studio album titled "Em Kay", which reached number two on the German music chart. The album reached number twenty-two in Austria and number thirty in Switzerland. In January 2005, Kesici released the song titled "Leaving You for Me", which he duetted on with Finnish singer Tarja Turunen. Enrichment reformed following a four-year hiatus.

In 2009, Kesici and Markus Grimm (the winner of Deutschland sucht den Superstar) released a book titled "Sex, Drugs & Castingshows". The book detailed their experiences of reality television shows. In the book, Kesici revealed "I never wanted to become a pop star. Or if I did, then I wanted to be a rock star!"

In 2011, Kesici secured his first acting role in an indie film titled "Montrak – Meister der Vampire". In January 2012, Kesici took part in the sixth season of Ich bin ein Star – Holt mich hier raus!, the German version of I'm a Celebrity...Get Me Out of Here!. Kesici withdrew from the competition after eight days. In November 2017, Kesici participated in the RTL reality television series Adam sucht Eva. The show is a dating series where contestants try to find love on an island.

In 2019, Kesici took part in the German version of the reality television series Get the F*ck Out of My House. He lived in a house alongside one-hundred other contestants to try and win a cash prize. He later revealed that he found the show difficult because of the other contestant's noise levels and uncleanliness. On 3 January 2020, Kesici released a new single titled "Diese Welt".

== Personal life ==
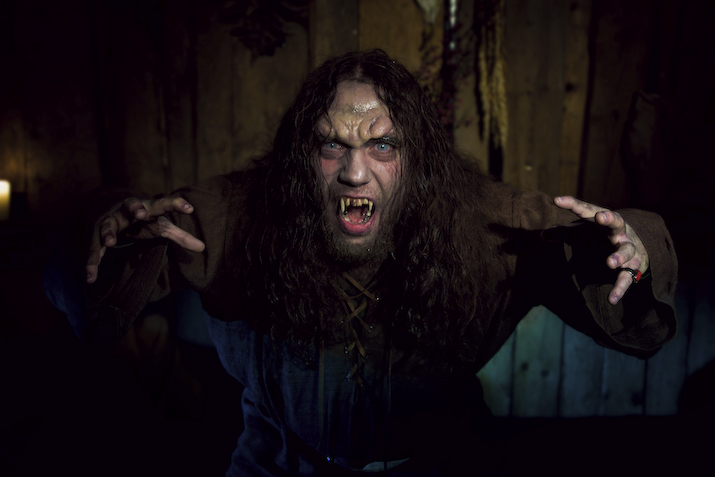
Kesici performing in the film Montrak – Meister der Vampire. (2011)

Kesici was born 29 April 1973 to Turkish father and German mother in Berlin. Aside from his music career, Kesici worked as a pipe fitter. In December 2018, Kesici was involved in a kyak accident whilst training for the television series Pro Sieben Wintergames. He suffered a rotator cuff injury in need of surgery. Kesici was forced to withdraw from the series. In 2019, Kesici announced that he had been diagnosed with depression. He admitted himself into a hospital facility for two months to recover. He attributed his condition to numerous factors including his father's death, injuries he had sustained and the pressure of working in the music industry. In 2020, Kesici revealed that the COVID-19 pandemic had forced him to cancel tour plans that would accompany a new music release. He added that the loss of income left him claiming Hartz IV.

== Discography ==
Albums

- "Em Kay" (15 September 2003)
- "So What...!? Em Kay II" (21 February 2005)

Singles

- "Every Single Star" (2003)
- "Angel of Berlin" (2003)
- "Losing Game" (2003)
- "Hang On" (13 April 2004)
- "Egotrippin'" (20 September 2004)
- "Leaving You For Me" (31 January 2005)
- "My Heart Beats Pain" (3 December 2010)
- "Diese Welt" (3 January 2020)
