= Ich bin ein Star – Holt mich hier raus! season 7 =

Ich bin ein Star – Holt mich hier raus!
- Season 7
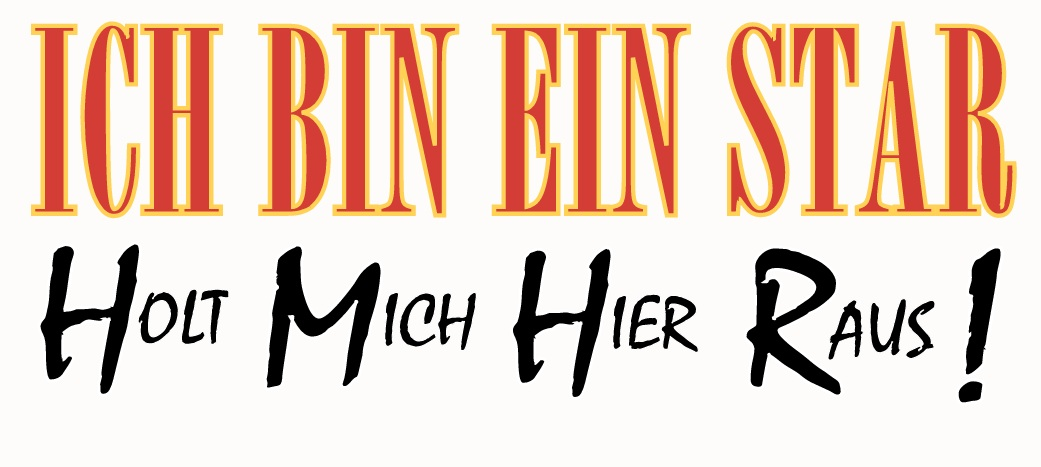
- Logo
- Presented by: Sonja Zietlow; Daniel Hartwich
- No. of days: 16
- No. of housemates: 12
- Winner: Joey Heindle
- Runner-up: Olivia Jones
- No. of episodes: 16

Release
- Original network: RTL Television
- Original release: 11 January – 26 January 2013

Season chronology
- ← Previous season 6 Next → season 8

After the death of co-host Dirk Bach the future of the show was unknown. In October 2012 RTL revealed Daniel Hartwich as new host. Sonja Zietlow remains as host for the show.

In this series there is another show called Ich bin ein Star - Holt mich hier raus! Das Magazin, which picks up the latest action in camp in talk with former campmates. It is aired from Monday to Friday at 7:50 pm (CET).

The series starts on January, 11. For the first time a replacement for one of the participants was sent into the camp two days after the show had already started. Klaus Baumgart replaced Helmut Berger as Berger had to leave the camp because of medical issues..

Also for the first time in history, a group of six celebrities were sent into the jungle, one day before the other five celebrities were sent into the camp. New is a tree house near the camp. Two celebrities can sleep in it, but only by instruction.

== Contestants ==
Place	Celebrity	Famous for being…	Stars	Send into the jungle	Left the show
1	Joey Heindle	Contestant of Deutschland sucht den Superstar	22/29 stars	on 11 January	as "King of the Jungle"
2	Olivia Jones	Drag Queen from Hamburg	18/20 stars	on 10 January	as Runner-Up
3	Claudelle Deckert	Actress, Unter uns	23/31 stars	on 10 January	
4	Fiona Erdmann	Model, contestant of Germany's Next Topmodel	18/27 stars	on 10 January	
5	Patrick Nuo	Swiss singer, former jury member of Deutschland sucht den Superstar	20/25 stars	on 11 January	
6	Georgina Fleur	Contestant of The Bachelor	48/77 stars	on 11 January	
7	Iris Klein	Mother of TV personality Daniela Katzenberger	7/8 stars	on 10 January	
8	Allegra Curtis	Actress, daughter of Tony Curtis	7/11 stars	on 11 January	
9	Arno Funke	Author, former extortionist known as Dagobert	–	on 11 January	
10	Klaus Baumgart	Part of music duo Klaus & Klaus	–	on 13 January	
11	Silva Gonzalez	Singer from Hot Banditoz	6/11 stars	on 10 January	
12	Helmut Berger	Actor	–	on 10 January	because of healthy/security reasons on 12 January

== Bushtucker Trials ==
Date	Contestant	Task name	Translation	Stars
11 January 2013	Fiona Erdmann; Joey Heindle	“Dschungelhochzeit”	Jungle Wedding	8/11 stars
12 January 2013	Georgina Fleur	“Dschungelkloake”	Jungle Cloaca	0/11 stars
13 January 2013	Georgina Fleur; Silva Gonzalez	“Feuchtgebiete”	Wetlands	6/11 stars
14 January 2013	Georgina Fleur	“Hamsterhölle”	Hamster hell	3/11 stars
15 January 2013	Georgina Fleur; Olivia Jones	“Wahrheit oder Pflicht”	Truth or Dare	10/11 stars
16 January 2013	Allegra Curtis; Georgina Fleur; Patrick Nuo	“Abgebrannt”	Burned down	7/11 stars
17 January 2013	Georgina Fleur	“Fluchzeug”	Curse Aircraft	8/11 stars
18 January 2013	Georgina Fleur	"11 Sterne Hotel"	11 Stars Hotel	7/11 stars
19 January 2013	Claudelle Deckert	"Vorzimmer zur Hölle"	Hallway to Hell	8/10 stars
20 January 2013	Joey Heindle	“Dschungelkloake”	Jungle Cloaca	7/9 stars
21 January 2013	Iris Klein; Patrick Nuo	“Känguru des Grauens”	Kangaroo of Horror	7/8 stars
22 January 2013	Claudelle Deckert; Fiona Erdmann	“Dschungelpizzeria”	Jungle Pizzeria	4/7 stars
23 January 2013	Patrick Nuo	“Außer Atem”	Out of Breath	6/6 stars
24 January 2013	Claudelle Deckert; Fiona Erdmann	“Stars vor dem Abgrund”	Stars at the Abyss	3/5 stars
25 January 2013	Claudelle Deckert; Fiona Erdmann; Joey Heindle; Olivia Jones	“Hängepartie”	Stalemate	3/4 stars
26 January 2013	Claudelle Deckert	“Nervenstärke”	Nerve Strength	5/5 stars
26 January 2013	Joey Heindle	“Überwindung”	Overcoming	4/5 stars
26 January 2013	Olivia Jones	“Grenzerfahrung”	Experience of Limit	5/5 stars

Total number of Bushtucker Trials done by each participant:

Allegra	Arno	Claudelle	Fiona	Georgina	Helmut	Iris	Joey	Klaus	Olivia	Patrick	Silva
1	0	5	4	7	0	1	4	0	3	3	1
