= Ich bin ein Star – Holt mich hier raus! season 18 =

Ich bin ein Star – Holt mich hier raus!
- Season 18
- Presented by: Sonja Zietlow; Jan Köppen
- No. of days: 17
- No. of contestants: 12
- No. of episodes: 9

Release
- Original network: RTL
- Original release: 24 January 2025 – present

Season chronology
- ← Previous; Season 17

Ich bin ein Star – Holt mich hier raus! returned for its eighteenth season on 24 January 2025 on RTL. Sonja Zietlow and Jan Köppen returned for their eighteenth and third season as hosts, respectively. Also the paramedic Bob McCarron alias "Dr. Bob" was back.

== Celebrities ==
On 18 December 2024, Maurice Dziwak and Lilly Becker were announced as the first celebrities to be participating on Ich bin ein Star – Holt mich hier raus!. The remaining celebrities were announced on 3 January 2025.

Celebrity	Known for	Status
Lilly Becker	Model & ex-wife of Boris Becker	Winner on 9 February 2025
Pierre Sanoussi-Bliss	Actor, Film director & Screenwriter	Runner-Up on 9 February 2025
Alessia Herren	Daughter of Willi Herren & Television personality	Third place on 9 February 2025
Timur Ülker	Actor	Eliminated 9th on 8 February 2025
Edith Stehfest	Singer & wife of Eric Stehfest	Eliminated 8th on 8 February 2025
Maurice Dziwak	Television personality	Eliminated 7th on 7 February 2025
Anna-Carina Woitschack	Singer & Deutschland sucht den Superstar season 8 contestant	Eliminated 6th on 6 February 2025
Jörg Dahlmann	Football commentator	Eliminated 5th on 5 February 2025
Sam Dylan	Television personality	Eliminated 4th on 4 February 2025
Nina Bott	Actress & Television & presenter	Eliminated 3rd on 2 February 2025
Yeliz Koç	Television personality	Eliminated 2nd on 1 February 2025
Jürgen Hingsen	Decathlete	Eliminated 1st on 31 January 2025

== Results and elimination ==
Indicates that the celebrity received the most votes from the public
Indicates that the celebrity received the fewest votes and was eliminated immediately (no bottom two)
Indicates that the celebrity was in the bottom two of the public vote

Daily results per celebrity
	Day 8	Day 9	Day 10	Day 11	Day 12	Day 13	Day 14	Day 15	Day 16	Day 17 Final		Number of trials
	Day 8	Day 9	Day 10	Day 11	Day 12	Day 13	Day 14	Day 15	Day 16	Round 1	Round 2	Number of trials
Lilly	1st 26.17%	1st 22.13%	1st 24.22%	1st 27.07%	1st 29.65%	1st 30.57%	1st 41.72%	1st 36.33%	1st 44.71%	1st 55.81%	Winner; 61.09%	8
Pierre	3rd 7.94%	2nd 16.37%	6th 9.98%	2nd 12.90%	3rd 10.80%	3rd 11.85%	2nd 12.61%	3rd 13.38%	2nd 23.05%	2nd 34.88%	Runner-Up; 38.91%	5
Alessia	7th 6.71%	6th 5.74%	4th 10.36%	5th 8.79%	6th 7.11%	5th 9.03%	6th 7.32%	5th 10.92%	3rd 12.75%	3rd 9.31%	Eliminated (Day 17)	6
Timur	8th 5.25%	10th 4.96%	7th 7.73%	7th 8.15%	5th 8.46%	2nd 17.34%	4th 11.29%	2nd 17.61%	4th 11.22%	Eliminated (Day 16)		5
Edith	5th 7.18%	8th 5.43%	9th 4.36%	9th 6.47%	4th 9.71%	4th 9.68%	3rd 12.18%	4th 13.31%	5th 8.27%	Eliminated (Day 16)		6
Maurice	6th 7.00%	9th 5.27%	3rd 10.49%	8th 7.98%	2nd 14.07%	7th 7.23%	5th 8.55%	6th 8.45%	Eliminated (Day 15)			4
Anna-Carina	4th 7.84%	5th 7.09%	8th 6.81%	4th 9.47%	8th 6.78%	6th 7.67%	7th 6.33%	Eliminated (Day 14)				4
Jörg	11th 3.30%	3rd 15.20%	2nd 11.46%	3rd 10.70%	7th 7.03%	8th 6.63%	Eliminated (Day 13)					4
Sam	2nd 16.08%	4th 8.61%	5th 10.34%	6th 8.47%	9th 6.39%	Eliminated (Day 12)						9
Nina	9th 5.03%	7th 5.58%	10th 4.25%	Eliminated (Day 10)								2
Yeliz	10th 4.26%	11th 3.44%	Eliminated (Day 9)									3
Jürgen	12th 3.24%	Eliminated (Day 8)										2
Notes	None			1	None					2		
Bottom two	Jörg, Jürgen	Timur, Yeliz	Edith, Nina	Edith, Maurice	Anna-Carina, Sam	Jörg, Maurice	Alessia, Anna-Carina	Alessia, Maurice	None			
Eliminated	Jürgen; Fewest votes to save	Yeliz; Fewest votes to save	Nina; Fewest votes to save	Eviction cancelled	Sam; Fewest votes to save	Jörg; Fewest votes to save	Anna-Carina; Fewest votes to save	Maurice; Fewest votes to save	Edith; Fewest votes to save	Alessia; Fewest votes to win	Pierre; Fewest votes to win	
Eliminated	Jürgen; Fewest votes to save	Yeliz; Fewest votes to save	Nina; Fewest votes to save	Eviction cancelled	Sam; Fewest votes to save	Jörg; Fewest votes to save	Anna-Carina; Fewest votes to save	Maurice; Fewest votes to save	Timur; Fewest votes to save	Alessia; Fewest votes to win	Lilly; Most votes to win	

=== Notes ===
- ^Note 1: On day 10, none of the celebrities were eliminated. It was announced that Edith received the fewest votes but she was saved and the votes counted for the next day.
- ^Note 2: The public voted for who they wanted to win, rather than save.

== Bushtucker trials ==
The contestants take part in daily trials to earn food. These trials aim to test both physical and mental abilities. The winner is usually determined by the number of stars collected during the trial, with each star representing a meal earned by the winning contestant for their camp mates.

The public voted for who they wanted to face the trial
The contestants decided who did which trial
The trial was compulsory and neither the public nor celebrities decided who took part

Trial number	Air date	Name of trial	Celebrity participation	Number of stars	Notes
1	24 January	"Mit allen Wassern gewaschen" ("Washed with all waters")	Jürgen, Lilly, Nina, Pierre, Timur, Yeliz	6/6 stars	N/A
2	24 January	Bungee jumping from a height of 50 meters	Alessia, Anna-Carina, Edith, Jörg, Maurice, Sam	3/6 stars	1
3	24 January	"Bährufs-Bähratung" ("Yuck!-Career counseling")	All celebrities	3/12 stars	2
4	25 January	"Eruptionsstörung" ("Eruption disturbance")	Sam	0/12 stars	3
5	26 January	"Murwillumbah Jones – Jäger der verlorenen Sterne" ("Murwillumbah Jones - Raiders of the Lost Stars")	Sam	0/12 stars	3
6	27 January	"KFZ-WÜRGstatt" ("(Vomit) car repair shop")	Alessia, Sam	0/12 stars	3
7	28 January	"Der Größte Preis von Murwillumbah" ("The Greatest Prize of Murwillumbah")	Alessia, Lilly, Sam	10/12 stars	N/A
8	29 January	"Dschungel-Kiosk" ("Jungle kiosk")	Lilly, Sam, Yeliz	4/12 stars	4
9	30 January	"Keine Uhrsache" "("No (clock-)problem")	Edith, Sam	10/12 stars	N/A
10	31 January	"Karriere-Leider" ("Career-unfortunate")	Sam	0/12 stars	N/A
11	1 February	"Bus- und Bäh-Tag" ("Bus and Yuck Day")	Jörg, Timur	5/11 stars	N/A
12	2 February	"Einkaufs-Strafe" ("Shopping penalty")	Maurice	7/10 stars	N/A
13	3 February	"Tauch Under" ("Dive under")	Anna-Carina, Pierre	2/9 stars	5
14	4 February	"Dinieren oder Blamieren" ("Dining or embarrass")	Lilly, Edith	4/9 stars	N/A
15	5 February	"Murwillumbah Sun"	Jörg, Anna-Carina	0/8 stars	6
16	6 February	"Stock-Schauer" ("Heavy shower")	Maurice, Lilly	0/7 stars	7
17	7 February	"Murwillumbah Sun 2.0"	Edith, Timur	0/6 stars	8
18	8 February	"Creek der Sterne" ("Creek of Stars")	Alessia; Edith; Lilly; Pierre; Timur	5/5 stars	N/A
19	9 February	Appetizer: "Ich schaff das nicht" ("I won't make it")	Alessia	0/5 stars	N/A
20	9 February	Main dish: "Ich will das nicht" ("I don't want this")	Pierre	4/5 stars	N/A
21	9 February	Dessert: "Ich kann das nicht" ("I can't do this")	Lilly	0/5 stars	9

Notes

- ^Note 1: Edith, Jörg and Maurice won one star each.
- ^Note 2: Edith, Jörg and Timur won one star each.
- ^Note 3: The bushtucker trial was canceled by Sam.
- ^Note 4: Lilly won 3 stars and Sam won 1 star.
- ^Note 5: Anna-Carina and Pierre were allowed to change roles after she refused to dive.
- ^Note 6: The bushtucker trial was canceled by Anna-Carina.
- ^Note 7: The bushtucker trial was technichally canceled by Lilly after Maurice repeatedly expressed his desire to cancel the trial.
- ^Note 8: This bushtucker trial was a repetition of the canceled trial two days before.
- ^Note 9: The bushtucker trial was canceled by Lilly.

=== Result table: Who Should go to the Bushtucker Trials? ===
Celebrity	Public vote							Celebrity vote								
Celebrity	24 January	25 January	26 January	27 January	28 January	29 January	30 January	1 February	2 February	3 February	4 February	5 February	6 February	7 February	8 February	9 February
Lilly	6.12%	4.83%	6.21%	11.03%	11.49%	7.09%	5.76%	Jörg	Maurice	Anna-Carina; Lilly	Lilly; Maurice	Jörg; Anna-Carina	Lilly; Maurice	Edith; Timur	No; Nominations	No; Nominations
Pierre	1.68%	1.14%	0.84%	1.20%	1.30%	1.58%	2.80%	Jörg	Pierre	Pierre; Anna-Carina	Lilly; Jörg	Jörg; Maurice	Maurice; Edith	Edith; Timur	No; Nominations	No; Nominations
Alessia	13.22%	15.43%	10.75%	15.22%	7.58%	6.41%	5.87%	Jörg	Maurice	Anna-Carina; Edith	Lilly; Edith	Jörg; Anna-Carina	Lilly; Maurice	Edith; Timur	No; Nominations	No; Nominations
Timur	3.84%	2.88%	2.24%	3.08%	1.89%	3.28%	7.56%	Jörg	Nina	Pierre; Edith	Edith; Jörg	Pierre; Alessia	Edith; Timur	Edith; Timur	No; Nominations	Eliminated (Day 16)
Edith	5.97%	4.32%	3.03%	3.94%	4.06%	14.17%	14.28%	Jörg	Edith	Pierre; Anna-Carina	Lilly; Edith	Timur; Maurice	Timur; Edith	Edith; Timur	No; Nominations	Eliminated (Day 16)
Maurice	4.65%	4.23%	4.82%	7.09%	7.82%	9.05%	12.87%	Jörg	Anna-Carina	Anna-Carina; Pierre	Lilly; Edith	Alessia; Pierre	Lilly; Edith	Timur; Edith	Eliminated (Day 15)	
Anna-Carina	8.33%	5.36%	3.27%	4.12%	3.09%	5.12%	5.51%	Jörg	Anna-Carina	Pierre; Anna-Carina	Jörg; Timur	Maurice; Anna-Carina	Lilly; Maurice	Eliminated (Day 14)		
Jörg	1.90%	1.56%	0.91%	1.78%	0.99%	1.65%	2.49%	Jörg	Jörg	Anna-Carina; Jörg	Lilly; Timur	Anna-Carina; Jörg	Eliminated (Day 13)			
Sam	42.50%	51.58%	62.66%	42.31%	49.42%	36.78%	31.31%	Timur	Pierre	Pierre; Anna-Carina	Lilly; Timur	Eliminated (Day 12)				
Nina	3.35%	2.11%	1.18%	1.87%	1.47%	1.78%	3.52%	Nina	Nina	Eliminated (Day 10)						
Yeliz	5.83%	4.09%	2.67%	6.14%	9.22%	9.78%	8.03%	Yeliz	Eliminated (Day 9)							
Jürgen	2.61%	2.47%	1.42%	2.22%	1.67%	3.41%	Blocked	Eliminated (Day 8)								
Notes	None							1	2	None			3	None		

Notes

- ^Note 1: Jörg was allowed to choose one of the other nominees, because he received the most votes and decided for Timur.
- ^Note 2: Four of the participants received two votes each; in the subsequent ‘play-off’ (among these four), Maurice received five votes.
- ^Note 3: Of the three nominees with four votes, the directors chose Maurice as the first candidate. Of the other two with the same number of votes - Lilly and Edith - Maurice was allowed to choose a companion and chose Lilly.
