= Ich bin ein Star – Holt mich hier raus! season 3 =

Ich bin ein Star – Holt mich hier raus!
- Season 3
- Presented by: Sonja Zietlow and Dirk Bach
- No. of days: 16
- No. of contestants: 10
- Winner: Ross Anthony
- Runner-up: Michaela Schaffrath
- No. of episodes: 16

Release
- Original network: RTL Television
- Original release: 11 January – 26 January 2008

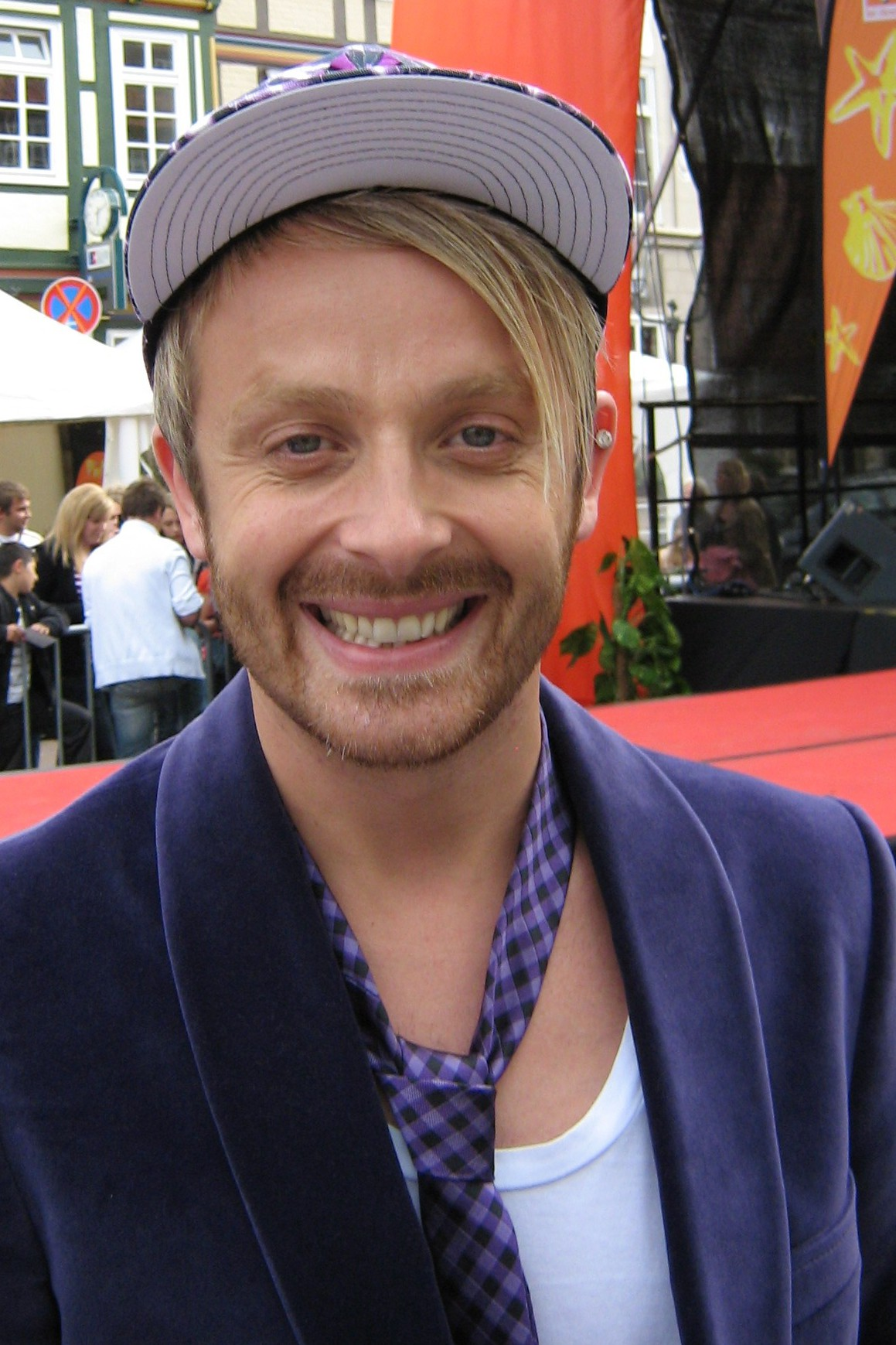
Ross Antony, the "King of the Jungle" of season 3

The third season of Ich bin ein Star – Holt mich hier raus! aired from 11 to 26 January 2008.

== Production ==
First rumors about a return of the show began to spread in 2007. However, RTL Television's entertainment manager, Tom Sänger, denied any plans on a third season because the return to a normal program schedule after the show's end would be difficult to accept for both the television channel and the viewers.

In early November 2007, it was reported that fashion designer Barbara Herzsprung chose to join a group of celebrities that were to visit the Australian rainforest in January 2008. But it was not until 20 November 2007, that RTL Television officially announced the show's return on 11 January 2008.

== Contestants ==
On 19 January, contestant Lisa Bund had to leave the show and was hospitalized because of an acute gastritis which may have been caused by bad hygiene in the camp or during the trials.

On 22 January, DJ Tomekk was evicted from the show. A video which was recorded shortly before the beginning of the show shows him making a Hitler salute and singing "Deutschland über Alles". He insisted he was only joking yet was not allowed to return.

In the last show, on 26 January, the three remaining candidates were Bata Illic, Michaela Schaffrath, and Ross Antony; the latter was chosen by the viewers as this season's "King of the Jungle".

Place	Celebrity	Famous for being...	Stars	Left the show
1	Ross Antony	Former Member of Bro’Sis	24/36 stars	as “King of the Jungle”
2	Michaela Schaffrath	Former Porn Actress	18/26 stars	as Runner-Up
3	Bata Illic	Musician	4/13 stars	
4	Isabel Edvardsson	Professional on Let’s Dance	15/24 stars	
5	Eike Immel	Former Goal Keeper	10/16 stars	
6	Barbara Herzsprung	Fashion Designer	14/17 stars	
7	DJ Tomekk	Musician	17/29 stars	defaulted by RTL Television
8	Björn-Hergen Schimpf	Former Showmaster	14/19 stars	
9	Julia Biedermann	Actress	0/10 stars	
10	Lisa Bund	Former Contestant at Deutschland sucht den Superstar, Season Four	9/10 stars	because of medical problems

== Bushtucker Trials ==
Date	Contestant	Task name	Translation	Stars
11 January 2008	DJ Tomekk	“Land unter”	Land Submerged	5/10 stars
12 January 2008	Lisa Bund	“Dschungelbar”	Jungle Bar	9/10 stars
13 January 2008	Ross Antony	“Zum Anbeißen”	Scrumptious	5/10 stars
14 January 2008	Ross Antony	“Arche Noah”	Noah’s Ark	5/10 stars
15 January 2008	Björn-Hergen Schimpf, Barbara Herzsprung	“Zug des Schreckens”	Train of Horror	8/10 stars
16 January 2008	Eike Immel	“Terrortunnel”	Terror Tunnel	4/10 stars
17 January 2008	DJ Tomekk	“Höllentour”	Hell Tour	6/10 stars
18 January 2008	Isabel Edvardsson	“Dschungel-Wellness”	Jungle Spa	8/10 stars
19 January 2008	Julia Biedermann	“Kakerlakensarg”	Cockroach Coffin	0/10 stars
20 January 2008	Isabel Edvardsson, Michaela Schaffrath, Björn-Hergen Schimpf, DJ Tomekk	“Höllischer Hurrikan”	Infernal Hurricane	6/9 stars
21 January 2008	Bata Illic	“Tempel des Grauens”	Temple of Horror	3/8 stars
22 January 2008	Ross Antony, Barbara Herzsprung, Michaela Schaffrath	“Auf die Folter gespannt”	Kept on Tenterhooks	6/7 stars
23 January 2008	Eike Immel	“Ruhe sanft”	Rest Gently	6/6 stars
24 January 2008	Michaela Schaffrath, Isabel Edvardsson	“Highway to Hell”		1/5 stars
25 January 2008	Ross Antony	“Von der Rolle”	Off the Coil (literally)	3/4 stars
26 January 2008	Michaela Schaffrath	Kampfgeist: “40.000 auf einen Streich”	Fighting Spirit: 40,000 at One Swoop	5/5 stars
26 January 2008	Bata Illic	Abenteuerlust: “Abenteuer Australien”	Adventuresomeness: Adventure Australia	1/5 stars
26 January 2008	Ross Antony	Siegeswille: “Menue Surprise”	Will to Win: Menu Surprise	5/5 stars

Total number of Bushtucker Trials done by each participant to date:

Ross	Isabel	Michaela	DJ Tomekk	Bata	Björn-Hergen	Barbara	Eike	Lisa	Julia
5	3	3	3	2	2	2	2	1	1
