= Barbara Engel =

German fashion designer

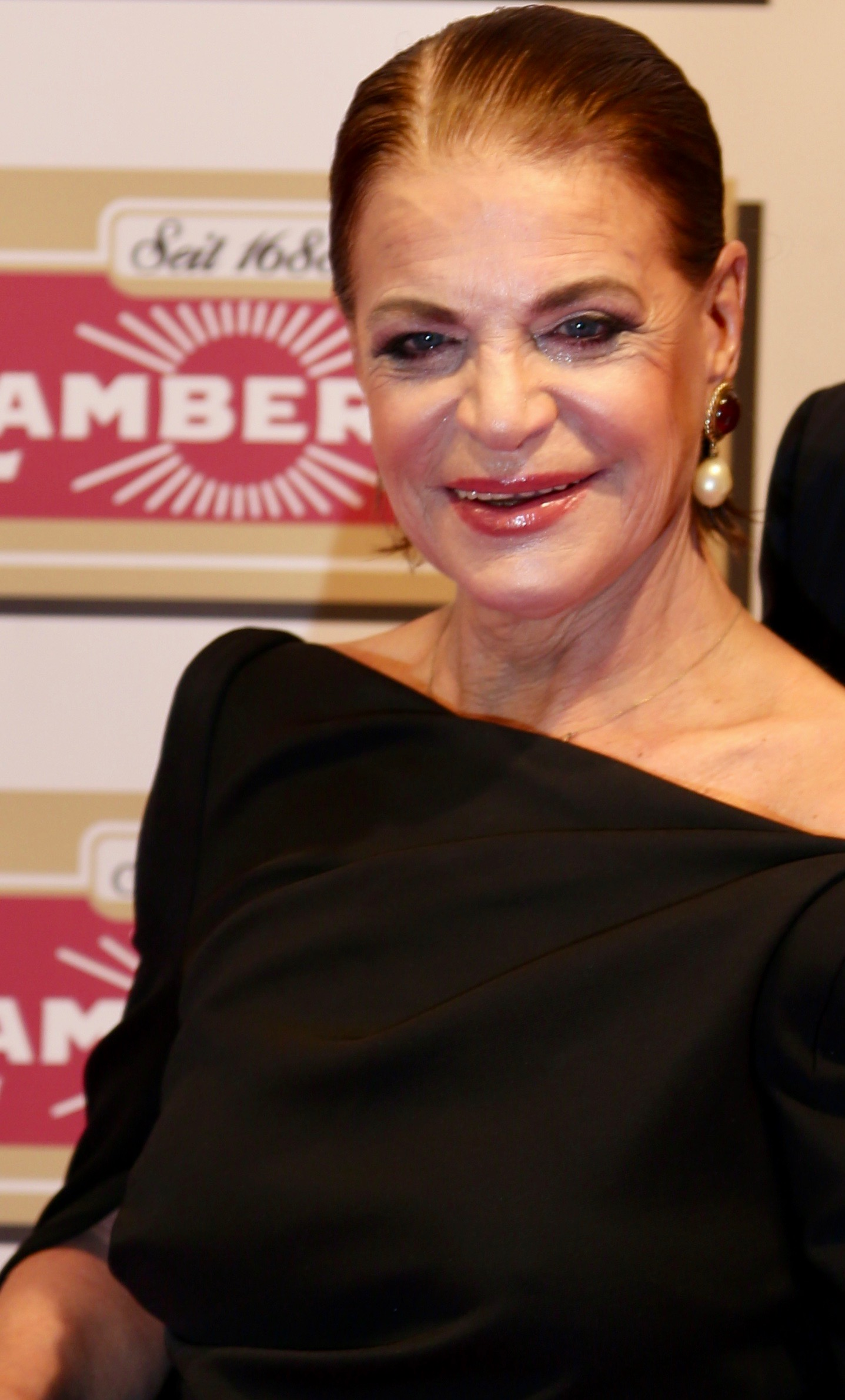
Engel in 2017

Barbara Engel (born 17 September 1952 in Hamburg) is a German fashion designer.

Her father, Werner Engel, was European Rally Champion in 1955. From 1979 to 2008, she was married to actor Bernd Herzsprung. One of her daughters is the actress Hannah Herzsprung.

At 24 years of age, Engel opened up her first Boutique named "L'Uomo". In recent years, she designed T-shirts for the label "Louis und Louisa", and Dirndl fashion for her own label "Von mir!".

In the 1990s, Engel released two collections of fairy tales. In 2008, she was one of the contestants in Ich bin ein Star – Holt mich hier raus!, the German version of the TV show I'm a Celebrity... Get Me Out of Here!.

== Books ==
- Drei Wünsche und andere Märchen. Zusammengestellt von Barbara und Bernd Herzsprung. Der Hör-Verlag, München 1997, ISBN 3-89584-534-5.
- Das Märchenbuch: Heiteres und Herzliches zum Vorlesen. Gesammelt von Barbara und Bernd Herzsprung, mit Illustrationen von Christine Zillich. Ruperti, Starnberg 1997, ISBN 3-923333-12-9.
