= Charlotte Karlinder =

German television presenter and journalist

- Born: 6 February 1975 (age 51); Munkfors, Värmland County, Sweden
- Occupations: television presenter; journalist
- Spouse: Peer Kusmagk (2003-2005)
- Children: 2

Charlotte Karlinder (born 6 February 1975) is a Swedish-born German television presenter and medical journalist.

== Early life ==
Karlinder was born in Sweden, but grew up in Germany. She studied law in Hamburg and cultural studies in Lüneburg.

== Career ==
In 1995, Karlinder began an editorial internship at the Prinz magazine in Hamburg and then worked there as a freelancer until 1997. In 2000, she was a columnist and photographer for the "What's Up Charlotte" party column for the Hamburger Morgenpost. From 2001 to 2003, she was deputy editor-in-chief and fashion editor at Blond Magazin. She was the editor in charge of the medical department "Medical & Health Experts" for numerous publications by Bauer Verlag.

After presenting at DSF (TD1 NBA Basketball Challenge, Maxim TV), MTV Germany (Mission MTV), RTL II ("Big Brother") and co-presenting Absolut Schlegl at ProSieben, she started at Sat.1-Frühstücksfernsehen in July 2004 where she was the female part of the presentation team until 30 December 2005. Since 2016, she has been supplementing the morning magazine with her weekly column "Gesünder mit Karlinder".

== Other work ==
Karlinder is a PETA activist. and wrote a monthly column on peta2.de, the organization's youth campaign. She completed a state examination in emergency medicine and specialized in health and lifestyle medicine.

In 2004, she protested, together with her then husband Peer Kusmagk, at a fur fair in Berlin. The pair were charged with trespassing and vandalism due to a paint bomb attack during a press conference. In retrospect, however, they had to pay only the property damage amounting to €10,000.

== Personal life ==
On 23 May 2003, Karlinder married actor and presenter Peer Kusmagk and, according to Swedish tradition, adopted the double name "Karlinder Kusmagk", which she gave up after the divorce at the end of 2009. She has a daughter and a son.
