= Claudelle Deckert =

German actress (born 1974)

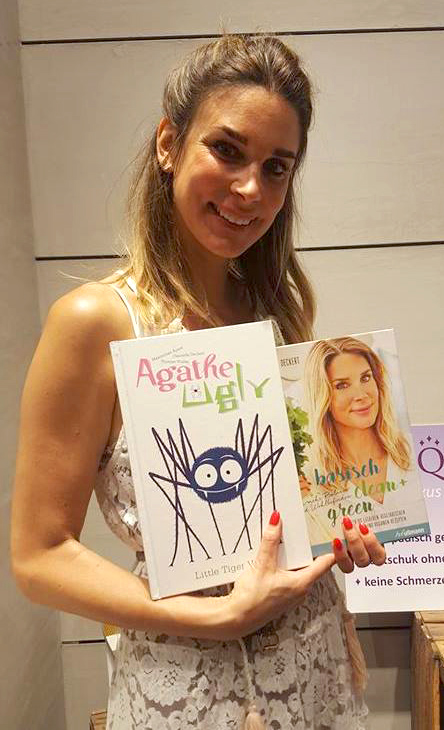
- Born: Claudia Deckert; 1974 (age 51–52); Düsseldorf, West Germany
- Occupation: Actress
- Years active: 1999–present
- Children: 1

Claudelle Deckert (born Claudia Deckert, 1974) is a German actress.

She is part of the main cast of the German soap opera Unter uns since 2001 with a two-year break between 2006 und 2008. In 2013, she appeared on season 7 of the German reality show Ich bin ein Star – Holt mich hier raus! (German version of I'm a Celebrity...Get Me Out of Here!), where she finished third. She also appeared in the German edition of Playboy in the February 2013 issue.

Deckert has a daughter, Romy, with Düsseldorf-based photographer Tom Lemke (d. 2017).

== Filmography ==
=== Television ===
Year	Title	Role	Notes
1999	T.V. Kaiser	Chantal von Klier	German television comedy show, 1 episode
2000	Ritas Welt ("Rita's World")	Nadja	German television comedy show, 1 episode
2001	Kleiner Mann sucht großes Herz	Betty Kamp	German television film
2001–present	Unter uns ("Among Us")	Eva Wagner	German television soap opera
2003	Wilsberg	-	German television series, 1 episode
2005	Drei teuflisch starke Frauen ("Three Strong Women")	Nina Wuttke	German television film
2005-2012	Inga Lindström	Several roles	German television series, 3 episodes
2006	Fünf Sterne ("Five Stars")	-	German television series, 1 episode
2006	Our Charly	Gudrun Faber	German television series, 1 episode
2006	Cologne P.D.	Kerstin Graf	German television series, 1 episode
2007	Rote Rosen ("Red Roses")	Sydney Flickenschildt	German soap opera, 66 episodes
2008	112 – Sie retten dein Leben ("112 Emergency")	Franca Leiniger	German drama series, 1 episode
2010	Countdown – Die Jagd beginnt ("Countdown – The Chase Begins")	Sabine Fiedler	German crime/action series, 1 episode
2012	Der letzte Bulle ("The Last Cop")	-	German crime series, 1 episode

=== Reality TV ===
Year	Title	Role	Notes
2010	Das perfekte Promi-Dinner ("The Perfect Celebrity Dinner")	Herself	German cooking show
2013	Ich bin ein Star – Holt mich hier raus!	Herself	German version of I'm a Celebrity...Get Me Out of Here!; third place
2013	Das perfekte Promi-Dinner	Herself	German cooking show
