= Georgina Fleur =

German reality show participant

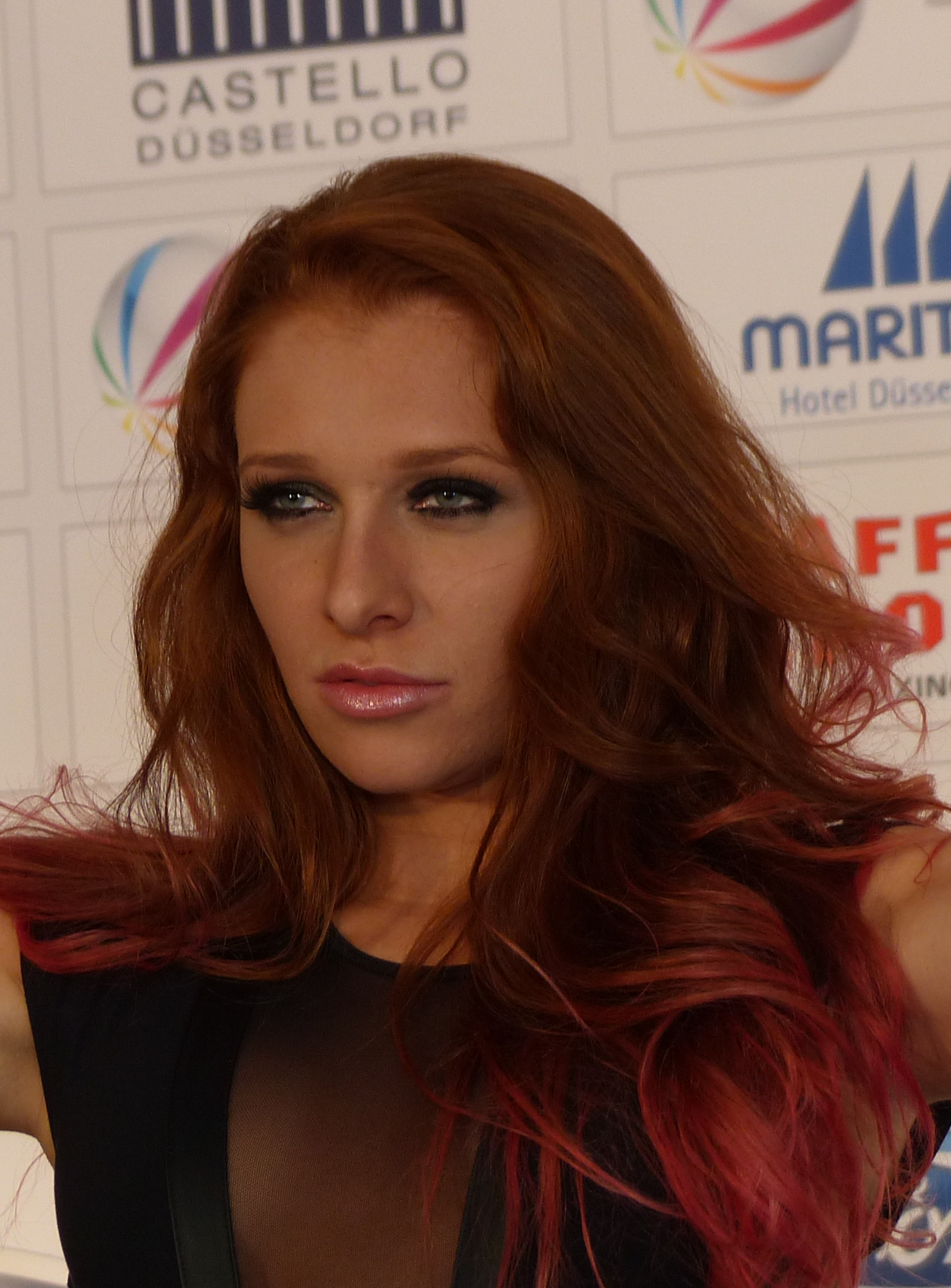
Georgina Fleur at Promiboxen (Celebrity Boxing), 2013

Georgina Fleur (born Georgina Bülowius, April 2, 1990) is a German reality show participant whose popularity in Germany is primarily based on her multiple appearances.

== Biography ==
Studying art history at Heidelberg University, she first appeared on German television on the tabloid news magazine miniseries Teenie Törn (Teen Cruise) in 2011 and Arme reiche Mädchen (Poor Little Rich Girl) on the ProSieben tabloid news magazine Taff. She also appeared on an episode of mieten, kaufen, wohnen (rent, buy, live), a German show very similar to House Hunters.

In January and February 2012, she appeared in the second season in Der Bachelor (the German version of The Bachelor), where she finished in a three-way tie for fifth place.

Based on the popularity of that appearance, in January 2013 she appeared in season 7 of Ich bin ein Star – Holt mich hier raus!, the German version of I'm a Celebrity...Get Me Out of Here!, and finished sixth. Her appearance was notable in the history of the show because she was chosen to participate in the "Dschungelprüfung" (jungle test) trial seven times, breaking the previous record of Sarah Knappik of six times.

Also in January 2013, she released a single titled Je Suis Comme Je Suis (I Am What I Am in French) on Ariola Records (a German subsidiary of Sony Music Entertainment), which was only available as digital download and reached #73 on the German iTunes chart. In the same month, she also appeared on Promi Dinner (Celebrity Dinner, based on Come Dine with Me) on German television.

In March 2013, she got beaten on Promiboxen (a German version of Celebrity Boxing which was revived in Germany in 2012).

With frequent coverage in German tabloids covering her antics, Georgina Fleur has been referred to as the "German Paris Hilton".
