= Ich bin ein Star – Holt mich hier raus! season 8 =

Ich bin ein Star – Holt mich hier raus!
- Season 8
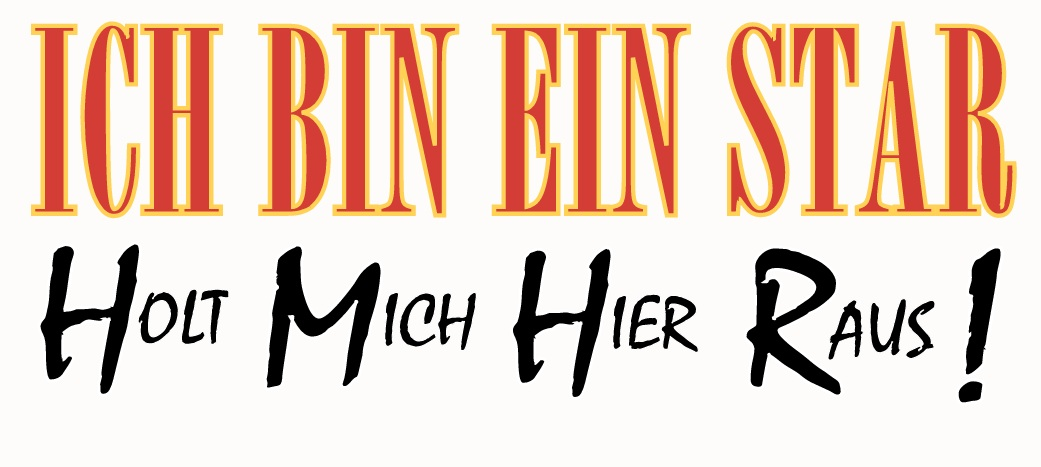
- Logo of "Ich bin ein Star - Holt mich hier raus!"
- Presented by: Sonja Zietlow; Daniel Hartwich
- No. of days: 17
- No. of contestants: 11
- Winner: Melanie Müller
- Runner-up: Larissa Marolt
- No. of episodes: 16

Release
- Original network: RTL Television
- Original release: 17 January – 2 February 2014

Season chronology
- ← Previous; Season 7 Next → Season 9

At the end of the "Big Reunion" episode in season 7, Sonja and Daniel confirmed the return of Ich bin ein Star - Holt mich hier raus! for its eighth season in 2014. Helmut Berger said to Austrian newspaper Kurier, that he would like to go back to the camp in the new series. Season 8's Michael Wendler was the first contestant ever to intend a re-entry into the camp after his voluntary exit on day 4.

== Contestants ==
Place	Celebrity	Famous for being…	Sent into the jungle	Stars	Left the show
1	Melanie Müller	erotic model, contestant on "The Bachelor"	On 17 January	12/25 stars	as Queen of the Jungle
2	Larissa Marolt	winner of Austria's Next Topmodel (cycle 1), 8th in Germany's Next Topmodel (cycle 4)	On 16 January	25/54 stars	as Runner-Up
3	Jochen Bendel	TV host	On 16 January	17/23 stars	eliminated on 1 February
4	Tanja Schumann	comedian, actress	On 17 January	2/6 stars	eliminated on 31 January
5	Winfried Glatzeder	actor, ex-detective on Germany's most successful crime show Tatort	On 16 January	5/5 stars	eliminated on 30 January
6	Marco Angelini	contestant in Deutschland sucht den Superstar (season 8)	On 16 January	7/18 stars	eliminated on 29 January
7	Gabriela "Gabby" De Almeida Rinne	band member of Queensberry	On 17 January	0/4 stars	eliminated on 28 January
8	Mola Adebisi	TV host	On 17 January	4/15 stars	eliminated on 26 January
9	Julian F.M. Stöckel	fashion designer, contestant on Fashion Hero	On 17 January	–	eliminated on 25 January
10	Corinna Drews	actress, model, former wife of Jürgen Drews	On 16 January	–	eliminated on 24 January
11	Michael Wendler	schlager singer	On 16 January	5/6 stars	voluntarily on 20 January

== Bushtucker Trials ==
Date	Contestant	Task name	Translation	Stars
17 January 2014	Larissa Marolt; Michael Wendler	“Schocktherapie”	Shock Treatment	(Marolt, Wendler, together)
18 January 2014	Larissa Marolt	“Höhlenmensch”	Cave Man	4/11 stars
19 January 2014	Larissa Marolt	“Schritte in den Abgrund”	Steps into the Abyss	4/11 stars
20 January 2014	Larissa Marolt	“Fahr zur Hölle”	Drive to Hell	3/11 stars
21 January 2014	Larissa Marolt; Melanie Müller	“Weinkeller des Grauens”	Wine Cellar of Horror	(Marolt, Müller)
22 January 2014	Larissa Marolt; Winfried Glatzeder	“Harte Zeiten”	Hard Times	(Marolt, Glatzeder)
23 January 2014	Larissa Marolt; Mola Adebisi	“Hohe Erwartungen”	High Expectations	(Marolt, Adebisi)
24 January 2014	Larissa Marolt; Mola Adebisi	“Spinnenschock”	Spider Shock	(prematurely ended by Adebisi)
25 January 2014	Gabby De Almeida Rinne; Jochen Bendel; Marco Angelini; Melanie Müller	“Der Preis ist Reis”	The Price is Rice	(Rinne, Bendel, Angelini, Müller, Together)
26 January 2014	Marco Angelini	“In die Enge getrieben”	Cornered	5/8 stars
27 January 2014	Jochen Bendel	“Kakerlakensarg”	Cockroach Coffin	7/7 stars
28 January 2014	Melanie Müller; Marco Angelini	“All you can eat”	—	1/7 stars
29 January 2014	Jochen Bendel	“Rattenhöhle”	Rat Cave	4/6 stars
30 January 2014	Melanie Müller; Tanja Schumann	“Wackelkandidaten”	Wobbly Candidates	1/5 stars
31 January 2014	Melanie Müller; Tanja Schumann; Larissa Marolt; Jochen Bendel	“Kein leichtes Spiel”	No easy Game	3/4 stars
1 February 2014	Jochen Bendel	“Konzentration”	Concentration	5/5 stars
1 February 2014	Larissa Marolt	“Selbstvertrauen”	Self-Confidence	5/5 stars
1 February 2014	Melanie Müller	“Nervenstärke”	Strength of Nerves	5/5 stars

Total number of Bushtucker Trials done by each participant:

Larissa	Melanie	Jochen	Marco	Tanja	Mola	Winfried	Gabby	Michael	Julian	Corinna
10	6	5	3	2	2	1	1	1	0	0
