= Ich bin ein Star – Holt mich hier raus! season 6 =

Ich bin ein Star – Holt mich hier raus!
- Season 6
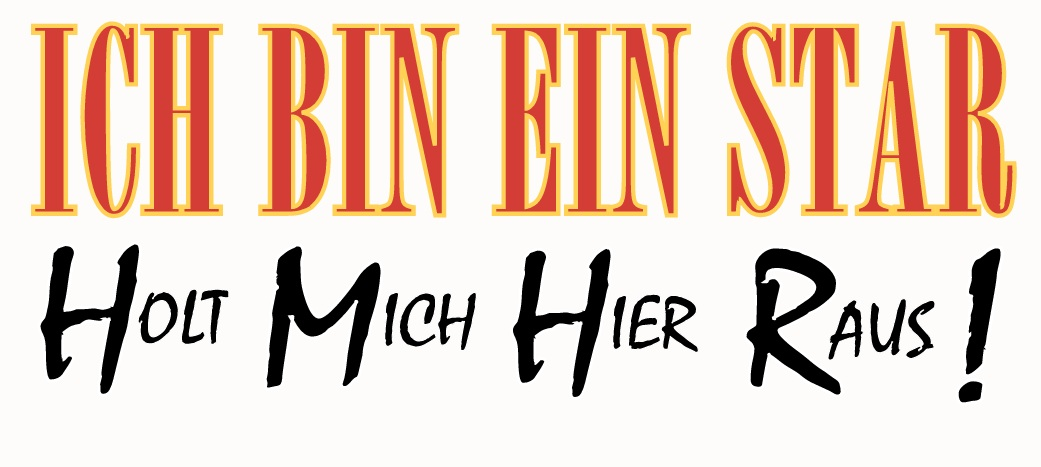
- Logo of "Ich bin ein Star -- Holt mich hier raus!"
- Presented by: Sonja Zietlow; Dirk Bach
- No. of days: 16
- No. of contestants: 11
- Winner: Brigitte Nielsen
- Runner-up: Kim Gloss
- No. of episodes: 16

Release
- Original network: RTL
- Original release: 13 January – 28 January 2012

Season chronology
- Next → Season 7

Ich bin ein Star – Holt mich hier raus! returned for its sixth series on 13 January 2012 on RTL. Sonja Zietlow and Dirk Bach returned for their sixth season as hosts. Also the paramedic Bob McCarron alias "Dr. Bob" was back.

On 28 January 2012, the season was won by Brigitte Nielsen, with Kim Gloss finishing as the runner-up.

== Celebrities ==
Celebrity	Known for	Status
Brigitte Nielsen	Actress, model	Winner on 28 January 2012
Kim Gloss	Singer, candidate in Deutschland sucht den Superstar	Runner-up on 28 January 2012
Rocco Stark	Actor, son of Uwe Ochsenknecht	Third place on 28 January 2012
Micaela Schäfer	Erotic model and candidate on Germany's Next Top Model	Eliminated 7th on 27 January 2012
Vincent Raven	Magician and paragnostic, winner of season 1 The next Uri Geller	Eliminated 6th on 26 January 2012
Aílton	Former professional soccer player	Eliminated 5th on 25 January 2012
Radost Bokel	Actress	Eliminated 4th on 24 January 2012
Marlene „Jazzy“ Tackenberg	Singer, former member of the band Tic Tac Toe	Eliminated 3rd on 23 January 2012
Ramona Leiss	TV Presenter	Eliminated 2nd on 21 January 2012
Daniel Lopes	Singer, candidate in Deutschland sucht den Superstar and Das Supertalent	Eliminated 1st on 20 January 2012
Martin Kesici	Singer and radio host, season 1 winner Star Search	Withdrew on 20 January 2012

== Results and elimination ==
Indicates that the celebrity received the most votes from the public
Indicates that the celebrity received the fewest votes and was eliminated immediately (no bottom two)
Indicates that the celebrity was in the bottom two of the public vote

Daily results per celebrity
	Day 8	Day 9	Day 10/11	Day 12	Day 13	Day 14	Day 15	Day 16 Final	
	Day 8	Day 9	Day 10/11	Day 12	Day 13	Day 14	Day 15	Round 1	Round 2
Brigitte	1st 38.50%	1st 35.80%	1st 34.98%	1st 35.77%	1st 41.97%	1st 54.70%	1st 36.63%	1st 49.65%	Winner; 56.73%
Kim	4th 7.68%	3rd 11.51%	4th 8.70%	2nd 19.53%	3rd 13.70%	3rd 12.00%	2nd 30.48%	2nd 33.65%	Runner-up; 43.27%
Rocco	2nd 14.15%	2nd 22.98%	2nd 24.17%	3rd 19.42%	2nd 18.78%	2nd 15.71%	3rd 16.88%	3rd 16.70%	Eliminated (Day 16)
Micaela	3rd 8.12%	5th 6.10%	3rd 11.68%	4th 10.45%	4th 11.32%	4th 9.53%	4th 16.59%	Eliminated (Day 15)	
Vincent	7th 5.38%	6th 5.09%	6th 5.98%	5th 5.25%	5th 7.33%	5th 8.06%	Eliminated (Day 14)		
Aílton	6th 6.22%	4th 8.78%	5th 6.18%	6th 5.22%	6th 6.90%	Eliminated (Day 13)			
Radost	5th 6.87%	7th 3.90%	7th 5.46%	7th 4.36%	Eliminated (Day 12)				
Jazzy	9th 4.18%	8th 3.54%	8th 2.85%	Eliminated (Day 11)					
Ramona	8th 5.11%	9th 2.30%	Eliminated (Day 9)						
Daniel	10th 3.79%	Eliminated (Day 8)							
Martin	Withdrew (Day 8)								
Bottom two	Daniel; Jazzy	Ramona; Jazzy	Radost; Jazzy	Aílton; Radost	Aílton; Vincent	None			
Eliminated	Daniel; 3.79% to save	Ramona; 2.30% to save	Jazzy; 2.85% to save	Radost; 4.36% to save	Aílton; 6.90% to save	Vincent; 8.06% to save	Micaela; 16.59% to save	Rocco; 16.70% to win	Kim; 43.27% to win
Eliminated	Daniel; 3.79% to save	Ramona; 2.30% to save	Jazzy; 2.85% to save	Radost; 4.36% to save	Aílton; 6.90% to save	Vincent; 8.06% to save	Micaela; 16.59% to save	Rocco; 16.70% to win	Brigitte; 56.73% to win
