= Die Fussbroichs =

- Starring: Fred (Friedrich) Fussbroich (born 16 September 1940; died 18 October 2022); Annem(ar)ie Fussbroich (born September 1947 in Bergisch Gladbach); Frank Fussbroich (born 17 June 1968)
- Country of origin: Germany
- No. of episodes: 100

Original release
- Network: WDR Fernsehen
- Release: 13 February 1990 – 26 December 2003

Die Fussbroichs (German pronunciation: [ˈdiː ˈfuːsbʁɔʏçs]) is a German television series by WDR Fernsehen. It was the offspring of a German documentary Die Fussbroichs - Ein Kinderzimmer 1979 by Westdeutsches Fernsehen, former name of WDR Fernsehen, shown on 19 August 1979. The pilot Die Fussbroichs — Eine Kölner Arbeiterfamilie - a documentary of 85 minutes — was shown on 13 February 1990. The television series launched in 1991, the first episode was shown on 22 December 1991, and ended in 2002. The 100th and last — former unbroadcast - episode Check-up was shown on 26 December 2003.

== Literature ==
- Ute Diehl: Fussbroichs : die einzig wahre Familiengeschichte, Wienand, Köln, 1994, ISBN 978-3-87909-395-3 (German)
- Eike Wenzel: Ballonseide und Schrankwand: Privatheit und Intimität bei den Fussbroichs und in der Docu-Soap., In: Ulrike Bergermann, Hartmut Winkler (Hrsg.): TV-Trash. The TV-show I love to hate. Schüren 2000 (Schriftenreihe der Gesellschaft für Film- und Fernsehwissenschaft (GFF) 9), S. 71–81 (German)

== Awards ==
- 1992: Grimme-Preis Bronze for director Ute Diehl.

== See also ==
- List of German television series
