= Ich bin ein Star – Holt mich hier raus! season 1 =

Ich bin ein Star – Holt mich hier raus!
- Season 1
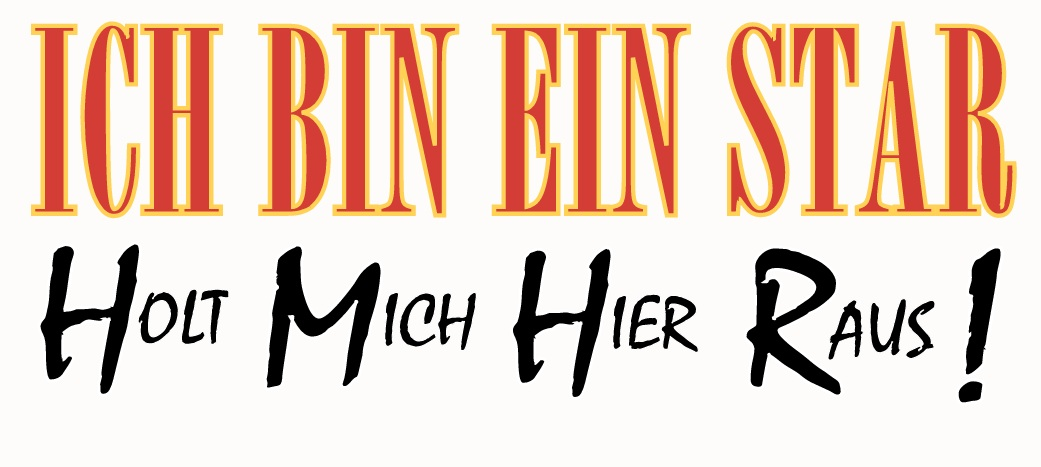
- Presented by: Sonja Zietlow and Dirk Bach
- No. of days: 12
- No. of contestants: 10
- Winner: Costa Cordalis
- Runner-up: Lisa Fitz
- No. of episodes: 12

Release
- Original network: RTL Television
- Original release: 9 January – 20 January 2004

The first season of the German version of the reality show I'm a Celebrity...Get Me Out of Here! began on 9 January 2004 and ended on 20 January 2004. 12 contestants were announced to compete.

== Contestants ==
Place	Contestant	Famous for being...	Left the Jungle
1	Costa Cordalis	Schlager singer	Winner
2	Lisa Fitz	actress, singer	Runner-Up
3	Daniel Küblböck	singer, Deutschland sucht den Superstar (season 1) contestant	Third place
4	Caroline Beil	presenter, actress	Eliminated 7th
5	Werner Böhm	musician	Eliminated 6th
6	Mariella Ahrens	actress	Eliminated 5th
7	Susan Stahnke	presenter, news broadcaster	Eliminated 4th
8	Antonia Langsdorf	TV astrologian, presenter	Eliminated 3rd
9	Carlo Thränhardt	high jumper	Eliminated 2nd
10	Dustin Semmelrogge	actor	Withdrew

== Bushtucker Trials ==
Date	Contestant	Task name	Translation	Stars
9 January 2004	Costa Cordalis	“Schlangengrube”	Snakepit	8/10 stars
10 January 2004	Daniel Küblböck	“Die Teufelsgrube”	The devil's pit	9/9 stars
11 January 2004	Daniel Küblböck	“Kakerlakensarg”	Cockroaches coffin	9/9 stars
12 January 2004	Daniel Küblböck	“Terroraquarium”	Terror aquarium	0/9 stars
13 January 2004	Caroline Beil	“Hack-Attacke”	Hack attack	4/9 stars
14 January 2004	Caroline Beil	“Kaffeeklatsch in der Hölle”	Coffee gossip in Hell	6/9 stars
15 January 2004	Costa Cordalis	“Sternenfänger”	Stars catcher	8/8 stars
16 January 2014	Lisa Fitz	“Dschungel-Houdini”	Jungle Houdini	7/7 stars
17 January 2004	Werner Böhm	“Tunnel des Grauens”	Tunnel of horror	5/6 stars
18 January 2004	Daniel Küblböck	“Von der Rolle”	From the Roll	2/5 stars
19 January 2004	Caroline Beil; Lisa Fitz	“Höllische Bootsfahrt”	Hellish boat trip	1/5 stars
20 January 2004	Lisa Fitz	“Dschungelfreude”	Jungle joy	5/5 stars
20 January 2004	Daniel Küblböck	“Hosen voll”	Fed up	5/5 stars
20 January 2004	Costa Cordalis	“Spinnennetz”	Spider web	5/5 stars
