= Michaela Schaffrath =

German television actress and former pornographic actress

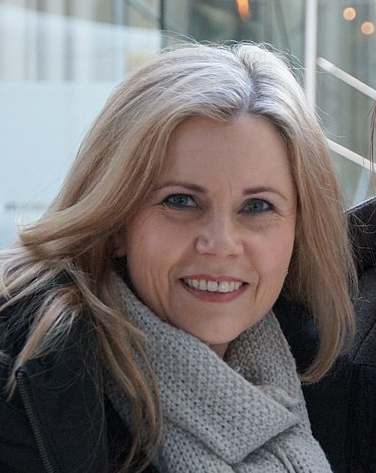
- Schaffrath in 2016
- Born: Michaela Jänke; 6 December 1970 (age 55); Eschweiler, West Germany
- Other name: Gina Wild
- Occupations: Television actress; pornographic actress
- Height: 5 ft 3 in (1.60 m)
- Spouses: Axel Schaffrath (m. 1990; div. 2005); Michael Wanhoff (m. 2009; sep. 2013)
- Website: michaela-schaffrath.de

Michaela Schaffrath (née Jänke; born 6 December 1970) is a German television actress and former pornographic actress.

A former nurse, she got started in the adult film industry after she posed nude for Coupé, a German adult magazine. She gained international attention during her career as a pornographic actress under the stage name Gina Wild. She won two Venus Awards, for Best New Starlet in 1999 and Best German Actress in 2000.

In 2000, Schaffrath retired from pornography and moved into mainstream acting, and has since appeared in numerous German television series, such as TV total, In aller Freundschaft, and Wer wird Millionär?. In 2005, she put the rights to her stage name and the brand 'Gina Wild' up for sale, in an attempt to shed her porn star past.

She is managed by her former husband, and as of 2009, lived in both Frankfurt and Hamburg.
