= Joey Heindle =

German singer

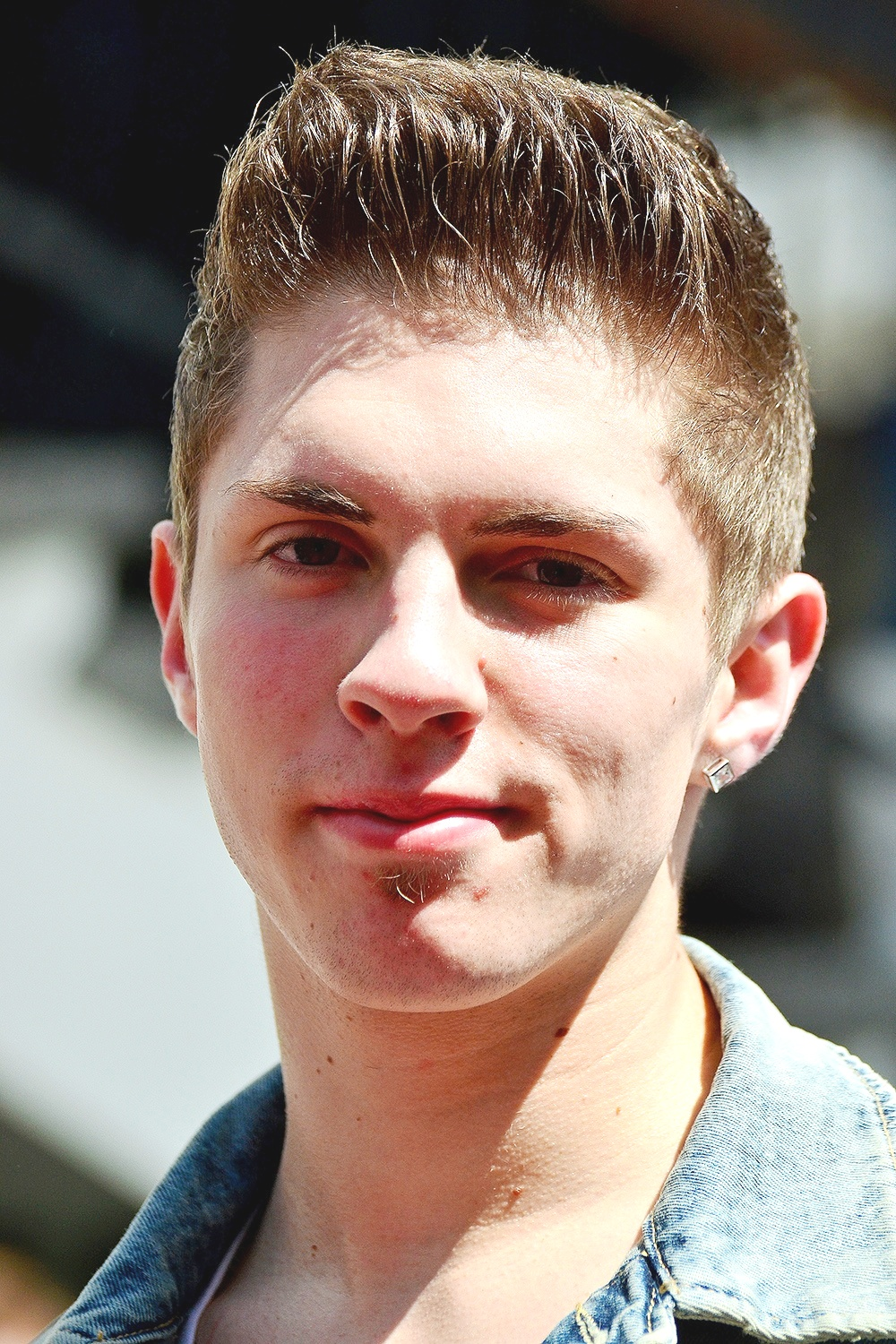

Background information
- Born: 14 May 1993 (age 31); Munich, Germany
- Occupation: Singer
- Instruments: Vocals
- Years active: 2012–present

Joey Heindle (born 14 May 1993 in Munich) is a German singer. He is best known for winning the seventh season of the game show Ich bin ein Star – Holt mich hier raus! (2013) and finishing in 5th place in season 9 of Deutschland sucht den Superstar (2012), despite universally negative reviews from the jury each week.

== Biography ==
=== Early life ===
Joey Heindle was born on 14 May 1993 in Munich, Bavaria. He currently lives in Freising, Bavaria. He has 5 siblings. He has trained as an assistant chef and has further training as a chef. He had to cancel training due to a hand injury. He can play the guitar. He has sung at birthday parties. His favourite singers are Elton John and Xavier Naidoo.

=== DSDS ===
He went shirtless for his Top 8 performance. He felt uncomfortable going shirtless. Joey stated (about being shirtless) "Actually, I did not want that, but did that because the director wanted." Joey called DSDS jury member Dieter Bohlen a "pussy" for the negative criticism he has given him. After the show, Joey stated "Dieter was a pussy. He just left and did not listen till the end. That just simply sucks. No one on earth would do that in a talent show. This is a huge insult". Joey also stated that his relationship in the long-term won't suffer because of this and he will forgive Dieter at some point. He was eliminated in the Top 5. Though he received negative feedback in the mottoshows, he ranked high in the public voting until his elimination.

=== Post-DSDS ===
Within days of being eliminated from DSDS, Heindle got a recording contract with music producer Marco Delgardo. Heindle had to be taken to a hospital by ambulance after funny movement and falling on his bed. He was diagnosed with a pinched nerve. Heindle is booked until August 2013. Heindle participated in Ich bin ein Star – Holt mich hier raus! and won.

== Performances ==
Show (Original Airdate)	Song (Artist)	Percentage of calls
Top 16 (25 February 2012)	"Here Without You" (3 Doors Down)	
Top 10 (3 March 2012)	"Hey, Soul Sister" (Train)	
Top 9 (10 March 2012)	"Crying at the Discoteque" (Alcazar)	
Top 8 (17 March 2012)	"Der Weg" (Herbert Grönemeyer)	
Top 7 (24 March 2012)	"Love Is in the Air" (John Paul Young)	
Top 6 (31 March 2012)	"Bitte hör nicht auf zu träumen" (Xavier Naidoo)	
Top 6 (31 March 2012)	"Hero" (Enrique Iglesias) (duet with Luca Hänni)	
Top 5 (7 April 2012)	"Grenade" (Bruno Mars)	
Top 5 (7 April 2012)	"Behind Blue Eyes" (Limp Bizkit)	

== Discography ==
=== Studio albums ===
List of albums, with selected chart positions
Title	Album details	Peak chart positions	
Title	Album details	GER	AUT
Jeder Tag zählt	Released: 1 February 2013; Label: Edel Records; Format: CD, Music download	95	65

=== Singles ===
List of singles, with selected chart positions and certifications
Title	Year	Peak chart positions		Album
Title	Year	GER	AUT	Album
"Die ganze Welt dreht sich um dich"	2012	94	—	Jeder Tag zählt
"Hol’ mich raus!"	2013	—	—	Jeder Tag zählt
"—" denotes a title that was not released or did not chart in that territory.
