= Dungay =

Town in New South Wales, Australia

- Town
- Coordinates: 28°17′S 153°22′E
- Country: Australia
- State: New South Wales
- LGA: Tweed Shire

Government
  - State electorate: Tweed
  - Federal division: Richmond

Population
  - Total: 316 (2011 census)
- Time zone: UTC+10 (AEST)
  - Summer (DST): UTC+11 (AEDT)
- Postcode: 2484

Dungay is a town in north-eastern New South Wales, Australia, in the Tweed Shire.

The Ngandowal and Minyungbal speaking people of the Bundjalung people are the traditional owners of the Tweed region, including Dungay, and the surrounding areas.

== Demographics ==
In the 2011 census, Dungay recorded a population of 316 people, 49.1% female and 50.9% male.

The median age of the Dungay population was 49 years, 12 years above the national median of 37.

81.5% of people living in Dungay were born in Australia. The other top responses for country of birth were New Zealand 1.9%, England 0.9%, India 0.9%, Germany 0.9%, Czech Republic 0.9%.

91.2% of people spoke only English at home; the next most common languages were 1.3% Italian, 8.5% other languages.

== In popular culture ==
The area is used for the filming of the British reality series, I'm A Celebrity... Get Me Out of Here!, and has been since 2003 except for 2020 and 2021. Versions of the show for other countries are also produced in the area. The 2020 edition of the UK was not produced in Dungay given COVID-19 pandemic, and the resulting level 4 travel ban for Australia. Conversely, the 2021 and 2022 editions of the Australian version of the series were produced in Dungay - as travel restrictions prevented the production travelling to the normal South African location.
