= Melanie Müller =

German television presenter and singer (born 1988)

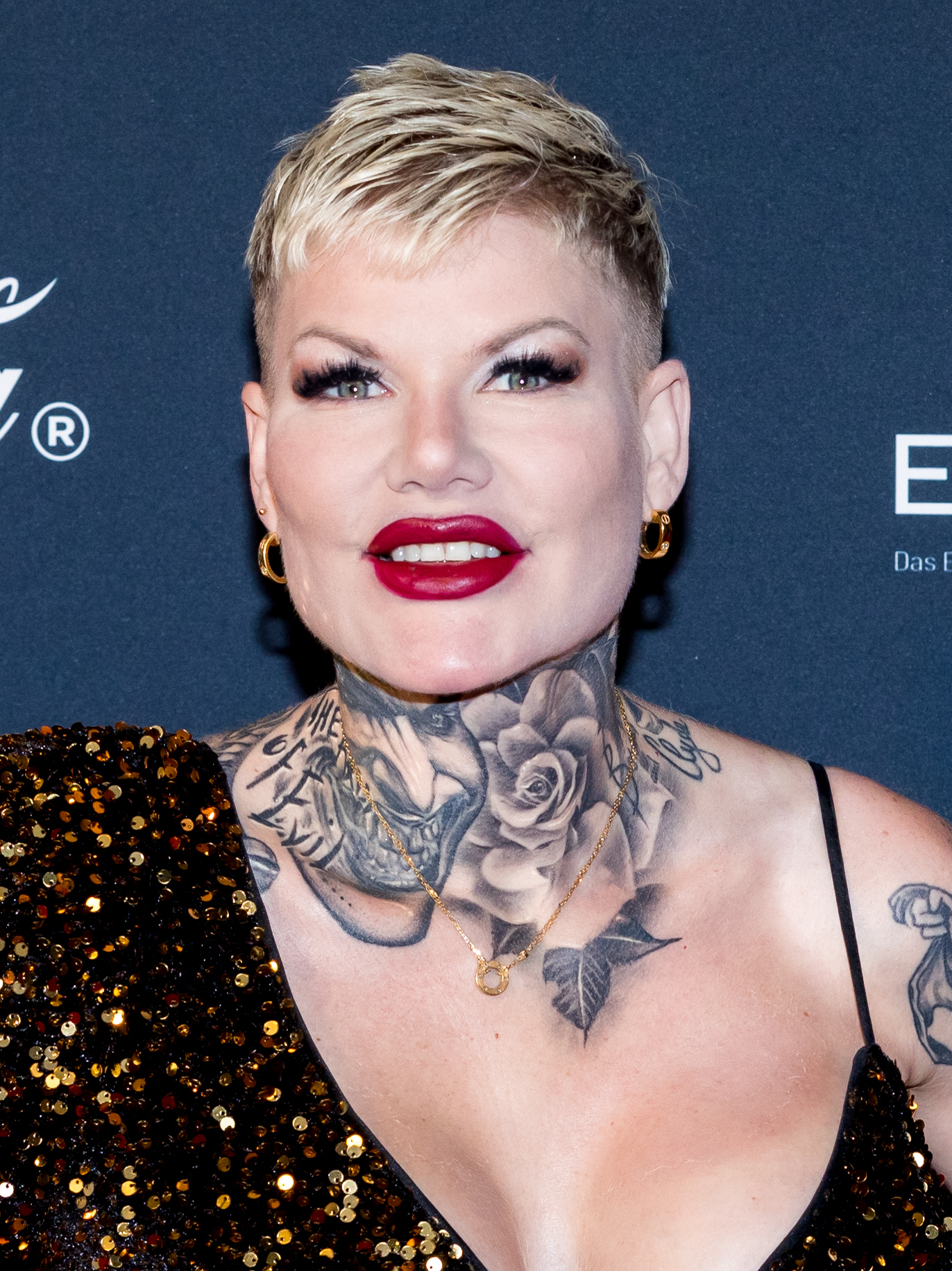
- Müller in 2024
- Born: 10 June 1988 (age 38); Oschatz, Leipzig, East Germany
- Occupations: Television personality; singer
- Website: melanie-m.de

Melanie "Melli" Müller (born 10 June 1988) is a German reality television personality, schlager singer and former pornographic actress.

== Early life ==
From 2005 to 2009, Müller, who was born in Oschatz, trained as a restaurant specialist and a bartender. Discovered by photographer Andreas Koll, she began working as an erotic model in 2010.

== Career ==
In 2012, Müller had a brief career in pornographic films with the stage name Scarlet Young. In 2013, she was a contestant on the third season of Der Bachelor, the German version of The Bachelor, where she was a finalist. In April 2013, she released the song "Ob Mann, ob Frau – ich nehm's nicht so genau". In June 2013, she took part on the TV show Pool Champions. The same month, she appeared in the Taff series Projekt Paradies: Promi-Heilfasten. In the summer of 2013, she made a mini musical tour in Mallorca.

In January 2014, Müller won the RTL reality show Ich bin ein Star – Holt mich hier raus! In April the same year, she released "Auf geht's, Deutschland schießt ein Tor!" ("Let's go, Germany score!"), a song for the 2014 FIFA World Cup.

Since 2013, she has mainly been active as a schlager singer.

Outside of her entertainment career, Müller is an entrepreneur; she owns two online store websites, Lustshoppen24 and Königsklasse, and opened a fashion boutique in the center of Leipzig in 2013, which closed after a few months.

Beginning in September 2022, first video recordings were published showing right-wing extremism slogans in the audience at one of her performances in Leipzig. Müller subsequently distanced herself from the people in her audience and from right-wing ideas. Later, more footage of the same performance revealed her raising the right arm, apparently showing the Hitler salute. As a result, the Saxon state police is investigating; Nazi signs and symbols, including the Hitler salute, are illegal in Germany. Müller said these hand movements are not from a right-wing extremist background, but a part of her show since her first stage performances. The indictment was issued in May 2023. Later that year, she appeared at a boxing event with strong links to the far-right scene. Müller again distanced herself from the right-wing extremist scene.
