= Peer Kusmagk =

German actor and television host (born 1975)

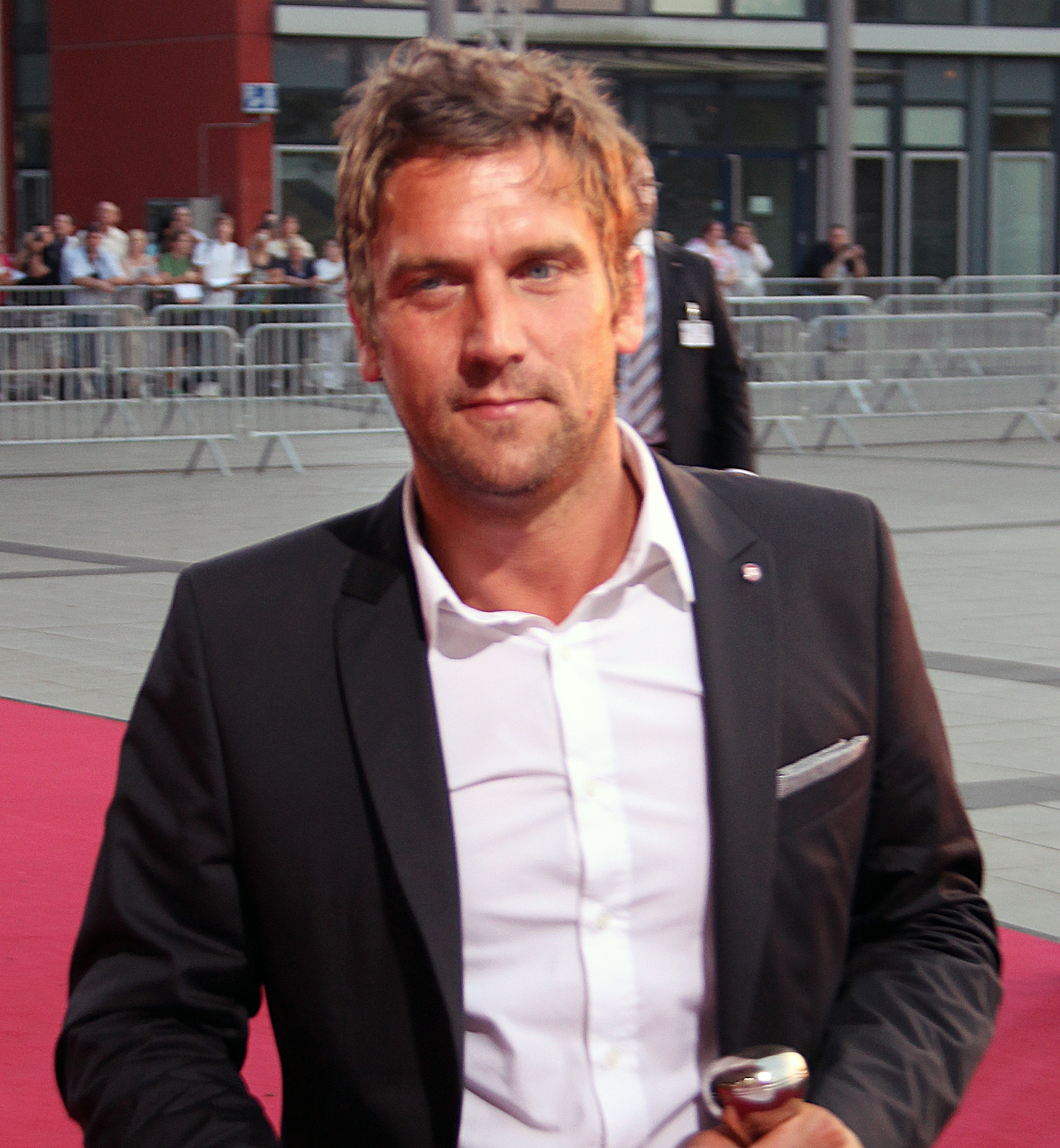
- Kusmagk in 2011
- Born: 14 June 1975 (age 51); West Berlin, West Germany
- Occupations: Actor and Television host
- Years active: 2001–present
- Known for: Ben Bachmann in Gute Zeiten, schlechte Zeiten; Winner of the 5th Ich bin ein Star – Holt mich hier raus! season
- Spouse: Charlotte Karlinder (2003-2005)

Peer Kusmagk (born 14 June 1975 in West Berlin) is a German actor and television host.

== Early life ==
After his graduation, he lived for three years in different countries and earned his living by doing odd jobs. He has lived in Africa and in Southern Europe and thus, he speaks fluent German, English, Spanish, Italian and French.

He completed his acting training at the Etage in Berlin and at the Lee Strasberg Theatre and Film Institute in Los Angeles. From 1999, he also took private acting lessons at the Summer Academy Theater with Herbert Fischer

== Private life ==
On 23 May 2003, he married the television host Charlotte Karlinder, three months after they had first met. In mid-2005, they separated and were divorced shortly thereafter. During his marriage with Karlinder he took a double surname, Peer Karlinder-Kusmagk. Since mid-2010, he is in a relationship with Isabella "Bella" Recke, the daughter of Helmut von Finck.

In 2004, he protested, together with his ex-wife Charlotte, at a fur fair in Berlin. The pair were charged with trespassing and vandalism due to a paint bomb attack during a press conference. In retrospect, however, they had to pay only the property damage amounting to €10,000.

Together with actor Rhon Diels, he opened in 2006, the French Bar / Restaurant La Raclette in the Berlin district of Friedrichshain-Kreuzberg. His restaurant was destroyed by fire in October 2010. According to the insurance report, the trigger was a faulty cable. Through the support of friends and his family, he could reopen his restaurant in November 2010.

== Professional life ==
Kusmagk started his career as a television host for the German sports channel DSF.

In spring of 2002, he was cast in a contract role on the soap opera Gute Zeiten, schlechte Zeiten. In his role as Ben Bachmann, Kusmagk became part of a major family at the time, portraying their oldest son. He first appeared on 11 April 2002. After his one-year contract came to an end, Kusmagk left the show, making his last on-screen appearance on 23 July 2003. Since then he stated several times that he'd return to the show if asked.

After leaving Gute Zeiten, schlechte Zeiten, Kusmagk was seen in the short-running sitcom Das Büro in the role of Lars Vollmer. In the following year he and his then-wife joined the Sat.1 morning show Frühstücksfernsehen. The couple hosted the show until their separation in 2005. Kusmagk then left the show without an official explanation, while his wife, Charlotte Karlinder, stayed for a while before leaving too. He then worked on various productions for VOX and ProSieben.

In 2008, Kusmagk took a guest role as eccentric fashion designer Niki di Lorenzo in Verbotene Liebe, where he shared most scenes with Miriam Lahnstein and Sina-Valeska Jung. He would be seen in other guest-starring roles in Leipzig Homicide in 2012 and Alarm für Cobra 11 in 2013.

Kusmagk became a competitor of the fifth season of Ich bin ein Star – Holt mich hier raus!. He stayed for the entire run of the season and won the reality show with a voting score of 69.77%; becoming "King of the Jungle". The fifth season aired from 14 January to 29 January 2011. As a winner of the show, Kusmagk became an often-seen guest in various variety shows on RTL. At the time, a potential short-term return to Gute Zeiten, schlechte Zeiten was widely rumored; with his role Ben still having three siblings on the show.

== Filmography ==
- My Brother Jack (1998)
- Unter uns (2000), Horst
- Gute Zeiten, schlechte Zeiten (2002–2003), Ben Bachmann
- Das Büro (2003–2004), Lars Vollmer
- Verbotene Liebe (2008), Niki di Lorenzo
- Leipzig Homicide (2012), Tim Keller
- Alarm für Cobra 11 (2013), Marco Bernhartz

== Television works ==
- Frühstücksfernsehen (2004–2005), Co-Host
- Ich bin ein Star – Holt mich hier raus! (2011), Winner
- The Dome (2011), Host
