= Bob McCarron =

Australian medic and special effects prosthetic makeup artist

- Born: Robert McCarron; July 1950 (age 76); Hammersmith, London, England
- Occupations: Medic, makeup artist
- Known for: I'm a Celebrity Get Me Out of Here! (2002–2019); Ich bin ein Star – Holt mich hier raus! (2004–present)

Robert McCarron OAM (born July 1950 in London, England) is an Australian medic and special effects prosthetic makeup artist who has worked on many international movies and television shows.

He was the medical supervisor for the opening and closing ceremonies of the Sydney 2000 Summer Olympics.

He is most recognisable from his on-screen appearances as "Medic Bob", in the UK series of I'm a Celebrity Get Me Out of Here! and as "Dr. Bob", in the German version, Ich bin ein Star – Holt mich hier raus!.

Ahead of the 22nd British series of I'm a Celebrity...Get Me Out of Here! in 2022, it was announced that Bob would not be returning, as he was reportedly too busy with other work commitments, and was replaced by another medic/doctor off screen. McCarron did not appear in the 2020 and 2021 series due to COVID-19 travel restrictions. Bob is still present on the German version, appearing in the 2026 season.

== Personal life ==
In 2004, he was awarded the Order of Australia Medal (OAM) for services to the community and Australian stage and film and his work as a paramedic. Bob is also a wildlife enthusiast and holds a degree in wildlife biology.

== Qualifications ==
Although he is not a medical doctor, on screen he is often referred to as "Dr Bob", at least on Ich bin ein Star – Holt mich hier raus!. He is a pre-hospital care practitioner and intensive care paramedic with degrees in nursing, para-medicine, pre-hospital medicine, and certificates in other specialised medical areas.

== Special effects prosthetic makeup ==
Bob has been responsible for the special effects and prosthetic makeup on many international films and stage productions.

Some notable films for which he has done the prosthetic makeup include: The Matrix, Vertical Limit (2000), Queen of the Damned (2002) and The Piano (1993).

He designed the wild boar and the prosthetic makeup for the 1984 film Razorback.

== Awards and nominations ==
McCarron has received shared awards and nominations for his film work.

Year	Film	Category	Nominated at	Result
1992	Braindead	Best Special Effects	Sitges Film Festival	Won
1983	The Return of Captain Invincible	"Caixa de Catalunya" (Box of Catalonia)	Sitges Film Festival	Won
2000	The Matrix	Best Make-Up	Saturn Award	Nominated
1999	Dark City	Best Make-Up	Saturn Award	Nominated
1993	Braindead	Best Special Effects	Saturn Award	Nominated
