= Sonja Zietlow =

German television presenter

- Born: 13 May 1968 (age 57); Bonn, West Germany
- Occupation: Television presenter
- Years active: 1993-present
- Known for: Hosting Ich bin ein Star - Holt mich hier raus! and the talk-show Sonja

Sonja Zietlow (born 13 May 1968) is a German television presenter.

== Biography ==
Zietlow was born in Bonn. After she graduated from school and before her media career began in 1993, she worked as the first officer for the German airline Lufthansa. When Zietlow was a candidate in a TV show, she was offered a job as a host. She began her career as a host of Hugo & Hexana and is most-famous for her ongoing hosting since 2004, of Ich bin ein Star – Holt mich hier raus!.

More-recently, Zietlow has hosted several RTL shows, most notably Der Schwächste fliegt!, a German adaptation of the hit BBC quiz-show The Weakest Link. Since 2004, she hosts Ich bin ein Star – Holt mich hier raus!, the German adaption of I'm a Celebrity...Get me out of here!. In 2004, she was awarded the title "Woman of the Year (Moderation)" by Maxim Deutschland.
