= Dancing on Ice (franchise) =

Television franchise

- Created by: London Weekend Television and Granada Television (now ITV Studios)
- Original work: Dancing on Ice
- Owner: ITV Studios
- Years: 2006–2025

Films and television
- Television series: Dancing on Ice (independent international versions, see below)

Miscellaneous
- Genre: Dance
- First aired: 14 January 2006; 20 years ago
- Last aired: 9 March 2025; 20 months ago

Dancing on Ice is a British made dance competition television series franchise produced around the world. The format, devised by London Weekend Television and Granada Television for ITV, has been a prime-time hit in eight countries, including Britain (2006–2025) and subsequently in Italy and Chile. In Australia, where it was titled Torvill and Dean's Dancing on Ice, it was axed after just one series owing to production costs.

== International versions ==
There have been a total of 51 winners of Dancing on Ice around the world.

Currently airing
An upcoming season
Status unknown
No longer airing

=== All Dancing on Ice series ===
Country	Local title	Network	Winners (Celebrity & Professional)	Judges	Presenter(s)
Argentina	Patinando por un Sueño	Channel 13	Season 1, 2007: Ximena Capristo & Marcelo Porce; Season 2, 2008: Leonardo Tusam & Analía Papa	Laura Ubfal; Marcelo Polino; Reina Reech; Florencia De La V	Marcelo Tinelli
Australia	Torvill and Dean's Dancing on Ice	Nine Network	Season 1, 2006: Jake Wall & Maria Filippov	Karen Barber; Alisa Camplin; Jason Gardiner; Belinda Noonan; Mark Storton	Jamie Durie; Sami Lukis
Brazil	Dança no Gelo	Rede Globo	Season 1, 2006: Murilo Rosa & Simone Pastuziak; Season 2, 2007: Iran Malfitano & Simone Pastuziak; Season 3, 2008: Leandro Scornavacca & Andréia Yonashiro	Five per week (no fixed jury)	Fausto Silva
Finland	Dancing on Ice	Nelonen	Season 1, 2013: Sauli Koskinen & Nea Ojala	Laura Lepistö; Mila Kajas; Mika Saarelainen; Anuliisa Uotila	Marja Hintikka; Lorenz Backman
Germany	Dancing on Ice (1, 4–5); Stars auf Eis (2–3)	RTL (1); ProSieben (2–3); Sat.1 (4–5)	Season 1, 2006: Ruth Moschner & Carl Briggs; Season 2, 2007: Oliver Petzokat & Kati Winkler; Season 3, 2007: Susanne Pätzold & Maurizio Margaglio; Season 4, 2019: Sarah Lombardi & Joti Polizoakis; Season 5, 2019: Eric Stehfest & Amani Fancy	Hans-Jürgen Bäumler (1); Klaus Brück (1); Reinhard Ketterer (1); Marika Kilius (1); Tanja Szewczenko (1); Jeanette Biedermann (2); Reinhold Mirmseker (2–3); Daniel Weiss (2–5); Kati Winkler (3); Katarina Witt (4–5); Judith Williams (4–5); Cale Kalay (4)	Wayne Carpendale (1); Mirjam Weichselbraun (1); Stefan Gödde (2); Katarina Witt (2–3); Oliver Petzokat (3); Daniel Boschmann (4–5); Marlene Lufen (4–5)
Greece	Dancing on Ice	ANT1	Season 1, 2011: Ioanna Pilixou & Andrei Bekh	Petros Kostopoulos; Elena Paparizou; Alexis Kostalas	Jenny Balatsinou
Hungary	Sztárok a jégen	TV2	Season 1, 2007: Ferenc Hujber & Major Andrea	Krisztina Regőczy; Xaver Varnus; Claudia Liptai	Attila Till; Nóra Szekeres
Italy	Notti sul ghiaccio	Rai 1	Season 1, 2006: Massimiliano Ossini & Silvia Fontana; Season 2, 2007: Ludovico Fremont & Silvia Fontana; Season 3, 2015: Giorgio Rocca & Eve Bentley	Marco Liorni (3); Selvaggia Lucarelli (3); Enzo Miccio (3); Gabriella Pession (3); Simona Ventura (3); Evelina Christillin (1–2); Alessandro de Leonardis (1–2); Arnaldo Colasanti (1); Vittorio Sgarbi (1); Edwige Fenech (1); Matilde Ciccia (1); Fabio Canino (2); Alba Parietti (2)	Milly Carlucci; Stefano Masciarelli (1)
Netherlands; Belgium (Flanders) (1)	Dancing on Ice	RTL 4 (1–2); VTM (1); SBS6 (3)	Season 1, 2006: Staf Coppens & Monique van der Velden; Season 2, 2007: Joris Putman & Sanne Samuels; Season 3, 2019–20: Tommie Christiaan & Klabera Komini	Katrien Pauwels (1); Thierry Smits (1); Jeroen Prins (1); Joan Haanappel (1–); Sjoukje Dijkstra (1–2); Chris de la Haye (2); Marc Forno (3); Ruben Reus (3)	Martijn Krabbé (1–2); Francesca Vanthielen (1); John Williams (2); Winston Gerschtanowitz (3); Patty Brard (3)
Norway	Isdans	TV2	Season 1, 2007: Pål Anders Ullevålsæter & Anna Pouchkov	Christer Tornell; Vibecke Sørensen; Knut Bjørnsen; Anita Thorenfeldt Selmer; Bjørg Røsto Jensen	Katrine Moholt; Tommy Steine
Poland	Gwiazdy tańczą na lodzie	TVP2	Season 1, 2007: Olga Borys & Sławomir Borowiecki; Season 2, 2008: Aleksandra Szwed & Sławomir Borowiecki; Season 3, 2008: Samuel Palmer & Agnieszka Dulej	Doda; Włodzimierz Szaranowicz; Renata Aleksander (3); Tomasz Jacyków (3); Maria Zuchowicz (1–2); Igor Kryszyłowicz (1–2)	Maciej Kurzajewski; Justyna Steczkowska (3); Tatiana Okupnik (2)
Romania	Dancing on Ice – Vis în doi	Antena 1	Season 1, 2022: Jean Gavril & Ana Maria Ion	Mihai Petre; Elwira Petre; Simona Pungă; Cornel Gheorghe	Ștefan Bănică Jr. Irina Fodor
Russia; Ukraine (4)	Танцы на льду Tantsy na 'ldu (1-2); Звёздный лёд Zvezdnyy led (3)	Russia	Season 1, 2006: Petr Krasilov & Oksana Grishuk; Season 2, 2007: Yuliya Koval'chuk & Petr Tchernyshev; Season 3, 2008: Lera Kudryavtseva & Gwendal Peizerat	Elena Tchaikovskaia (1–3) Nikolay Tsiskaridze (1–3); Igor Bobrin (1–3); Irina Moiseeva (1–2); Andrei Minenkov (1–2); Anastasia Zavorotnyuk (1-2); Yuri Nikolaev (1-2); Maxim Galkin (3)	
Russia; Ukraine (4)	Танцы на льду Dantsy na 'ldu (1); Звёзды на льду Zvyozdy na 'ldu (2); Ледниковый период Lednikovniy period (3–5; 7–9); Лёд и пламень Lyod i plamen (6)	Rossiya (1); Channel One (2–9); ICTV (4)	Season 1, 2006: Petr Krasilov & Oksana Grishuk; Season 2, 2006: Ekaterina Guseva & Roman Kostomarov; Season 3, 2007: Chulpan Khamatova & Roman Kostomarov; Season 4, 2008: Ekaterina Gordeeva & Yegor Beroyev; Season 5, 2009: Julia Kovalchuk & Roman Kostomarov; Season 6, 2011: Tatyana Navka & Alexey Vorobiev; Season 7, 2013: Oksana Domnina & Vladimir Yaglych; Season 8, 2014: Oksana Domnina & Ivan Skobrev; Season 9, 2016: Yulianna Karaulova & Maxim Trankov	Former Tatyana Tarasova (2–9); Valentin Piseev (2–6); Anton Sikharulidze (4–6); Ingeborga Dapkunaite (5–6); Tatyana Totmianina (5–6); Elena Vodorezova (2); Oleg Vasiliev (2); Ilze Liepa (2); Ekaterina Andreeva (2); Oleg Yankovsky (2); Vladislav Tretyak (2); Gennady Zyuganov (2); Chulpan Khamatova (7); Mikhail Boyarsky (7); Sergei Shakurov (7); Pavel Bure (7); Stas Namin (7); Natalia Bestemyanova (7); Emmanuel Vitorgan (7); Alexander Oleshko (7); Gediminas Taranda (7); Larisa Guzeeva (7); Alexei Chumakov (7); Victoria Dayneko (7); Vladislav Tretyak (7); Elena Malysheva (7); Mark Zakharov (7); Alexandra Zakharova (7); Philip Kirkorov (7); Konstantin Tszyu (7); Leonid Yarmolnik (7); Marina Neyolova (7); Efim Shifrin (7); Anna Chipovskaya (7); Vyacheslav Fetisov (7); Denis Matsuev (7); Hibla Gerzmava (7); Vladimir Spivakov (7); Valery Leontyev (7); Sergei Lazarev (7–8); Igor Bobrin (7–8); Timur Rodriguez (7–8); Adeline Sotnikova (8); Vyacheslav Fetisov (8); Ekaterina Gordeeva (8); Mikhail Galustyan (8); Alyona Babenko (8); Elena Malysheva (8); Gediminas Taranda (8); Ekaterina Vilkova (8); Julia Zimina (8); Alexander Revva (8); Vladislav Tretyak (8); Sergei Makovetsky (8); Alexander Oleshko (8); Anna Bolshova (8)	Former Alla Mikheeva (9); Alexey Yagudin (7–9); Evgeny Plushenko (2); Ingeborga Dapkunaite (3); Marat Basharov (3–4; 6); Anastasia Zavorotnyuk (4–6); Irina Slutskaya (2–3; 5; 7–8)
Slovakia	Hviezdy na ľade	TV JOJ	Season 1, 2006: Diana Mórová	Radka Kovaříková; René Novotný; Zdena Studenková; Martin Skotnický; Hilda Múdra	Matej Cifra; Michaela Majerníková
Spain	Desafío Bajo Cero	Telecinco	Season 1, 2006: Almudena Cid	Silvia Villellas; Jorge Lafarg; Antonio Canales; Blanca Fernández Ochoa; Carmen Morales	Manel Fuentes; José Luis Uribarri
Sweden	Stjärnor på is	TV4	Season 1, 2008: Markus Fagervall & Johanna Götesson	Britta Lindgren; Christer Tornell; Emanuele Ancorini; Lotta Tegnér; Fredrik Granqvist	Carolina Gynning; Carina Berg
Turkey	Buzda Dans	Show TV	Season 1, 2007: Zeynep Tokuş & Robert Beauchamp; Season 2, 2007: İlhan Mansız & Oľga Beständigová	Şebnem Ertaul (2); Hande Ataizi (2); Ahmet San (2); Cenk Ertaul (1–2); Olcayto Ahmet Tuğsuz (1–2); Sema Çelebi (1–2); Alinur Velidedeoğlu (1); Ayşe Arman (1); Zafer Baykal (1)	Behzat Uygur; Gamze Özçelik
United Kingdom	Dancing on Ice	ITV	Series 1, 2006: Gaynor Faye & Daniel Whiston; Series 2, 2007: Kyran Bracken & Melanie Lambert; Series 3, 2008: Suzanne Shaw & Matt Evers; Series 4, 2009: Ray Quinn & Maria Filippov; Series 5, 2010: Hayley Tamaddon & Daniel Whiston; Series 6, 2011: Sam Attwater & Brianne Delcourt; Series 7, 2012: Matthew Wolfenden & Nina Ulanova; Series 8, 2013: Beth Tweddle & Daniel Whiston; Series 9, 2014: Ray Quinn & Maria Filippov; Series 10, 2018: Jake Quickenden & Vanessa Bauer; Series 11, 2019: James Jordan & Alexandra Schauman; Series 12, 2020: Joe Swash & Alex Murphy; Series 13, 2021: Sonny Jay & Angela Egan; Series 14, 2022: Regan Gascoigne & Karina Manta; Series 15, 2023: Nile Wilson & Olivia Smart; Series 16, 2024: Ryan Thomas & Amani Fancy; Series 17, 2025: Sam Aston & Molly Lanaghan	Former Christopher Dean (10–17); Jayne Torvill (10–17); Ashley Banjo (10–17); Oti Mabuse (14–17); Karen Kresge (1); Natalia Bestemianova (2); Ruthie Henshall (3–4); Nicky Slater (1–5); Robin Cousins (1–9); Karen Barber (1–5, 8–9); Jason Gardiner (1–6, 8–11); Emma Bunton (5–6); Louie Spence (7); Katarina Witt (7); Ashley Roberts (8–9); John Barrowman (12–13); Guest; Michael Ball (5); Angela Rippon (5); Nicky Slater (9); Arlene Phillips (14); Johnny Weir (16)	Former Holly Willoughby (1–6, 10–17); Stephen Mulhern (14, guest; 16–17); Phillip Schofield (1–15); Christine Lampard (7–9); Jordan Banjo (10, backstage); Kem Cetinay (11–12, backstage)
United States	Skating with Celebrities	Fox	Season 1, 2006: Kristy Swanson & Lloyd Eisler	Dorothy Hamill; John Nicks; Mark Lund	Summer Sanders; Scott Hamilton

== Argentina ==
In Argentina, the show was broadcast on Channel 13 as a segment inside the television program "Showmatch", hosted by Marcelo Tinelli. It started on 9 August 2007, featuring an all-female cast. The segment was called "Patinando por un Sueño" (Ice-Skating for a Dream) due to the titles of the other segments: "Bailando por un Sueño" (Dancing for a Dream) and "Cantando por un Sueño" (Singing for a Dream).

=== Contestants ===
Place	Celebrity	Partner
W	Ximena Capristo (Model/Former GH contestant)	Marcelo Porce
F	Anita Martinez (Actress)	Hernán Cuevas
SF	Evangelina Anderson (Vedette/Model)	Adrián Baturin
SF	Jessica Cirio (Vedette/Model/Dancer)	Juan Carlos Acosta
5th	Luli Fernández (Model)	Jonathan López Luna
6th	Valeria Archimaut (Dancer)	Cristian Rodríguez
7th	Natalia Fava (Actress/Model/Former GH contestant)	Gastón Passini
8th	Eliana Guercio (Model/Actress)	Sergio Lois
9th	Marixa Balli (Actress/Singer)	César Agrelo
10th	Claudia Albertario (Actress/Model)	Fabio Gigli
11th	Wanda Nara (Model)	Diego Robles
12th	Jesica Cusnier (Model)	Julián García
13th	Claudia Fernández (Actress)	Omar Andrés Grimalt
14th	Mariana De Melo	Jonathan Matta
15th	Marina Calabró (Journalist/TV Host)	Fernando Belleggia
16th	Gladys Florimonte (Actress/Comedian)	Flavio Fisolo
17th	Fernanda Vives (Model)	Nicolás Gaudioso
18th	Victoria Vanucci (Model)	Pedro Romero
19th	Evangelina Carrozzo (Model/Beauty Queen)	Rodolfo Goldstein
20th	Analía Franchín (Journalist)	Diego González
21st	Belén Francese (Model/Actress)	Daniel Cejas

==== Jury votes ====
	1	2	3	4	5	6	7	8	9	10	11	12	13	14	15	16	17	18	FINALE	
Ximena	40	37	37	39	36	38	39	40	38	38	38	40	33	80	69	76	77	6	5	Winner
Anita	31	33	37	36	38	39	35	38	35	40	40	37	36	69	71	65	79	4	2	Finalist
Evangelina A.	35	38	36	37	33	35	35	35	37	35	37	37	32	65	70	76	76	2	Semifinalist	
Jessica Ci.	32	36	31	39	37	39	40	32	35	36	36	35	40	71	78	62	76	2	Semifinalist	
Luli	36	37	35	38	36	40	40	40	36	38	32	38	34	70	70	71	75	Eliminated		
Valeria	35	33	38	40	40	36	35	39	38	36	33	39	27	69	70	70	Eliminated			
Natalia	36	38	40	40	38	37	37	40	40	40	33	36	36	72	^{A}	Eliminated				
Eliana	31	38	36	35	35	30	39	31	40	34	33	38	31	67	Eliminated					
Marixa	37	40	32	36	36	36	36	36	36	36	35	38	31	Eliminated						
Claudia A.	35	36	35	39	36	40	34	39	40	35	36	36	Eliminated							
Wanda	32	33	32	34	34	38	33	35	40	36	33	Eliminated								
Jessica Cu.	30	35	34	34	33	35	36	36	34	33	Eliminated									
Claudia F.	30	37	37	32	37	32	35	38	33	Eliminated										
Mariana	30	30	34	32	33	36	31	35	Eliminated											
Marina	30	32	34	35	37	33	34	Eliminated												
Gladys	35	37	31	35	36	33	Eliminated													
Fernanda	28	33	31	35	33	Eliminated														
Victoria	32	36	32	34	Eliminated															
Evangelina C.	26	33	30	Eliminated																
Analía	32	30	Eliminated																	
Belén	26	Eliminated																		

- ^ANote: On week 15, during the performance Natalia had an accident, and she was unavailable to continue, so she became instantly nominated.

Biggest score.
Up for eviction and saved by the jury.
Up for eviction, and saved by the public.
Up for eviction, and eliminated of the show by the public.
Replaced by Adabel Guerrero, and had the biggest score.
Replaced by Adabel Guerrero.
Replaced by Adabel Guerrero, nominated, and saved by the public.
Replaced by Virginia Da Cunha.

==== Jury ====
The jury was made up of 2 "Celebrity" journalists and 2 personalities:

- Laura Ubfal, a "celebrity" journalist.
- Marcelo Polino, a "celebrity" journalist.
- Reina Reech, a former dancer, a choreographer and an artist director.
- Florencia De La V, a vedette, actress and dancer. Winner and contestant of "Bailando por un Sueño"

The jury's members also studied ice-skating practice and critical theory to support their knowledge.

== Brazil ==
In Brazil, the show was broadcast on Rede Globo as a segment inside the television program Domingão do Faustão, hosted by Faustão.

It premiered on 13 August 2006 and sparked protests by soap opera directors produced by the broadcaster, after actors who participated in such soap operas were injured in the rehearsals or presentations of the painting.

The competition had three seasons, ending on 25 November 2007.

Murilo Rosa (season 1), Iran Malfitano (season 2) and Leandro Scornavacca (season 3) were the winners of the respective seasons of the competition.

== Germany ==
There are five seasons of Dancing on Ice in Germany aired on different channels.

== Italy ==
The Italian version of Dancing on Ice (Notti sul ghiaccio) was aired on the channel Rai 1.

== The Netherlands & Belgium ==
In September 2006 Dutch broadcaster RTL 4 and Belgian broadcaster vtm started a combined Dutch-Belgian version of Dancing On Ice. The show featured 5 Dutch and 5 Belgian stars, who were paired up with several Dutch, Belgian and foreign ice skaters from Holiday on Ice. The show was hosted by Dutchman Martijn Krabbé and Belgian Francesca Vanthielen.

=== Contestants ===
Place	Celebrity	Partner
1st	Staf Coppens (Belgium) (TV Presenter)	Monique van der Velden
2nd	Froukje de Both (Netherlands) (Actress/TV Presenter/Radio DJ)	Vitaliy Baranov
3rd	Kelly Pfaff (Belgium) (Model)	Andrei Lipanov
4th	John Williams (Netherlands) (TV Presenter/Actor)	Melanie Carrington
5th	Wendy van Dijk (Netherlands) (TV Presenter)	Ruben Reus
6th	Wim Soutaer (Belgium) (Singer)	Joëlle Bastiaanse
7th	Pascale Naessens (Belgium) (Model/TV Presenter)	Franck Levier
8th	Luc Appermont (Belgium) (TV Presenter)	Ellen Mareels
9th	Babette van Veen (Netherlands) (Actress/Singer)	Thomas Hopman
10th	Bert Kuizenga (Netherlands) (TV Presenter/Actor)	Chouw-Lan Chan

=== Jury ===
The jury was made up of 3 Dutch and 2 Belgian experts:

- Katrien Pauwels (Belgium), a former figure skater who represented her country at the 1984 and 1988 Winter Olympics.
- Thierry Smits (Belgium), a world-renowned choreographer.
- Jeroen Prins (Netherlands), a former figure skater and currently a judge at international figure skating events. His former coach was Joan Haanappel.
- Joan Haanappel (Netherlands), a former figure skater who is a three time bronze medallist at the European Championships. She represented the Netherlands at the 1956 and 1960 Olympics, where she finished 13th and 5th respectively.
- Sjoukje Dijkstra (Netherlands), the 1964 Olympic Champion of Figure Skating. She also won the silver medal at the Olympics of 1960, as well as gold in 5 European Championships and 3 World Championships.

During RTL4-VTM's broadcast of the Dutch-Belgian version of Dancing on Ice, the Dutch broadcaster SBS6 broadcast a similar programme called Sterren Dansen Op Het IJs (translation: Stars are Dancing on Ice). The show, which ran from August–October 2006 was hosted by Nance Coolen and Gerard Joling. The winner was Hein Vergeer, a former World Champion of speedskating. Singer Jody Bernal came second and former Dutch Idol runner-up Maud Mulders took the bronze. The SBS-show featured only Dutch stars and drew a bigger audience than its Dutch-Belgian counterpart.

== Netherlands ==
In 2007, a second series of Dancing On Ice aired in the Netherlands. This time the stars were all Dutch (except Dieter Troubleyn, who is Flemish, but known in the Netherlands).

=== Contestants ===
Place	Celebrity	Partner
1st	Joris Putman (Actor)	Sanne Samuels
2nd	Quinty Trustfull (TV Presenter)	Stuart Widdall
3rd	Sander Janson (TV Presenter)	Chouw-Lan Chan
4th	Winston Gerschtanowitz (TV Presenter)	Katja Golovatenko
5th	Antoni Wanders	Nancy Broeders
6th	Mariëlle Bastiaansen (TV Presenter)	Joel Mangs
7th	Jan Postulart (Dancing with the Stars Jury Member)	Joëlle Bastiaanse
8th	Stella Gommans (TV Presenter)	Ruben Reus
9th	John Jones (Actor)	Katie Stainsby( Choreographer to dancing on ice)
10th	Dieter Troubleyn (Actor)	Theresa Schumann
11th	Marilou le Grand (TV Presenter)	Mike Aldred
12th	Kelly van der Veer (former Big Brother contestant)	Andy Renard
13th	Regilio Tuur (Former Boxer)	Janna Forrovà
14th	Suze Mens (Daughter of TV Presenter, Harry Mens)	Jozef Beständig

Martijn Krabbé returns to present the show. John Williams (contestant of the first series) will co-host. Joan Haanappel and Sjoukje Dijkstra return in the jury. Chris de la Haye is a new member of the jury.

=== Revival ===
A third series was re-commissioned for the 2019-2020 season by SBS6 in the Netherlands, following a deal with ITV Studios Global Entertainment. The first show in the series was broadcast on 7 December 2019, hosted by Winston Gerschtanowitz and Patty Brard. The members of the judging panel were Marc Forno, Joan Haanapel and Ruben Reus.

==== Participants ====
Not in order of elimination

Famous Dutchman	Partner	Status
Celine Huijsmans (Actress)	Allen Shannon	
Donny Roelvink (Actor)	Maria Sergejeva	Finalist
Sabine Uitslag (Actress)	Craig Norris	
Elske DeWall (Actress)	Marc-Olivier Delorme English	Finalist
Roy Donders (Actor)	Alejandra Izquierdo Pons	
Juvat Westendorp (Actor)	Lauren Farr	
Charly Luske (Singer)	Shelby Sylvester	
Nicolien Sauerbreij (Olympic Gold Medalist, Snowboarding)	Matej Silecky	SemiFinalist
Tommie Christiaan (Singer)	Klabera Komeni	WINNER

== Norway ==
In 2007 the first series of Isdans aired in Norway.

=== Contestants ===
Place	Celebrity	Partner
1st	Pål Anders Ullevålsæter (Rally motor cyclist)	Anna Pouchkov
TBA	Sandra Lyng Haugen (Singer)	Aleksander Sunde Iversen
TBA	Dorthe Skappel (TV Presenter)	Janusz Komendera
TBA	Per Christian Ellefsen (Actor)	Marianne Fjørtoft
TBA	Anette Bøe (Retired cross country skier)	Oleksandr Smokvin
TBA	Jim Marthinsen (Retired ice hockey player)	Kaja Hanevold

== Poland - Gwiazdy tańczą na lodzie ==
Jury

- Maria Zuchowicz,
- Igor Kryszyłowicz,
- Doda,
- Włodzimierz Szaranowicz.

=== First edition ===
First Polish edition started on 28 September 2007 on TVP2

Place	Celebrity	Skater
1	Olga Borys	Sławomir Borowiecki
2	Rafał Mroczek	Aneta Kowalska
3	Katarzyna Glinka	Łukasz Dzióbek
4	Anna Popek	Filip Bernadowski
5	Przemysław Saleta	Agata Rosłońska
6	Piotr Zelt	Agnieszka Dulej
7	Przemysław Babiarz	Michaela Krutská
8	Maria Sadowska	Roger Lubicz-Sawicki
9	Zygmunt Chajzer	Aleksandra Kauc
10	Ewa Sonnet	Łukasz Jóźwiak
11	Jarosław Kret	Sherri Kennedy
12	Beata Sadowska	Sławomir Janicki
13	Christina Bien	Maciej Lewandowski
14	Ewelina Serafin	Michał Więcek

=== Second edition ===
Second Polish edition started on 7 March 2008 on TVP2

Place	Celebrity	Skater
1	Aleksandra Szwed	Sławomir Borowiecki
2	Marcin Krawczyk	Magdalena Komorowska
3	Aneta Florczyk	Maciej Lewandowski / Marcin Czajka
4	Robert Moskwa	Sherry Kennedy / Aneta Kowalska
5	Weronika Książkiewicz	Łukasz Jóźwiak
6	Karolina Nowakowska	Filip Bernadowski
7	Tomasz Iwan	Agata Rosłońska
8	Małgorzata Pieczyńska	Radek Dostál
9	Robert Rozmus	Agnieszka Dulej
10	Katarzyna Pietras	Łukasz Dzióbek
11	Marek Kościkiewicz	Aleksandra Kauc
12	Marcin Rój	Elena Sokolova

=== Third edition ===
Third Polish edition started on 3 October 2008 on TVP2.

Place	Celebrity	Skater
1	Samuel Palmer	Agnieszka Dulej
2	Agnieszka Włodarczyk	Łukasz Jóżwiak
3	Katarzyna Zielińska	Filip Bernadowski
4.	Beata Ścibakówna	Radek Dostál
5.	Michał Milowicz	Michaela Krutská
6.	Rafał Cieszyński	Elena Sokolova
7.	Gosia Andrzejewicz	Nicholas Keagen
8.	Paweł Konnak	Agata Rosłońska
9.	Katarzyna Burzyńska	Roger Lubicz-Sawicki
10.	Conrado Moreno	Magdalena Komorowska
11.	Jolanta Rutowicz	Łukasz Dzióbek
12.	Karolina Malinowska	Jan Luggenhölscher

== Russia ==
The Russian version of Dancing on Ice (Танцы на льду) was being aired on Rossiya TV channel since September 2006, and was renamed in 2008 to Star Ice (Звёздный лёд). Its counterpart called Ice Age (Ледниковый период, initially Stars on Ice - Звёзды на льду) was being broadcast on Channel One.

=== Season 1 ===
Place	Celebrity	Occupation / known for	Skater
1	Petr Krasilov	Actor	Oksana Grishuk
2	Sergey Lazarev	Singer	Anastasia Grebenkina
3	Irina Tchachina	rithmic gymnast	Ruslan Goncharov
4	Sergey Selin	Actor	Oksana Kazakova
5	Lika Kremer	host & actress	Artur Dmitriev
6	Anna Azarova	Actress & model	Evgeni Platov
7	Tatyana Dogileva	Actress	Alexei Urmanov
8	Sergey Galanin	Singer	Maria Butyrskaya
9	Lada Dance	Singer	Vazgen Azrojan
10	Ivars Kalniņš	Actor	Maya Usova

== Slovakia ==
The Slovak version of Dancing on Ice (Hviezdy na ľade) is aired since September 2006 on TV JOJ.

== Turkey ==
=== First edition ===
The Turkish version of Dancing on Ice is called Buzda Dans (Dance on Ice) started on 8 January 2007 on Show TV. The final was broadcast on 11 March 2007. The winner Zeynep Tokuş received a golden skate shoe trophy and a prize of TRY 100,000 (approximately US$ 71,000 ).

==== Contestants ====
Place	Celebrity	Partner
1st	Zeynep Tokuş (Actress)	Robert Beauchamp
2nd	Asena (dancer) (Belly dancer)	Jan Luggenhölscher
3rd	Bülent Polat (Actor)	Oľga Beständigová
TBA	Mehmet Aslan (Actor)	Ouida Robins
TBA	Pınar Aylin (Singer)	Jan Nerad
TBA	Tuğba Ekinci (Singer)	Romain Gazave
TBA	Okan Karacan (DJ)	Lucie Kadlakova
TBA	Alp Kırşan (Actor)	Julia Novikov
TBA	Jennifer Şebnem Schaefer (Model)	Kevin Stefan
TBA	Yıldo (Showman)	Alena Kramplova

==== Hosts ====
- Behzat Uygur (son of Nejat Uygur and brother of Süheyl Uygur)
- Gamze Özçelik (actress and model)

==== Jury ====
The first version of the Turkish version of the show had 2 ice skating experts, and 4 amateurs in the jury. Figure-skating experts were:

- Zafer Baykal
- Cenk Ertaul

The other jury members were:

- Ayşe Arman (journalist)
- Olcayto Ahmet Tuğsuz (journalist)
- Sema Çelebi (society member)

=== Second edition ===
The Turkish version of Dancing on Ice called Buzda Dans (Ice Dance) was repeated for a second season in 2007/2008 Winter. The jury members who are not experts of ice dance were Olcayto Ahmet Tuğsuz, Hande Ataizi, Ahmet San and Sema Çelebi. The experts in the jury were Cenk Ertaul and Şebnem Ertaul. The winner of the show was former football player İlhan Mansız, the runner-up was actress Yasemin Hadivent. The partner of Mansız was Oľga Beständigová.

== United States ==
An American adaptation, Skating with Celebrities, aired for a single season on Fox in 2006.

A similar series, Skating with the Stars, aired on ABC in 2010, but was produced by BBC Worldwide as a spin-off of Dancing with the Stars.
