= Dancing on Ice (German TV series) =

- Created by: ITV Studios
- Presented by: Wayne Carpendale; Mirjam Weichselbraun; Katarina Witt; Stefan Gödde; Oliver Petzokat; Daniel Boschmann; Marlene Lufen
- Judges: Hans-Jürgen Bäumler; Klaus Brück; Reinhard Ketterer; Marika Kilius; Tanja Szewczenko; Jeanette Biedermann; Reinhold Mirmseker; Daniel Weiss; Kati Winkler; Katarina Witt; Judith Williams; Cale Kalay
- Country of origin: Germany
- No. of seasons: 4
- No. of episodes: 36

Production
- Production locations: Cologne (1, 4–5); Rust (2–3)
- Running time: approx. 180 to 200 minutes per episode (including commercials)

Original release
- Network: RTL (1); ProSieben (2–3); Sat.1 (4–5)
- Release: 9 October 2006 – 20 December 2019

Dancing on Ice is a German reality TV show. The show features celebrities paired with professionals from the world of figure skating. The show is based on the British show, Dancing on Ice. The show has a schedule similar to the reality TV show Let's Dance. The show started airing on October 9, 2006 on RTL.

== Series overview ==
Four series have been broadcast to date, as summarised below.

Series	Title	Start	Finish	Couples	Weeks	Winning celebrity	Winning professional	Channel	Presenters		Ice panel				
1	Dancing on Ice	9 October 2006	2 December 2006	8	8	Ruth Moschner	Carl Briggs	RTL	Wayne Carpendale	Mirjam Weichselbraun	Hans-Jürgen Bäumler	Marika Kilius	Klaus Brück	Reinhard Ketterer	Tanja Szewczenko
2	Stars auf Eis	18 October 2006	29 November 2006	9	7	Oliver Petzokat	Kati Winkler	ProSieben	Katarina Witt	Stefan Gödde	Daniel Weiss	Jeanette Biedermann	Reinhold Mirmseker		
3	Stars auf Eis	13 December 2007	7 February 2008	12	9	Susanne Pätzold	Maurizio Margaglio	ProSieben	Katarina Witt	Oliver Petzokat	Daniel Weiss	Kati Winkler	Reinhold Mirmseker		
4	Dancing on Ice	6 January 2019	10 February 2019	8	6	Sarah Lombardi	Joti Polizoakis	Sat.1	Daniel Boschmann	Marlene Lufen	Daniel Weiss	Katarina Witt	Judith Williams	Cale Kalay	
5	Dancing on Ice	15 November 2019	20 December 2019	10	6	Eric Stehfest	Amani Fancy	Sat.1	Daniel Boschmann	Marlene Lufen	Daniel Weiss	Katarina Witt	Judith Williams		

== Presenters and judges ==
Key
Presenter
Judge

Cast	Series				
Cast	1	2	3	4	5
Wayne Carpendale					
Mirjam Weichselbraun					
Katarina Witt					
Stefan Gödde					
Oliver Petzokat					
Daniel Boschmann					
Marlene Lufen					
Hans-Jürgen Bäumler					
Klaus Brück					
Reinhard Ketterer					
Marika Kilius					
Tanja Szewczenko					
Daniel Weiss					
Jeanette Biedermann					
Reinhold Mirmseker					
Kati Winkler					
Judith Williams					
Cale Kalay					

== Professionals ==
Winner
Runner-up
Third place
First eliminated
Withdrew
Participating

Professional	Season 1	Season 2	Season 3	Season 4	Season 5
Alexander Gazsi	—N/a			Désirée Nick	—N/a
Amani Fancy	—N/a			Timur Bartels	Eric Stehfest
Annette Dytrt	—N/a	Ande Werner	—N/a	John Michael Kelly	—N/a
Carl Briggs	Ruth Moschner	—N/a			
Darya Nucci	Lars Riedel	—N/a	Boris Entrup	—N/a	
David Vincour	—N/a			Sarina Nowak	Nadine Angerer
Denise Biellmann	—N/a	Pierre Geisensetter	Patrick Bach	—N/a	
Hendryk Schamberger	Liz Baffoe	—N/a			
Jamal Othman	—N/a				Jenny Elvers
Jan Luggenhölscher	Michelle	—N/a	Giulia Siegel	—N/a	
Joti Polizoakis	—N/a			Sarah Lombardi	Lina Larissa Strahl
Katharina "Kat" Rybkowski	—N/a			Detlef Soost	Peer Kusmagk
Kati Winkler	—N/a	Oliver Petszokat	—N/a		
Mandy Wötzel	Sven Ottke	—N/a			
Matthias Bleyer	—N/a	Annabelle Mandeng	—N/a		
Matti Landgraf	—N/a			Aleksandra Bechtel	—N/a
Maurizio Margaglio	—N/a		Susanne Pätzold	—N/a	
Mikkeline Kierkgaard	—N/a	Eberhard Gienger	Frank Matthée	—N/a	
Myriam Leuenberger	—N/a			Kevin Kuske	—N/a
Niko Ulanovsky	—N/a				Nadine Klein
Norman Jeschke	—N/a	Magdalena Brzeska	Christina Surer	—N/a	
Paul Pradel	—N/a		Yvonne Schröder	—N/a	
Pauline Schubert	—N/a		Patrick Nuo	—N/a	
Ramona Elsener	—N/a				Joey Heindle
René Lohse	—N/a	Charlotte Engelhardt	Verena Kerth	—N/a	
Rico Rex	Collien Ulmen-Fernandes	—N/a			
Sabrina Cappellini	—N/a				Jens Hilbert
Sarah Jentgens	Marco Schreyl	—N/a			
Sevan Lerche	—N/a				Klaudia Giez
Silvio Smalun	—N/a	Lucy Diakovska	—N/a		
Stina Martini	—N/a				André Hamann
Susanne Peters	—N/a		Bürger Lars Dietrich	—N/a	
Susanne Peters	—N/a		Carsten Spengemann	—N/a	
Theresa Schumann	Branko Vukovic	—N/a			
Theresa Schumann	Marco Schreyl	—N/a			
Vladimir Tsvetkov	—N/a	Heike Drechsler	Nina Bott	—N/a	

== Main series results ==
=== Series 1 (2006) ===
Celebrity	Known for	Professional partner	Status
Collien Ulmen-Fernandes	Television Presenter	Rico Rex	Eliminated 1st
Liz Baffoe	Actress	Hendryk Schamberger	Eliminated 2nd
Michelle	Singer	Jan Luggenhölscher	Eliminated 3rd
Lars Riedel	Olympic Discus Champion Atlanta 1996	Darya Nucci	Eliminated 4th
Sven Ottke	Former Boxing World Champion	Mandy Wötzel	Eliminated 5th
Branko Vukovic	Actor	Theresa Schumann	Eliminated 6th
Marco Schreyl	Television Presenter	Sarah Jentgens (Episodes 1-7)	Runner-up
Marco Schreyl	Television Presenter	Theresa Schumann (Episode 8)	Runner-up
Ruth Moschner	Television Presenter	Carl Briggs	Winner

=== Series 2 (2006) ===
Celebrity	Known for	Professional partner	Status
Pierre Geisensetter	Television Presenter	Denise Biellmann	Eliminated 1st
Heike Drechsler	Athlete	Vladimir Tsvetkov	Eliminated 2nd
Eberhard Gienger	Politician	Mikkeline Kierkgaard	Eliminated 3rd
Ande Werner	Comedian	Annette Dytrt	Eliminated 4th
Magdalena Brzeska	Athlete	Norman Jeschke	Eliminated 5th
Annabelle Mandeng	Television Presenter	Matthias Bleyer	Fourth place
Lucy Diakovska	Singer	Silvio Smalun	Third place
Charlotte Engelhardt	Television Presenter	René Lohse	Runner up
Oliver Petszokat	Singer, Actor & Television Presenter	Kati Winkler	Winner

=== Series 3 (2007-08) ===
Celebrity	Known for	Professional partner	Status
Boris Entrup	Make-up Artist	Darya Nucci	Eliminated 1st
Verena Kerth	Television Presenter	René Lohse	Eliminated 2nd
Giulia Siegel	Model & Actress	Jan Luggenhölscher	Eliminated 3rd
Nina Bott	Actress	Vladimir Tsvetkov	Eliminated 4th
Yvonne Schröder	Model	Paul Pradel	Eliminated 5th
Bürger Lars Dietrich	Comedian & Singer	Susanne Peters	Withdrew
Carsten Spengemann	Actor & Television Presenter	Susanne Peters	Eliminated 6th
Patrick Bach	Actor	Denise Biellmann	Eliminated 7th
Christina Surer	Race Car Driver & Model	Norman Jeschke	Eliminated 8th
Frank Matthée	Television Presenter	Mikkeline Kierkgaard	Third place
Patrick Nuo	Songwriter & Model	Pauline Schubert	Runner up
Susanne Pätzold	Actress & Comedian	Maurizio Margaglio	Winner

=== Series 4 (2019) ===
Celebrity	Known for	Professional partner	Status
Désirée Nick	actress & comedian & author	Alexander Gazsi	Eliminated 1st
Kevin Kuske	Bobsleigh	Myriam Leuenberger	Eliminated 2nd
Detlef Soost	dancer & choreographer	Katharina "Kat" Rybkowski	Eliminated 3rd
Timur Bartels	Actor	Amani Fancy	Withdrew
Aleksandra Bechtel	television presenter	Matti Landgraf	Eliminated 4th
Sarina Nowak	Curvy-Model	David Vincour	Third place
John Michael Kelly	Musician	Annette Dytrt	Runner up
Sarah Lombardi	Singer & Deutschland sucht den Superstar runner-up	Joti Polizoakis	Winner

=== Series 5 (2019) ===
Celebrity	Known for	Professional partner	Status
Jens Hilbert	Entrepreneur	Sabrina Cappellini	Eliminated 1st
Nadine Klein	Influencer & contestant on Der Bachelor 2018 & Die Bachelorette 2018	Niko Ulanovsky	Eliminated 2nd
Jenny Elvers	Actress	Jamal Othman	Eliminated 3rd
Klaudia Giez	Contestant on 13th season of Germany's Next Topmodel	Sevan Lerche	Eliminated 4th
Peer Kusmagk	Actor & Host	Katharina "Kat" Rybkowski	Eliminated 5th
Nadine Angerer	German footballer	David Vincour	Eliminated 6th
André Hamann	Model	Stina Martini	Eliminated 7th
Lina Larissa Strahl	singer-songwriter & actress	Joti Polizoakis	Third place
Joey Heindle	Singer & 5th place in season 9 of Deutschland sucht den Superstar	Ramona Elsener	Runner up
Eric Stehfest	Actor	Amani Fancy	Winner
