= MIA. (German band) =

German pop/rock band

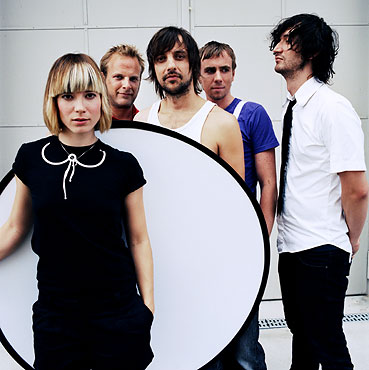

Background information
- Origin: Berlin, Germany
- Genres: German rock, pop
- Years active: 1997–present
- Labels: R.O.T. (production); Columbia (distribution)
- Members: Mieze Katz (vocals); Gunnar Spies (drums); Robert "Bob" Schütze (bass); Andy Penn (guitar)
- Past members: Hannes Schulze; Ingo Puls
- Website: miarockt.de

MIA. (alternative spelling: Mia.) is a German punk/new wave/rock/pop band from Berlin.

== Biography ==
MIA. originally formed in 1997 when TV host Sarah Kuttner introduced schoolmates Mieze Katz and Andreas Ross (who later changed his name to Andy Penn) to Robert Schütze and Ingo Puls. They took on Hannes Schulze as drummer and one year later the band, then called Me in Affairs, signed a contract with newly formed independent music label R.O.T. (Respect or Tolerate). They soon abbreviated their band name to MIA., but now claim the letters do no longer stand just for Me in Affairs, but also for things like "Musik ist Alles" ("Music is everything") and that there is no such thing as a "correct" translation of their name.

In 1999, the band released its first single "Sugar My Skin" on major label BMG, but due to artistic differences the members soon asked to be released from that contract. In 2001 they followed up with their second single "Factory City". At the same time Gunnar Spies replaced Hannes Schulze, who had left the group for personal reasons. Afterwards MIA. released their debut album Hieb & StichFEST via Sony Music, which had moderate success in Germany.

2003 saw the band being heavily criticized for their song "Was es ist" ("What it is"), released on an EP of the same title. The lyrics, based on a reference to Erich Fried's 1983 love poem of the same name, featured romantic references to Germany and the colours of the German flag, topics that due to Germany's difficult history, especially the 'Third Reich'-era, many political leftists and especially Anti-Germans consider forbidden territory. MIA. claim the song was meant to provoke a discussion about Germany as a home and as a place to change and design. Furthermore, they consider themselves politically on the left.

In 2004, the band went on with its second album Stille Post. The longplayer spawned three singles, including "Hungriges Herz" ("Hungry Heart"), which was chosen for the German pre-selection of the Eurovision Song Contest and reached number 24 on the official Singles Chart. The album simultaneously peaked at number 13 on the Album 100 and was eventually certified with gold.

Their third album Zirkus was released on 21 July 2006. It entered and peaked the German album charts at number 2, making it a surprise hit for the band and MIA.'s most successful album so far. The first single from the album, "Tanz der Moleküle" ("Dance of the Molecules") had previously entered the charts at number 19 and remained in the German top 100 for 33 weeks, making it the group's most successful single to that point.

In early 2007, MIA. competed in the Bundesvision Song Contest with their single "Zirkus" and came in fourth place.

On 7 July 2007, MIA. performed at the German leg of Live Earth in Hamburg.

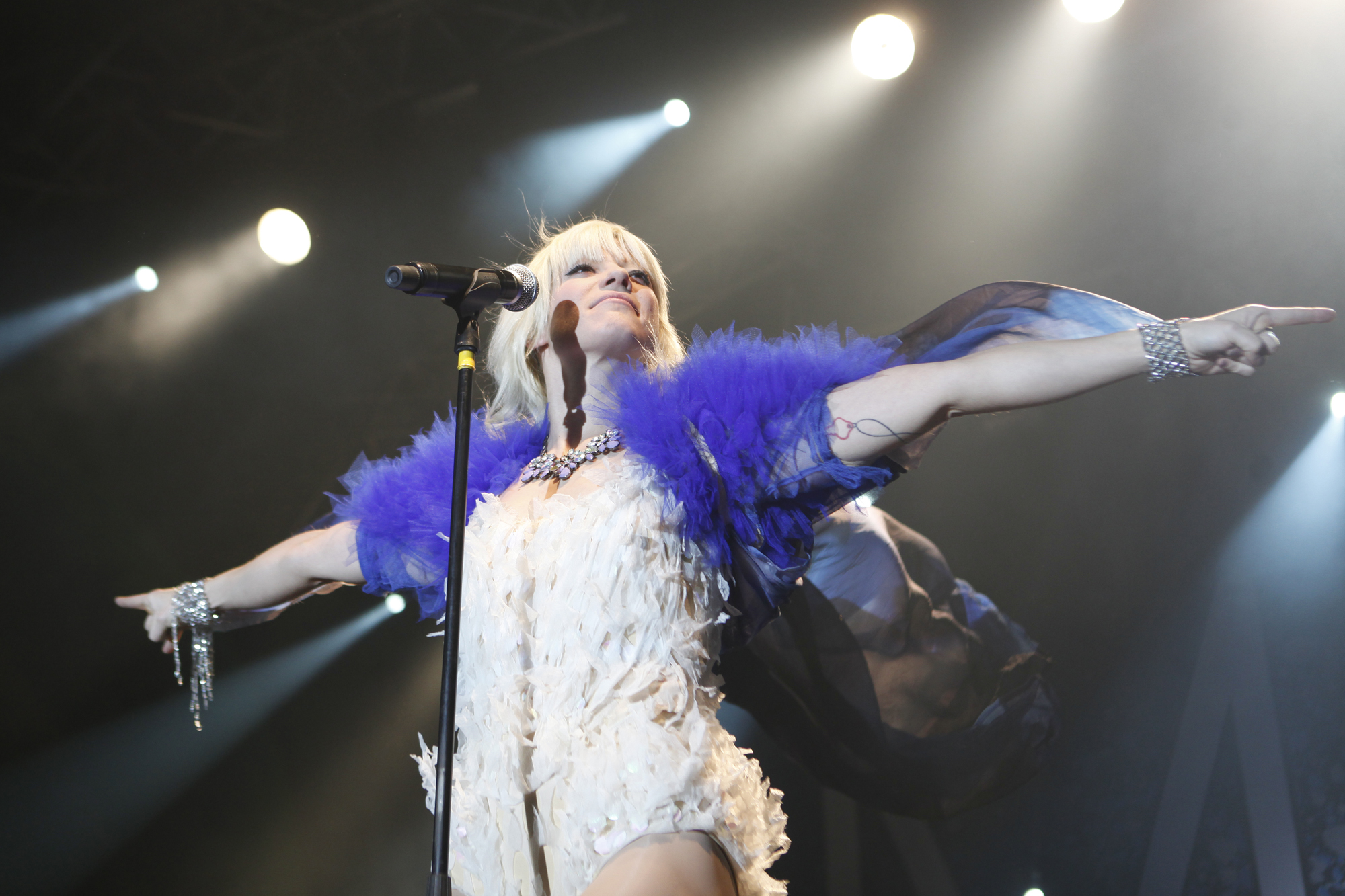
Frontwoman Mieze Katz

During a live appearance in Bonn on 19 April 2008, the band introduced their new song "Mein Freund" ("My Friend"). It was the first single from their fourth album Willkommen im Club (Welcome to the Club) released in September and debuting at number 4 on the German album charts. According to newspaper reports, the band also planned to release that album in an English-language version, which, however, never happened.

In the summer of 2009, the band announced during an interview with their official fan club that they would take a year-long break from touring, writing, and recording, beginning 6 September. Upon their return they wrote and recorded a fifth studio album, Tacheles, which they announced in late 2011 and published in March 2012. Ingo Puls left MIA. in 2011 due to undisclosed reasons while the rest of the band was working on the album. The first single from the album, "Fallschirm" ("Parachute") entered the charts at number 11, the highest chart position for any MIA. single so far.

== Other activities by band members ==
- Guitarist Andy Penn also has a solo career playing electronic music under the pseudonym TimTim. He released an album called "Let's Pretend We're Going" in 2003 and remixed songs for bands he or MIA. are friends with (such as Wir sind Helden, Virginia Jetzt! or Delbo). Lately he has remixed mostly MIA.'s own songs.
- Except for Robert Schütze, all members of the band have appeared as musicians on releases by other artists, e.g. Mieze Katz as a back-up singer with Virginia Jetzt! on their album Wer hat Angst for Virginia Jetzt! or in a duet with Fettes Brot in their song "Das traurigste Mädchen der Stadt", Andy Penn as a guitarist on the track "A Pointless Life" by Tok Tok vs. Soffy O., Ingo Puls as a horn player on the album Von hier an blind by Wir sind Helden, and Gunnar Spies as a drummer on Elke Brauweiler's album Twist à Saint Tropez.
- Mieze Katz, Andi Penn and Robert Schütze appeared as extras in 2002 movie Führer Ex. The band also contributed three songs to the film's soundtrack.
- Mieze Katz sings the German version of the title theme for the animated series Ruby Gloom.
- Mieze Katz is a jury member of season 11 of Deutschland sucht den Superstar.

== Discography ==
=== Albums ===
- Hieb & StichFEST (2002)
- Stille Post (2004, rereleased later that year as a limited special edition with remixes and a DVD)
- Zirkus (2006, rereleased in 2007 as a special edition with videos and bonus features in an enhanced CD part)
- Willkommen im Club (2008)
- Tacheles (2012)
- Biste Mode (2015)
- Limbo (2020)
- Euphorie & Alltag (2026)

=== Singles ===
Year	Title	Chart Positions		Album	Comment
Year	Title	GER	AUT	Album	Comment
1999	"Sugar My Skin"	—	—	(Non-album release)	
2000	"Factory City"	—	—	(Non-album release)	A remix was later included on Hieb & StichFEST
2002	"Alles neu"	78	—	Hieb & StichFEST	
2002	"Verrückt"	—	—	Hieb & StichFEST	
2003	"Kreisel"	—	—	Hieb & StichFEST	
2003	"Was es ist"	50	—	(Non-album EP)	The song "Was es ist" and a remix of another song were later included on Stille Post
2004	"Hungriges Herz"	24	58	Stille Post	
2004	"Ökostrom"	71	—	Stille Post	
2004	"Sonne"	84	—	Stille Post	
2006	"Tanz der Moleküle"	19	32	Zirkus	Remained in the German Top 100 for a total of 40 weeks.
2006	"Uhlala (Damit du fühlst)"	86	—	Zirkus	
2007	"Zirkus"	55	64	Zirkus	
2007	"Engel"	76	—	Zirkus	The fans voted for this song over "Floß" to be released as a single.
2008	"Mein Freund"	15	33	Willkommen im Club	
2008	"Mausen"	70	—	Willkommen im Club	
2012	"Fallschirm"	11	43	Tacheles	
2012	"Immer wieder"	—	—	Tacheles	Only download single
2013	"Freakin' Out" (Lina Larissa Strahl feat. MIA.)	63	—	Dein Song 2013	
2015	"Lauffeuer"	—	—	Biste Mode	
