= Gwiazdy tańczą na lodzie =

- Created by: ITV; TVP2
- Presented by: Tatiana Okupnik (Season 1 – 2); Maciej Kurzajewski (Season 1 – 3); Justyna Steczkowska (Season 3)
- Country of origin: Poland
- No. of seasons: 3

Production
- Production location: Warsaw
- Running time: approx. 120 to 150 minutes per episode (including commercials)

Original release
- Network: TVP2
- Release: 2007 – 2008

Gwiazdy tańczą na lodzie (English: Stars Are Dancing on Ice) is a Polish light entertainment reality television series broadcast by TVP2. It is the Polish version of the ITV's popular Dancing on Ice.

The 1st season of Gwiazdy tańczą na lodzie aired in Poland on TVP2 in the autumn of 2007, the 2nd in the spring of 2008, the 3rd season in the autumn of 2008.

== Format ==
Each week the celebrities and their partners perform a live ice dance routine. The four judges judge each performance and give a mark between 0.0 and 10.0, depending on the performance. These total scores create a leaderboard which combines with the public vote in order to determine the two lowest placed couples. As this is the case, the pair with the lowest score from the judges can avoid being in the bottom two if the public vote for them.

Once the scores and votes are combined to form the final leaderboard for that week's show, the two couples at the bottom compete in a final showdown known as the "Skate Off", where they perform their routine again. Once both couples have performed their routines for the judging panel, the five judges decide on who deserves to stay and cast their votes, based on their second performance. The couple with the most votes from the judges receives a place in the following week's show, while the couple with the fewest votes leaves the competition.

== Cast timeline ==
Color key:

Host	Co-host	Judge	Guest Judge

cast member	Seasons on TVP 2		
cast member	1	2	3
Maciej Kurzajewski			
Tatiana Okupnik			
Justyna Steczkowska			
Włodzimierz Szaranowicz			
Doda			
Igor Kryszyłowicz			
Maria Zuchowicz			
Tomasz Jacyków			
Renata Aleksander			
Rafał Mroczek			
Katarina Witt			

=== Judges ===
Lineup of judges by seat order
Season	Year	Judges			
Season	Year	1	2	3	4
1	Fall 2007	Włodzimierz	Doda	Igor	Maria
2	Spring 2008	Włodzimierz	Doda	Igor	Maria
3	Fall 2008	Włodzimierz	Doda	Tomasz	Renata

== Special ==
On December 14, 2007 TVP2 aired a special episode of Gwiazdy tańczą na lodzie – Christmas Dancing on the Ice.

	Song
Ewelina Serafin & Michał Więcek	"Feliz Navidad" – José Feliciano
Beata Sadowska i Sławomir Janicki	"All I Want For Christmas Is You" – Mariah Carey
Jarosław Kret & Sherri Kennedy	"Pada śnieg'" – Edyta Górniak & Krzysztof Antkowiak
Ewa Sonnet & Łukasz Jóźwiak	"Winter Wonderland" – Macy Gray
Zygmunt Chajzer & Aleksandra Kauc	"Santa Claus Is Coming to Town"
Marysia Sadowska & Roger Lubicz-Sawicki	"Do They Know it's Christmas?" – Band Aid
Piotr Zelt & Agnieszka Dulej	"Driving Home for Christmas" – Chris Rea
Anna Popek & Filip Bernadowski	"Jest taki dzień – Andrzej Piaseczny
Katarzyna Glinka & Łukasz Dzióbek	"Z kopyta kulig rwie" – Brathanki
Rafał Mroczek & Aneta Kowalska	"Merry Christmas Everyone" – Shakin' Stevens
Olga Borys & Sławomir Borowiecki	"Rudolph the Red-Nosed Reindeer"
Tatiana Okupnik & White Stars	"Last Christmas" – Wham!
Dorota Rabczewska & White Stars	"Cicha Noc"
Couples from 1st Season	"Happy Xmas (War Is Over)" – John Lennon & Yoko Ono

== Couples ==
Dancer	I	II	III
Filip Bernadowski	Anna Popek	Karolina Nowakowska	Katarzyna Zielińska
Sławomir Borowiecki	Olga Borys	Aleksandra Szwed	–
Radek Dostál	–	Małgorzata Pieczyńska	Beata Ścibakówna
Łukasz Dzióbek	Katarzyna Glinka	Katarzyna Pietras	Jolanta Rutowicz
Sławomir Janicki	Beata Sadowska	–	–
Łukasz Jóźwiak	Ewa Sonnet	Weronika Książkiewicz	Agnieszka Włodarczyk
Nicholas Keagen	–	–	Gosia Andrzejewicz
Maciej Lewandowski	Christina Bien	Aneta Florczyk	–
Roger Lubicz-Sawicki	Maria Sadowska	–	Katarzyna Burzyńska
Jan Luggenhölscher	–	–	Karolina Malinowska
Michał Więcek	Ewelina Serafin	–	–
Agnieszka Dulej-Urbańska	Piotr Zelt	Robert Rozmus	Samuel Palmer
Aleksandra Kauc	Zygmunt Chajzer	Marek Kościkiewicz	–
Sherri Kennedy	Jarosław Kret	Robert Moskwa	–
Magdalena Komorowska	–	Marcin Krawczyk	Conrado Moreno
Aneta Kowalska	Rafał Mroczek	–	–
Michaela Krutská	Przemysław Babiarz	–	Michał Milowicz
Agata Rosłońska	Przemysław Saleta	Tomasz Iwan	Paweł Konnak
Elena Sokolova	–	Marcin Rój	Rafał Cieszyński

== Perfect 20's (10.0+10.0) ==
Celebrity	Season	Episode	Songs
Katarzyna Glinka & Łukasz Dzióbek	1	9	"Knockin' on Heaven's Door" "Cheri, Cheri Lady"
Rafał Mroczek & Aneta Kowalska	1	11	"Everybody (Backstreet's Back)" "Znak Pokoju"
Olga Borys & Sławomir Borowiecki	1	11	"Ta ostatnia niedziela" "Szansa"

== Perfect 30's (10.0+10.0+10.0) ==
Celebrity	Season	Episode	Songs
Samuel Palmer & Agnieszka Dulej-Urbańska	3	11	"I Like to Move It" "You Raise Me Up"
Agnieszka Włodarczyk & Łukasz Jóźwiak	3	11	"The Voice"

== Average Scores of All Couples ==
Those in bold are couples who won the competition.

Rank by average	Place	Couple	Perfect 10.0s	Total	Number of vote dances	Season	Average
1	2nd	Rafał Mroczek & Aneta Kowalska	5	142.5	15	1	9.5
2	**1st**	**Aleksandra Szwed & Sławomir Borowiecki**	2	131	14	2	9.35
3	**1st**	**Olga Borys & Sławomir Borowiecki**	5	139.5	15	1	9.3
4	3rd	Katarzyna Glinka & Łukasz Dzióbek	3	111	12	1	9.25
5	**1st**	**Samuel Palmer & Agnieszka Dulej-Urbańska**	5	151.6	17	3	8.91
6	8th	Maria Sadowska & Roger Lubicz-Sawicki	0	34.6	4	1	8.65
7	2nd	Agnieszka Włodarczyk & Łukasz Jóźwiak	3	146.4	17	3	8.61
8	6th	Piotr Zelt & Agnieszka Dulej-Urbańska	0	59.9	7	1	8.55
9	4th	Anna Popek & Filip Bernadowski	0	82.5	10	1	8.25
10	4th	Robert Moskwa & Sherri Kennedy	0	96.7	12	2	8.05
11	3rd	Aneta Florczyk & Maciej Lewandowski	0	111.4	14	2	7.95
12	5th	Weronika Książkiewicz & Łukasz Jóźwiak	0	78.3	10	2	7.83
13	4th	Beata Ścibakówna & Radek Dostál	0	93.8	12	3	7.81
14	9th	Zygmunt Chajzer & Aleksandra Kauc	0	23.3	3	1	7.76
15	7th	Tomasz Iwan & Agata Rosłońska	0	46.5	6	2	7.75
16	6th	Karolina Nowakowska & Filip Bernadowski	0	61.4	8	2	7.67
17	2nd	Marcin Krawczyk & Magdalena Komorowska	0	106	14	2	7.57
18	12th	Beata Sadowska & Sławomir Janicki	0	7.5	1	1	7.5
19	3rd	Katarzyna Zielińska & Filip Bernadowski	0	102.5	14	3	7.32
20	5th	Michał Milowicz & Michaela Krutská	0	72.8	10	3	7.28
21	9th	Robert Rozmus & Agnieszka Dulej-Urbańska	0	28.6	4	2	7.15
22	7th	Przemysław Babiarz & Michaela Krutská	0	35.3	5	1	7.06
23	8th	Małgorzata Pieczyńska & Radek Dostál	0	34.4	5	2	6.88
24	6th	Rafał Cieszyński & Elena Sokolova	0	54	8	3	6.75
25	10th	Ewa Sonnet & Łukasz Jóźwiak	0	13.1	2	1	6.55
26	11th	Marek Kościkiewicz & Aleksandra Kauc	0	13.0	2	2	6.5
27	7th	Gosia Andrzejewicz & Nicholas Keagen	0	36.5	6	3	6.08
28	10th	Katarzyna Pietras & Łukasz Dzióbek	0	18.1	3	2	6.03
29	9th	Katarzyna Burzyńska & Roger Lubicz-Sawicki	0	23.8	4	3	5.98
30	10th	Conrado Moreno & Magdalena Komorowska	0	11.3	2	3	5.65
31	8th	Paweł Konnak & Agata Rosłońska	0	25.7	5	3	5.14
32	12th	Marcin Rój & Elena Sokołowa	0	5.0	1	2	5.0
33	13th	Christina Bien & Maciej Lewandowski	0	4.8	1	1	4.8
34	5th	Przemysław Saleta & Agata Rosłońska	0	38	8	1	4.75
35	11th	Jarosław Kret & Sherri Kennedy	0	4.5	1	1	4.5
36	14th	Ewelina Serafin & Michał Więcej	0	4.5	1	1	4.5
37	12th	Karolina Malinowska & Jan Luggenhölscher	0	4.3	1	3	4.3
38	11th	Jolanta Rutowicz & Łukasz Dzióbek	0	5.3	2	3	2.65
Rank by average	Place	Couple	Perfect 10.0s	Total	Number of vote dances	Season	Average

== See also ==
- Taniec z Gwiazdami
