= Dancing on Ice (German TV series) season 4 =

Dancing on Ice
- Season 4
- Celebrity winner: Sarah Lombardi
- Professional winner: Joti Polizoakis
- No. of episodes: 6

Release
- Original network: Sat.1
- Original release: 6 January – 10 February 2019

Season chronology
- Next → Season 5

The fourth season of Dancing on Ice began airing on 6 January 2019 and ended on 10 February 2019 on Sat.1.

The series will once again be filmed in the Magic Media Company Coloneum at Ossendorf in Köln, which was set up for the first series.

Daniel Boschmann and Marlene Lufen are the hosts, replacing Oliver Petzokat and Katarina Witt.

Daniel Weiss is returning for his third series as a judge, with the new judges Katarina Witt, Judith Williams and Cale Kalay, replacing Kati Winkler and Reinhold Mirmseker.

The competition was won by Sarah Lombardi with professional partner Joti Polizoakis.

== Couples ==
Celebrity	Known for	Professional partner	Status
Désirée Nick	actress & comedian & author	Alexander Gazsi	Eliminated 1st on 6 January 2019
Kevin Kuske	Bobsleigh	Myriam Leuenberger	Eliminated 2nd on 20 January 2019
Detlef Soost	dancer & choreographer	Katharina "Kat" Rybkowski	Eliminated 3rd on 27 January 2019
Timur Bartels	Actor	Amani Fancy	Withdrew on 3 February 2019
Aleksandra Bechtel	television presenter	Matti Landgraf	Eliminated 4th on 3 February 2019
Sarina Nowak	Curvy-Model	David Vincour	Third place on 10 February 2019
John Michael Kelly	Musician	Annette Dytrt	Runner-up on 10 February 2019
Sarah Lombardi	Singer & Deutschland sucht den Superstar runner-up	Joti Polizoakis	Winner on 10 February 2019

== Scoring chart ==
Couple	Place	1	2	3	4	5	6
Sarah & Joti	1	34.0	33.0	—	37.5	38.5	40.0+40.0=80.0
John & Annette	2	31.0	27.5	31.0	23.0	29.0	35.0+37.5=72.5
Sarina & David	3	21.0	27.0	24.0	24.0	31.5	35.0+37.0=72.0
Aleksandra & Matti	4	18.0	26.0	23.5	27.0	33.5	
Timur & Amani	5	35.5	36.0	33.5	32.5	—	
Detlef & Kat	6	22.5	30.5	20.0	25.5		
Kevin & Myriam	7	26.5	19.5	22.5			
Désirée & Alexander	8	22.5					

indicates the couple eliminated that week
indicates the couple were in the skate-off but not eliminated
indicates the couple was eliminated but later returned to the competition.
indicates the couple withdrew from the competition
indicates the winning couple
indicates the runner-up couple
indicates the third-place couple
Green scores indicate the highest score for that week
Red scores indicate the lowest score for that week
"—" indicates the couple(s) that did not skate that week

=== Average chart ===
This table only counts for dances scored on a traditional 40-point scale.

Rank by average	Place	Couple	Total	Number of dances	Average
1	1	Sarah & Joti	223.0	6	37.1
2	5	Timur & Amani	137.5	4	34.4
3	2	John & Annette	214.0	7	30.6
4	3	Sarina & David	199.5	7	28.5
5	4	Aleksandra & Matti	128.0	5	25.6
6	6	Detlef & Kat	98.5	4	24.6
7	7	Kevin & Myriam	68.5	3	22.8
8	8	Désirée & Alexander	22.5	1	22.5

== Live show details ==
=== Week 1 (6 January) ===
- Group performance: Holiday on Ice

Order	Couple	Judges' scores				Total	Scoreboard	Song	Result
Order	Couple	Daniel	Katarina	Judith	Cale	Total	Scoreboard	Song	Result
1	Detlef & Kat	5.0	5.5	6.0	6.0	22.5	=5th	"Échame la Culpa"—Luis Fonsi & Demi Lovato	Safe
2	Sarina & David	4.5	5.0	6.0	5.5	21.0	7th	"California Gurls"—Katy Perry & Snoop Dogg	Bottom Two
3	Aleksandra & Matti	4.0	4.5	5.0	4.5	18.0	8th	"Katchi"—Ofenbach & Nick Waterhouse	Safe
4	Sarah & Joti	8.0	8.5	8.5	9.0	34.0	2nd	"Fallin'"—Alicia Keys	Safe
5	Kevin & Myriam	6.5	6.5	7.0	6.5	26.5	4th	"Wake Me Up Before You Go-Go"—Wham!	Safe
6	Désirée & Alexander	4.5	5.5	6.5	6.0	22.5	=5th	"Get Here"—Brenda Russell	Eliminated
7	Timur & Amani	8.5	9.0	9.0	9.0	35.5	1st	"Sorry"—Justin Bieber	Safe
8	John & Annette	7.0	8.0	8.0	8.0	31.0	3rd	"Who'll Come With Me"—The Kelly Family	Safe

Save Me skates

1. Sarina & David: "(You Make Me Feel Like) A Natural Woman"—Aretha Franklin
2. Désirée & Alexander: "Sign of the Times"—Harry Styles

Judges' voted to save

- Sarina & David

=== Week 2 (13 January) ===
- Group performance: "Came Here for Love"—Sigala & Ella Eyre (performed by Holiday on Ice & Contestant)

Order	Couple	Judges' scores				Total	Scoreboard	Song	Result
Order	Couple	Daniel	Katarina	Judith	Cale	Total	Scoreboard	Song	Result
1	Kevin & Myriam	4.5	5.0	5.5	4.5	19.5	7th	"Legendary"—Welshly Arms	Bottom Two
2	Timur & Amani	9.0	9.0	9.0	9.0	36.0	1st	"Flames"—David Guetta & Sia	Safe
3	Sarina & David	6.5	7.0	7.0	6.5	27.0	5th	"She's Like the Wind"—Patrick Swayze	Safe
4	John & Annette	6.5	7.5	7.0	6.5	27.5	4th	"I Don't Want to Miss a Thing"—Aerosmith	Safe
5	Detlef & Kat	7.5	8.0	8.0	7.0	30.5	3rd	"Zusammen"—Die Fantastischen Vier ft. Clueso	Safe
6	Aleksandra & Matti	5.0	6.0	8.5	6.5	26.0	6th	"She's the One"—Robbie Williams	Eliminated
7	Sarah & Joti	7.0	8.5	9.0	8.5	33.0	2nd	"Break Free"—Ariana Grande ft. Zedd	Safe

Save Me skates

1. Aleksandra & Matti: "Chasing Cars"—Snow Patrol
2. Kevin & Myriam: "Too Good at Goodbyes"—Sam Smith

Judges' voted to save

- Kevin & Myriam

=== Week 3 (20 January) ===
- Group performance: "I Wanna Dance with Somebody"—Whitney Houston (performed by Holiday on Ice & Contestant)

Due to an injury, Sarah & Joti will not compete in the live show.
Aleksandra & Matti returned to the competition.

Order	Couple	Judges' scores				Total	Scoreboard	Song	Result
Order	Couple	Daniel	Katarina	Judith	Cale	Total	Scoreboard	Song	Result
1	Sarina & David	5.5	6.0	6.5	6.0	24.0	3rd	"Material Girl"—Madonna	Bottom two
2	John & Annette	7.5	7.5	8.5	7.5	31.0	2nd	"Major Tom (völlig losgelöst)"—Peter Schilling	Safe
3	Timur & Amani	8.0	8.5	9.0	8.0	33.5	1st	True Colors"—Cyndi Lauper	Safe
4	Kevin & Myriam	5.0	5.5	6.5	5.5	22.5	5th	(I've Had) The Time of My Life"—Bill Medley & Jennifer Warnes	Eliminated
5	Aleksandra & Matti	4.5	6.5	6.5	6.0	23.5	4th	Flashdance... What a Feeling"—Irene Cara	Safe
6	Detlef & Kat	3.0	5.5	6.0	5.5	20.0	6th	Purple Rain"—Prince & The Revolution	Safe
N/A*	Sarah & Joti	N/A*	N/A*	N/A*	N/A*	N/A*	N/A*	N/A*	Given bye

Save Me skates

1. Sarina & David: "(You Make Me Feel Like) A Natural Woman"—Aretha Franklin
2. Kevin & Myriam: "Too Good at Goodbyes"—Sam Smith

Judges' voted to save

- Sarina & David

=== Week 4 (27 January) ===
- Group performance: "This Is Me"—Keala Settle (performed by Contestant)

Order	Couple	Judges' scores				Total	Scoreboard	Song	Result
Order	Couple	Daniel	Katarina	Judith	Cale	Total	Scoreboard	Song	Result
1	Detlef & Kat	5.5	6.0	7.5	6.5	25.5	4th	Swan Lake	Eliminated
2	Aleksandra & Matti	6.5	7.0	7.5	6.0	27.0	3rd	"What About Us"—Pink	Bottom two
3	Timur & Amani	8.5	8.0	8.5	7.5	32.5	2nd	"Wannabe"—Spice Girls	Safe
4	Sarina & David	4.5	6.5	7.5	5.5	24.0	5th	"Love Me like You Do"—Ellie Goulding	Safe
5	Sarah & Joti	9.5	9.5	9.5	9.0	37.5	1st	"Wie schön du bist"—Sarah Connor	Safe
6	John & Annette	4.5	5.5	8.0	5.0	23.0	6th	"There's Nothing Holdin' Me Back"—Shawn Mendes	Safe

Save Me skates

1. Aleksandra & Matti: "Chasing Cars"—Snow Patrol
2. Detlef & Kat: "Don't Stop 'Til You Get Enough"—Michael Jackson

Judges' voted to save

- Aleksandra & Matti

=== Week 5: Semi-final (3 February) ===
- Group performance: Aljona Savchenko & Bruno Massot

Timur Bartels had to withdraw from the show because of family issue.

Order	Couple	Judges' scores				Total	Scoreboard	Song	Result
Order	Couple	Daniel	Katarina	Judith	Cale	Total	Scoreboard	Song	Result
1	John & Annette	7.5	7.5	7.0	7.0	29.0	4th	"María"—Ricky Martin	Safe
2	Aleksandra & Matti	8.5	9.0	8.0	8.0	33.5	2nd	"Paradise City"—Guns N' Roses	Eliminated
3	Sarina & David	8.0	8.5	8.0	7.0	31.5	3rd	"Bad Romance"—Lady Gaga	Bottom two
4	Sarah & Joti	9.5	9.5	10.0	9.5	38.5	1st	"Beat It"—Michael Jackson	Safe
N/A*	Timur & Amani	N/A*	N/A*	N/A*	N/A*	N/A*	N/A*	N/A*	Withdrew

Save Me skates

1. Aleksandra & Matti: "Happy"—Pharrell Williams
2. Sarina & David:"Havana"—Camila Cabello & Young Thug

Judges' voted to save

- Sarina & David

=== Week 6: Final (10 February) ===
- Group performance: "I'm a Survivor"—Reba McEntire (performed by Wesley Campbell & Finalists) / "Sax"—Fleur East (performed by Holiday on Ice & Finalists)

Order	Couple	Judges' scores				Total	Grand total	Scoreboard	Song	Result
Order	Couple	Daniel	Katarina	Judith	Cale	Total	Grand total	Scoreboard	Song	Result
1	Sarah & Joti	10.0	10.0	10.0	10.0	40.0	80.0	1st	"Let's Get Loud"—Jennifer Lopez	Winner
6	Sarah & Joti	10.0	10.0	10.0	10.0	40.0	80.0	1st	"I Have Nothing"—Whitney Houston	Winner
2	John & Annette	9.0	9.0	9.0	8.0	35.0	72.5	2nd	"Shallow"—Lady Gaga & Bradley Cooper	Runner-up
4	John & Annette	9.5	9.5	10.0	8.5	37.5	72.5	2nd	"I'm So Excited"—The Pointer Sisters	Runner-up
3	Sarina & David	7.5	9.5	9.5	8.5	35.0	72.0	3rd	"A Whole New World"—Brad Kane & Lea Salonga	Third place
5	Sarina & David	9.0	9.0	10.0	9.0	37.0	72.0	3rd	"Achterbahn"—Helene Fischer	Third place
