= Alinur Velidedeoğlu =

Turkish advertiser (1953-2026)

- Born: 1953; Ann Arbor, Michigan
- Died: March 2026 (aged 72–73)
- Citizenship: Turkey, United States
- Known for: Advertising, personal life
- Relatives: Hıfzı Veldet Velidedeoğlu

Alinur Velidedeoğlu (1953 – March 2026) was a Turkish-American creative artist, advertising executive, film producer, and media personality. He is mostly known in Turkey as the creator of television commercials. He is the recipient of a Cresta Award for his advertising work for the clothing company David People.

== Biography ==
Velidedeoğlu was born in Ann Arbor, Michigan, in 1953. He is the grandson of Turkish law professor Hıfzı Veldet Velidedeoğlu.

He died in March 2026 due to heart failure.

== Career ==
Velidedeoglu began his career in the animation department of İstanbul Reklam while studying Graphic Design at Marmara University. At 18, he directed his first commercial. In 1977, Velidedeoğlu founded Gratel and later became a partner in prominent firms like Güzel Sanatlar Reklamcılık (1981) and Saatchi & Saatchi (1985). He also held shares in Zenith Medya. He directed numerous television commercials and composed jingles. In addition to the Cresta Award, his work earned him several international awards, including Cannes Lions, London International, and NY International, according to his personal website. His work was featured in Discovery Channel and NBC.

In 2007, Alinur Velidedeoğlu was in charge of the Republican People's Party's (CHP) election campaign strategy for the 2007 Turkish general election as part of the Güzel Sanatlar-Saatchi & Saatchi advertising agency. Alongside Yiğit Şardan, he supported a marketing-based approach that treated voters as consumers and aimed to appeal to their emotions. The campaign focused on establishing CHP as a strong political brand, incorporating the image of Atatürk while emphasizing republican values and Turkey's modernization journey.

Velidedeoğlu is also known as a producer with his films such as The Ottoman Lieutenant (2017), Harvard Man (2001), and "Black & White" (1999).

== Media and public presence ==
During the 1999 Cannes Film Festival, Alinur Velidedeoğlu met by chance Billy Hayes, whose story about his life in a Turkish prison after his arrest for hashish smuggling inspired the hit film Midnight Express. Velidedeoğlu made an interview with Billy Hayes, in which Hayes expressed his disappointment with the film adaptation. He made the video available on YouTube, after being unable to broadcast it on Western television. The interview attracted significant attention in the Turkish media.

Following the 2003 HSBC bombing in Istanbul, a large gold ring engraved with Alinur Velidedeoğlu's name was found among the victims' belongings, causing initial confusion. It was later revealed that the ring was created as part of an art exhibition held by Velidedeoğlu. He had asked his assistant, Gaye Zeytinci, to engrave his name inside the oversized ring, which symbolized the letter "O" in the word "love" on one of his paintings. The ring was ultimately not used in the exhibition and was given to Zeytinci's mother, Gültaç Zeytinci, who later happened to be one of the victims of the attack.

In 2007, Velidedeoglu served as a judge on the competition show Buzda Dans, which is the Turkish version of Dancing on Ice. His participation received some criticism, including remarks from TV critic Togay Bayatlı, who questioned his expertise in ice skating and dance while acknowledging their personal friendship. Bayatlı also pointed out Velidedeoğlu's business association with the show's producer and noted reports that his fiancée was involved in costume design for the program.

In 2017, Enci Velidedeoğlu, his spouse at the time, filed for divorce from Alinur Velidedeoğlu, citing infidelity and other serious allegations. According to her lawsuit at the Istanbul Family Court, the couple married in 2007 despite her family's objections. She later discovered that Alinur Velidedeoğlu had affairs while in the U.S., including with his former girlfriends and his secretary, with whom he allegedly rented a $25,000-per-month mansion. She also claimed to have found performance-enhancing drugs and firearms in their home safe.

In the same year, Alinur Velidedeoğlu sparked debate with his criticism of young Turkish actors, stating that they had no chance in Hollywood due to shortcomings in their training and performance consistency. He argued that Turkish acting education was based on memorization rather than self-expression, and that many actors relied on exaggerated emotions rather than mastering subtle facial expressions. His remarks drew criticism, notably from actor Oktay Kaynarca, who accused advertisers like Velidedeoğlu of undervaluing Turkish talent while profiting from simplistic campaigns. Despite his criticisms, Velidedeoğlu acknowledged the talents of Selçuk Yöntem and Haluk Bilginer, stating that Bilginer's acting skills were highly regarded internationally.
