= Dancing on Ice (German TV series) season 5 =

Dancing on Ice
- Season 5
- Celebrity winner: Eric Stehfest
- Professional winner: Amani Fancy
- No. of episodes: 6

Release
- Original network: Sat.1
- Original release: 15 November – 20 December 2019

Season chronology
- ← Previous; Season 4

The fifth season of Dancing on Ice began airing on 15 November 2019 and ended on 20 December 2019 on Sat.1.

The series was once again filmed in the Magic Media Company Coloneum at Ossendorf in Köln, which was set up for the first and fourth series.

Daniel Boschmann and Marlene Lufen both returned for their second season as hosts.

Daniel Weiss was returned for his fourth series as a judge, as well as Katarina Witt and Judith Williams were returned for their second series, Cale Kalay was not returned this year on Ice panel.

The competition was won by Eric Stehfest with professional partner Amani Fancy.

== Couples ==
On October 10, 2019, Sat.1 announced the 10 couples for this year.

Celebrity	Known for	Professional partner	Status
Jens Hilbert	Entrepreneur	Sabrina Cappellini	Eliminated 1st on 17 November 2019
Nadine Klein	Influencer & contestant on Der Bachelor 2018 & Die Bachelorette 2018	Niko Ulanovsky	Eliminated 2nd on 22 November 2019
Jenny Elvers	Actress	Jamal Othman	Eliminated 3rd on 29 November 2019
Klaudia Giez	Contestant on 13th season of Germany's Next Topmodel	Sevan Lerche	Eliminated 5th on 29 November 2019
Peer Kusmagk	Actor & Host	Katharina "Kat" Rybkowski	Eliminated 6th on 6 December 2019
Nadine Angerer	German footballer	David Vincour	Eliminated 7th on 13 December 2019
André Hamann	Model	Stina Martini	Eliminated 8th on 13 December 2019
Lina Larissa Strahl	singer-songwriter & actress	Joti Polizoakis	Third place on 20 December 2019
Joey Heindle	Singer & 5th place in season 9 of Deutschland sucht den Superstar	Ramona Elsener	Runner-up on 20 December 2019
Eric Stehfest	Actor	Amani Fancy	Winner on 20 December 2019

== Scoring chart ==
Couple	Place	1		2	3	4	5	6
Couple	Place	a	b	2	3	4	5	6
Eric & Amani	1	—	23.0	14.5	25.0	30.0	27.5	30.0+30.0=60.0
Joey & Ramona	2	—	18.0	19.5	23.5	21.0	27.5	27.5+30.0=57.5
Lina & Joti	3	—	21.5	18.5	27.5	21.0	26.5	29.5+29.5=59.0
André & Stina	4	18.0	—	20.0	18.5	27.0	26.5	
Nadine A. & David	5	—	14.5	17.5	21.0	19.0	21.0	
Peer & Katharina	6	13.5	—	14.5	18.5	17.0		
Klaudia & Sevan	7	19.0	–	19.0	20.5			
Jenny & Jamal	8	11.0	—	11.5	14.5			
Nadine K. & Niko	9	18.0	—	15.5				
Jens & Sabrina	10	—	12.5					

indicates the couple eliminated that week
indicates the couple were in the skate-off but not eliminated
indicates the winning couple
indicates the runner-up couple
indicates the third-place couple
Green scores indicate the highest score for that week
Red scores indicate the lowest score for that week
"—" indicates the couple(s) that did not skate that week

=== Average chart ===
This table only counts for dances scored on a traditional 30-point scale.

Rank by average	Place	Couple	Total	Number of dances	Average
1	1	Eric & Amani	180.0	7	25.7
2	3	Lina & Joti	174.0	7	24.9
3	2	Joey & Ramona	167.0	7	23.9
4	4	André & Stina	110.0	5	22.0
5	7	Klaudia & Sevan	58.5	3	19.5
6	5	Nadine A. & David	94.0	5	18.8
7	9	Nadine K. & Niko	33.5	2	16.8
8	6	Peer & Katharina	63.5	4	15.9
9	10	Jens & Sabrina	12.5	1	12.5
10	8	Jenny & Jamal	37.0	3	12.3

== Live show details ==
=== Week 1 (15/17 November) ===
==== 15 November ====
The couple with the lowest votes from Live 1 will compete against the couple with the lowest votes from Live 2 in the skate-off on 17 November.

Order	Couple	Judges' scores			Total	Scoreboard	Song	Result
Order	Couple	Daniel	Katarina	Judith	Total	Scoreboard	Song	Result
1	Peer & Katharina	4.5	4.5	4.5	13.5	4th	"Let Me Entertain You"–Robbie Williams	In skate-off
2	Nadine K. & Niko	6.0	6.0	6.0	18.0	=2nd	"Señorita"–Shawn Mendes & Camila Cabello	Safe
3	Klaudia & Sevan	6.0	6.5	6.5	19.0	1st	"Sweet but Psycho"–Ava Max	Safe
4	André & Stina	6.5	5.5	6.0	18.0	=2nd	"Sex on Fire"–Kings of Leon	Safe
5	Jenny & Jamal	2.5	4.0	4.5	11.0	5th	"Girl on Fire"–Alicia Keys	Safe

==== 17 November ====
The couple with the lowest votes from live will compete against the couple with the lowest votes from Live 1 (Peer & Katharina) in the skate-off.

Order	Couple	Judges' scores			Total	Scoreboard	Song	Result
Order	Couple	Daniel	Katarina	Judith	Total	Scoreboard	Song	Result
1	Joey & Ramona	5.5	6.0	6.5	18.0	3rd	""Perfect Duet" version"–Ed Sheeran & Beyoncé	Safe
2	Lina & Joti	7.0	7.0	7.5	21.5	2nd	"Shake It Off"–Taylor Swift	Safe
3	Nadine A. & David	5.0	4.5	5.0	14.5	4th	"Eye of the Tiger"–Survivor	Safe
4	Jens & Sabrina	3.5	4.5	4.5	12.5	5th	"Everybody (Backstreet's Back)–Backstreet Boys	In skate-off
5	Eric & Amani	7.5	7.5	8.0	23.0	1st	"Someone You Loved"–Lewis Capaldi	Safe

Save Me skates

1. Peer & Katharina: "Forever Young"–Alphaville
2. Jens & Sabrina: "Diamonds"–Rihanna

Judges' voted to save

- Peer & Katharina

=== Week 2 (22 November) ===
Order	Couple	Judges' scores			Total	Scoreboard	Song	Result
Order	Couple	Daniel	Katarina	Judith	Total	Scoreboard	Song	Result
1	Nadine K. & Niko	4.5	5.5	5.5	15.5	6th	"Don't Cha"–The Pussycat Dolls ft. Busta Rhymes	Eliminated
2	Joey & Ramona	6.0	6.5	7.0	19.5	2nd	"She Got Me"–Luca Hänni	Safe
3	Klaudia & Sevan	6.5	6.0	6.5	19.0	3rd	"My Immortal"–Evanescence	Safe
4	André & Stina	7.0	6.0	7.0	20.0	1st	"Candyman"–Christina Aguilera	Bottom Two
5	Lina & Joti	6.0	5.5	7.0	18.5	4th	"HYPE"–Lina Larissa Strahl	Safe
6	Peer & Katharina	4.0	5.0	5.5	14.5	=7th	"Bitter Sweet Symphony"–The Verve	Safe
7	Nadine A. & David	5.0	7.0	5.5	17.5	5th	"I Kissed a Girl"–Katy Perry	Safe
8	Eric & Amani	4.5	4.5	5.5	14.5	=7th	"Carmen Suite"–Rodion Shchedrin	Safe
9	Jenny & Jamal	3.0	3.5	5.0	11.5	9th	"Ich gehör nur mir"–Elisabeth	Safe

Save Me skates

1. Nadine K. & Niko: "Skinny Love"–Birdy
2. André & Stina: "Uptown Funk"–Mark Ronson ft. Bruno Mars

Judges' voted to save

- André & Stina

=== Week 3 (29 November) ===
Order	Couple	Judges' scores			Total	Scoreboard	Song	Result
Order	Couple	Daniel	Katarina	Judith	Total	Scoreboard	Song	Result
1	Eric & Amani	9.0	8.0	8.0	25.0	2nd	"Livin' la Vida Loca"–Ricky Martin	Safe
2	Jenny & Jamal	4.5	5.0	5.0	14.5	8th	"Like a Virgin"–Madonna	Eliminated
3	André & Stina	5.5	5.5	7.5	18.5	=6th	"I Will Always Love You"–Whitney Houston	Safe
4	Klaudia & Sevan	7.0	6.5	7.0	20.5	5th	"99 Luftballons"–Nena	Eliminated
5	Peer & Katharina	6.5	6.0	6.0	18.5	=6th	"Thunderstruck"–AC/DC	Bottom three
6	Nadine A. & David	7.0	7.5	6.5	21.0	4th	"Bed of Roses"–Bon Jovi	Safe
7	Joey & Ramona	7.5	8.5	7.5	23.5	3rd	"Barbie Girl"–Aqua	Safe
8	Lina & Joti	9.5	9.0	9.0	27.5	1st	"Total Eclipse of the Heart"–Bonnie Tyler	Safe

Save Me skates

1. Peer & Katharina: "Forever Young"–Alphaville
2. Jenny & Jamal: "Black Velvet"–Alannah Myles
3. Klaudia & Sevan: "I Will Survive"–Gloria Gaynor

Judges' voted to save

- Peer & Katharina

=== Week 4 (6 December) ===
- Theme: Christmas

Order	Couple	Judges' scores			Total	Scoreboard	Song	Result
Order	Couple	Daniel	Katarina	Judith	Total	Scoreboard	Song	Result
1	Joey & Ramona	7.0	7.0	7.0	21.0	=3rd	melody	Safe
2	Lina & Joti	6.5	6.5	8.0	21.0	=3rd	"Ave Maria"–Maria Callas	Safe
3	André & Stina	9.0	9.0	9.0	27.0	2nd	"All I Want for Christmas Is You"–Mariah Carey	Safe
4	Peer & Katharina	4.0	7.0	6.0	17.0	6th	"Jingle Bell Rock"–Bobby Helms	Eliminated
5	Eric & Amani	10.0	10.0	10.0	30.0	1st	"The Power of Love"–Frankie Goes to Hollywood	Safe
6	Nadine A. & David	5.5	7.5	6.0	19.0	5th	"Last Christmas"–Wham!	Bottom two

Save Me skates

1. Nadine A. & David: "Try"–Pink
2. Peer & Katharina: "Apologize"–OneRepublic

Judges' voted to save

- Nadine A. & David

=== Week 5: Semi-final (13 December) ===
Order	Couple	Judges' scores			Total	Scoreboard	Song	Result
Order	Couple	Daniel	Katarina	Judith	Total	Scoreboard	Song	Result
1	André & Stina	9.0	9.0	8.5	26.5	=3rd	"Let It Go"–Idina Menzel	Eliminated
2	Nadine A. & David	6.5	7.0	7.5	21.0	5th	"Walking on Sunshine"–Katrina and the Waves	Eliminated
3	Joey & Ramona	9.0	9.5	9.0	27.5	=1st	"It Must Have Been Love"–Roxette	Safe
4	Lina & Joti	8.5	8.5	9.5	26.5	=3rd	"Herzbeben"–Helene Fischer	Bottom three
5	Eric & Amani	9.0	9.0	9.5	27.5	=1st	"Always Remember Us This Way"–Lady Gaga	Safe

Save Me skates

1. Nadine A. & David: "Try"–Pink
2. André & Stina: "Uptown Funk"–Mark Ronson ft. Bruno Mars
3. Lina & Joti: "Young and Beautiful"–Lana Del Rey

Judges' voted to save

- Lina & Joti

=== Week 6: Final (20 December) ===
Order	Couple	Judges' scores			Total	Grand total	Scoreboard	Song	Result
Order	Couple	Daniel	Katarina	Judith	Total	Grand total	Scoreboard	Song	Result
1	Joey & Ramona	9.0	9.0	9.5	27.5	57.5	3rd	"I Wanna Dance with Somebody (Who Loves Me)"–Whitney Houston	Runner-up
4	Joey & Ramona	10.0	10.0	10.0	30.0	57.5	3rd	"Hallelujah"–Leonard Cohen	Runner-up
2	Eric & Amani	10.0	10.0	10.0	30.0	60.0	1st	"Someone like You"–Adele	Winner
6	Eric & Amani	10.0	10.0	10.0	30.0	60.0	1st	"Can't Stop the Feeling!–Justin Timberlake	Winner
3	Lina & Joti	10.0	9.5	10.0	29.5	59.0	2nd	"Do You Love Me"–The Contours	Third place
5	Lina & Joti	9.5	10.0	10.0	29.5	59.0	2nd	"This Is Me"–Keala Settle	Third place
