= ...I R'n'B =

Single by Ewa Sonnet

from the album Nielegalna
- Released: July 2005
- Recorded: 2005
- Genre: Pop, dance-pop, contemporary R&B
- Length: 9:57
- Label: IFactory Sp. z o.o.
- Producer(s): Robert Janson

Ewa Sonnet singles chronology
"...I R'n'B" (2005)	"Nie zatrzymasz mnie" (2006)

...I R'n'b (English: ...And R'n'B) is the debut single by adult model and singer Ewa Sonnet. The single was released in July 2005 and became a hit due to the accompanying music video by Swedish director Deevo von Brahust, who is known for directing music videos for musicians such as AC/DC, Roxette and Sabrina. The video's screenplay was written by Bo Martin. The single was produced by Robert Janson for the Aurolac Studio and mixed by Prince Charles Alexander at Quad Studios with mastering by Tom Coyne at Sterling Sound Studio. The accompanying video's main focus is the artist herself playing a lookalike coupled with a catchy beat.

== Track listing ==
CD
No.	Title	Length
1.	"...I R'n'B"	2:34
2.	"Niech Ta Noc Nie Kończy Się - Spit"	3:06
3.	"C'est la vie"	4:17

DVD
No.	Title	Length
1.	"...I R'n'B" (Video)

== Personnel ==
- Ewa Sonnet - vocals
- Paweł Marciniak - keyboards, guitar, bass
- Michał Marciniak - guitar
- Sławek Romanowski - percussion
