= Zeynep Tokuş =

Turkish actress (born 1977)

- Born: 1977 (age 48–49); Ankara, Turkey
- Occupation: Actress
- Years active: 1998–present
- Spouses: Bülent Helvacı (m. 2000; div. 2004) Alp Nuhoğlu (m. 2005; div. 2009) Erdem Yılmaztürk (m. 2011)
- Children: 3

Zeynep Tokuş (born 1977) is a Turkish actress and former beauty pageant winner. In 2007, she won the title on the Turkish version of the TV show Dancing on Ice.

== Biography ==
Tokuş was educated in graphic design at the Bilkent University in Ankara.

In 1998, she became the winner of the beauty contest of the newspaper Star, and received thereupon a role in the movie Deli Yürek.

In 2001, Tokuş was awarded the "Best Actress" for her role in the movie Yazgı.

On 11 March 2007, she won the title and a prize of TRY 100,000 in the Show TV show Buzda Dans (Dancing on Ice), after competing for ten weeks. Her partner was the American figure skater Robert Beauchamp, a former Holiday On Ice performer.

Zeynep Tokuş gave birth to her son Alp on 5 December 2001 in Canada.

== Filmography ==
Movies

- Vizontele – as Asiye (2000)
- Yazgı (2001)
- Vizontele Tuuba – as Asiye (2004)
- Doom of Love – as yoga instructor (2022)

TV series

- Deli Yürek – as Zeynep (1999)
- Kerem – as Sevil (1999)
- Çocuklar Duymasın – as Meltem (2002)
- Esir Şehrin İnsanları – as Nedime (2003)
- Bedel (2003)
- Hırçın Menekşe – as Deniz (2003)
- Çocuklar Ne Olacak (2004)
