= Michaela Krutská =

Czech pair skater

Personal information
- Born: 21 January 1985 (age 41)
- Height: 165 cm (5 ft 5 in)

Figure skating career
- Country: Czech Republic
- Skating club: Prague

Medal record
Czech Championships
Gold medal – first place	2001 Mladá Boleslav	Pairs
Silver medal – second place	2000 Mladá Boleslav	Pairs

Michaela Krutská (born 21 January 1985) is a Czech pair skater. With Marek Sedlmajer, she is the 2001 Ondrej Nepela Memorial bronze medalist and 2001 Czech national champion. The pair placed 11th at the 2001 European Championships in Bratislava, Slovakia. After retiring from competition, she began performing with Roger Lubicz-Sawicki in the Holiday on Ice show. She also appeared in two seasons of Gwiazdy tańczą na lodzie (the Polish version of Dancing on Ice) – partnering Przemysław Babiarz in season 1 and Michał Milowicz in season 3.

== Programs ==
(with Sedlmajer)

Season	Short program	Free skating
2000–2001	Rocky II by Bill Conti	Spartacus by Aram Khachaturian

== Competitive highlights ==
With Sedlmajer

International
Event	1999–2000	2000–2001	2001–2002
European Championships		11th	
Golden Spin of Zagreb		4th	
Ondrej Nepela Memorial			3rd
National
Czech Championships	2nd	1st	
