= Was es ist =

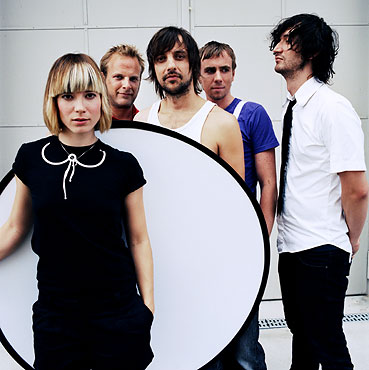

Single by MIA.

from the album Stille Post
- Released: 2003
- Genre: Pop
- Length: 4:17 min.
- Label: R.O.T. (production), Columbia (distribution)
- Songwriter(s): MIA.

"Was es ist" (What it is) is a song written and recorded by the German pop and rock band MIA., released in 2003 and later included on the album Stille Post. Although only reaching number 50 in the German charts, it caused a fierce controversy within German society because of its underlying patriotic message.

== Background ==
The song's theme is a positive interpretation of the German national identity re-awakening in a positive and tolerant way, thus allowing young Germans to identify with their country: "Fragt man mich jetzt, woher ich komme, / Tu ich mir nicht mehr selber leid" (If I am asked now where I'm from, / I no longer pity myself). The lyrics, based on a reference to Erich Fried's 1983 love poem of the same name, feature further romantic references to Germany and the colours of the German flag that are also represented by the band's black, red and gold dresses.

When the song was released on an EP of the same title in 2003, the band was heavily criticized for its patriotic tone which many considered inappropriate due to Germany's difficult history, culminating in accusations of promoting nationalism. MIA. claimed that the song was meant to provoke a discussion about Germany as a home and as a place to change and design; furthermore, they considered themselves politically on the left. The lead singer, Mieze Katz, who was even pelted with eggs, said about the topic: "This was grotesque for we aren't nationalists. I'm a leftist. But I have never fully understood the negation of the German national identity. I was born here, and German is the language I use to express myself. We must never forget the crimes, but this heritage is also a chance to build something good."

== See also ==
- German nationalism
