= Hıfzı Veldet Velidedeoğlu =

Hıfzı Veldet Velidedeoğlu (1904 – 1992) was a Turkish legal scholar, writer, and professor of civil law, known for his contributions to the development and interpretation of modern Turkish civil law following the legal reforms of the early years of the Republic of Turkey.

== Biography ==
Hıfzı Veldet Velidedeoğlu was born in 1904 in the late Ottoman Empire. He pursued his higher education in law during a period of major transformation, as the Ottoman legal system was being replaced by modern, European-inspired codes. He studied law in Istanbul and later continued his academic development in Europe, where he was influenced by continental legal traditions, particularly Swiss civil law.
