= Tuğba Ekinci =

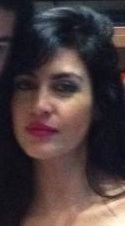

Background information
- Born: 9 June 1977 (age 49); Kars, Turkey
- Genres: Pop
- Occupation: Singer
- Years active: 2005–present
- Label: Seyhan Müzik

Tuğba Ekinci (born 9 June 1977) is a Turkish pop singer of Azerbaijani origin.

== Discography ==
=== Albums ===
- O Şimdi Asker (26 January 2005)
- Condom (14 April 2008)

=== EPs ===
- Yanma Demezler (16 July 2010)
- 100 Derece (3 August 2011)
- Hadi Kizim / Bi Kere Ara Be (25 September 2013)

=== Singles ===
- "Boynuz" (11 June 2007)
- "Para Babası" (5 September 2016)
- "Türkiye'nin Aslanları" (22 March 2018)
- "Son Dakika" (3 July 2020)
- "Bende Maske Yok" (28 May 2022)
- "Kahpe Kader" (28 July 2023)

=== As a featured artist ===
- "Bi' Gorsem" (feat. Tuğba Ekinci) – single (1 November 2011)
