= Filip Bernadowski =

Polish ice dancer

Personal information
- Full name: Filip Bernadowski
- Born: 20 June 1979 (age 47) Łódź, Poland
- Height: 1.76 m (5 ft 9 in)

Figure skating career
- Country: Poland
- Skating club: LTLF Łódź
- Retired: 2001

Filip Bernadowski (born 20 June 1979 in Łódź, Poland) is a Polish ice dancer.

== Career ==
Early in his career, Bernadowski competed with Karolina Dobrodziej.

From 1997 to 2001, he competed with partner Aleksandra Kauc. They were two-time Polish bronze medalists and competed at the World Figure Skating Championships, the European Figure Skating Championships, and the World Junior Figure Skating Championships. Early in their partnership, they were coached by Bozena Bernadowska and later they worked with Maria Olszewska-Lelonkiewicz.

Following his retirement from competitive skating, Bernadowski began performing professionally. He has appeared on Poland's Dancing on Ice. In the first season, which took place in 2007, he partnered with Anna Popek and placed 4th. In the second season, which took place in March 2008, he partnered with Karolina Nowakowska and placed 6th. In the third season, he partnered with Katarzyna Zielińska.

== Personal life ==
His younger brother, Maciej Bernadowski, has also competed in skating. Their mother, Bozena Bernadowska, is a skating coach.

== Programs ==
(with Kauc)

Season	Original dance	Free dance
2000–2001	Bei mir bist du schön by James Hopiner; Jumpin' at the Woodside by Basie	Notre-Dame de Paris by Riccardo Cocciante: Les Temps des Cathedrales; La Cour Miracles; Danse mon Esmeralda

== Results ==
=== With Aleksandra Kauc ===
Results
International
Event	1997–98	1998–99	1999–00	2000–01
Worlds			17th	
Europeans				22nd
GP Skate Canada				8th
Karl Schäfer			2nd	
Nebelhorn			4th	
Skate Israel			6th	
Winter Universiade				11th
International: Junior
Junior Worlds	8th	8th		
JGP France	6th			
JGP Germany	6th	4th		
JGP Slovakia		6th		
Autumn Trophy		2nd J.		
National
Polish Champ.	1st J.	1st J.	3rd	3rd
GP = Grand Prix; JGP = Junior Grand Prix; J. = Junior level

=== With Karolina Dobrodziej ===
Results
International
Event	1996–1997
World Junior Championships	20th
Grand Prix International St. Gervais	11th
Autumn Trophy	15th J.
J. = Junior level
