= Ruben Reus =

Dutch figure skater

Personal information
- Born: 5 October 1984 (age 41)
- Height: 176 cm (5 ft 9 in)

Figure skating career
- Country: Netherlands
- Skating club: Alkmaarsche IJsclub

Ruben Reus (born 5 October 1984 in Alkmaar) is a Dutch figure skater. He is the 2005 Dutch national champion. He placed 25th at the 2004 World Junior Figure Skating Championships. He has since turned professional. In 2006, he participated in Dancing on Ice.

== Results ==
Event	2002–03	2003–04	2004–05
Junior World Championships		25th	
Dutch Championships	1st J.	1st J.	1st
Dragon Trophy		4th J.	
Coupe Internationale de Nice		12th	
Crystal Skate Romania		5th	
