= Ewa Sonnet =

Polish glamour model and pop singer

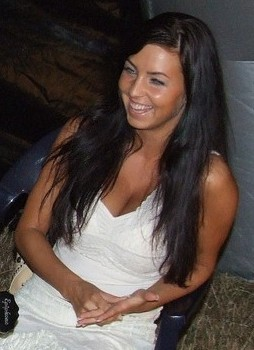
- Sonnet after a concert, Poland 8 July 2006
- Born: Beata Kornelia Dąbrowska; 8 March 1983 (age 43); Rybnik, Poland
- Occupations: Glamour model, Singer
- Years active: 2003–present
- Modeling information
- Height: 5 ft 4 in (1.63 m)
- Hair color: Dark Brown
- Eye color: Green

Ewa Sonnet ([ɛva ˈsɔnɛt], born Beata Kornelia Dąbrowska [bɛˈata kɔrˈnɛlja dɔmˈbrɔ(f)ska]) is a Polish glamour model and pop singer. Sonnet is the leading model of the Polish Busty models.

== Career in the entertainment industry ==
Ewa Sonnet was born in Rybnik, in southern Poland. After high school, Sonnet was discovered by a person working in the entertainment industry, and agreed to become a photo model. In late 2003, she began to model for the popular Polish web site Busty.pl. Sonnet posed topless for pictorials and videos for the site.

In November 2005, Sonnet posed topless for the Polish magazine CKM. It was her first magazine pictorial. In the interview with CKM, Sonnet said that her gorgeous breasts are all natural. She embarked on a music career, and on 11 December 2005, Sonnet made her first television appearance on The Kuba Wojewódzki Show on the Polsat channel in Poland to promote her new album Nielegalna ("Illegal").

In January 2006, Sonnet began performing concerts throughout Poland. Nielegalna was released in October 2006.

In September 2007, Sonnet took part in the Polish television show Gwiazdy Tańczą na Lodzie with skating partner Łukasz Jóźwiak. She posed again in the November 2006 and 2007 issues of CKM. She is the subject of numerous controversies involving unauthorized use of her image in pop culture.

== Discography ==
=== Albums ===
- 2006: "Nielegalna"
- 2007: "HypnotiQ"

=== Singles ===
- 2005: "...I R'n'B"
- 2006: "Nie zatrzymasz mnie"
- 2007: "Cry Cry"
- 2007: "Listen"
- 2009: "Close the Door"
