= Giulia Siegel =

German actress, singer, DJ, TV personality

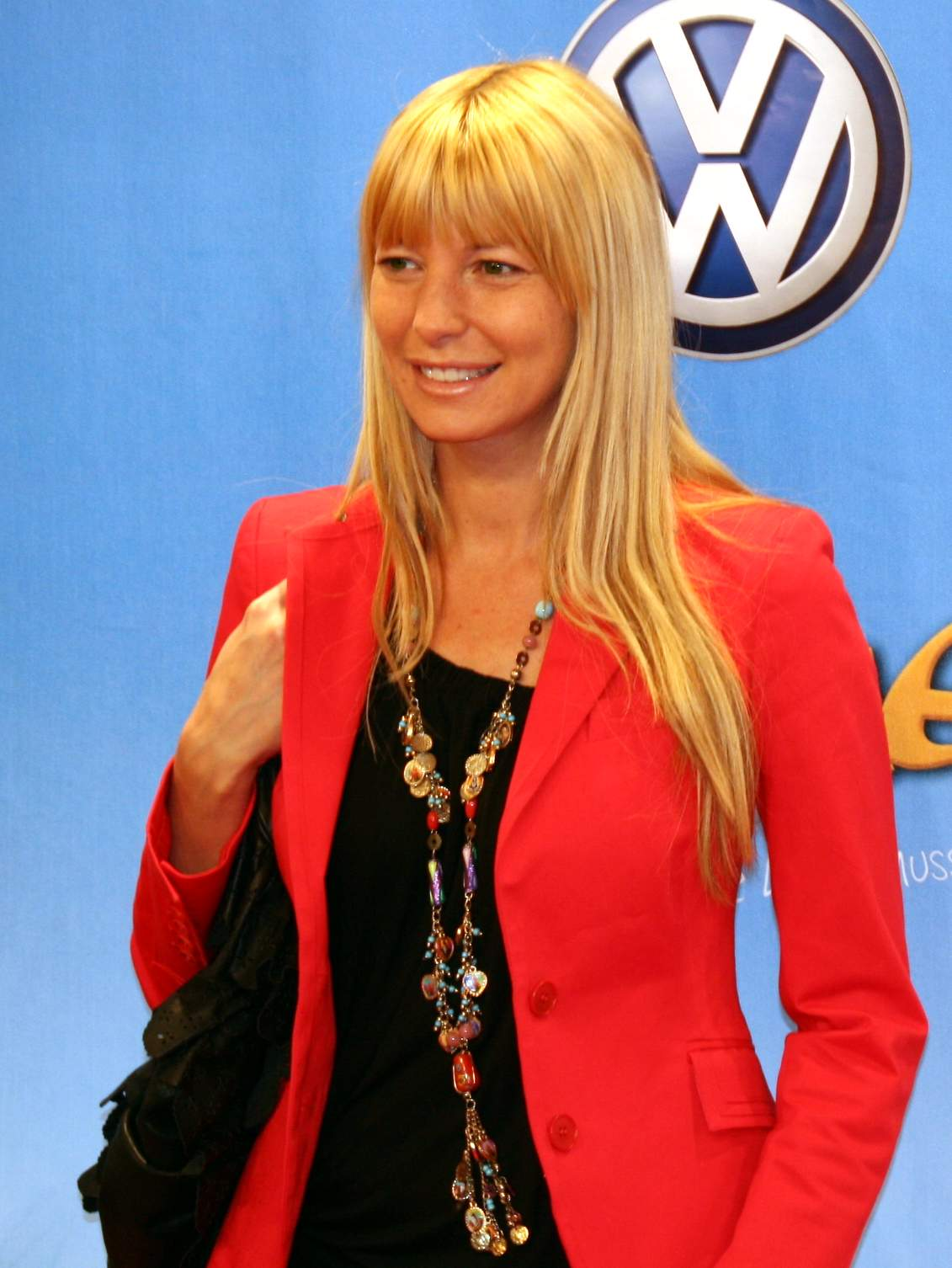
Siegel in 2008

Giulia Siegel (born Julia Anna Marina Siegel, 10 November 1974) is a German actress, presenter, DJ, model, and the daughter of composer and producer Ralph Siegel. Siegel started her career in 1991 as a model using the alias Giulia Legeis (Siegel spelled backwards). She switched to using her real name professionally in 1995.

== Career ==
Siegel was born Munich. She began her television career acting in commercials. In 1994, she expanded into German soap operas, landing a number of roles.

Starting in 1999, Siegel hosted various German television shows. In 2004, she accepted an offer to host the German McDonald's Chart Show. Beyond that she works as DJane.

In addition to her career as an actress and model, Siegel has been regularly performing as a DJ on weekends in various well-known Munich clubs. In 2007, she released "Dance!", both her first single and her first video.

== Personal life ==
Siegel is divorced from scientist and entrepreneur Hans Wehrmann. She has four children: Marlon, Mia, Nathan and Céline.
