= Joris Putman =

Dutch actor (born 1984)

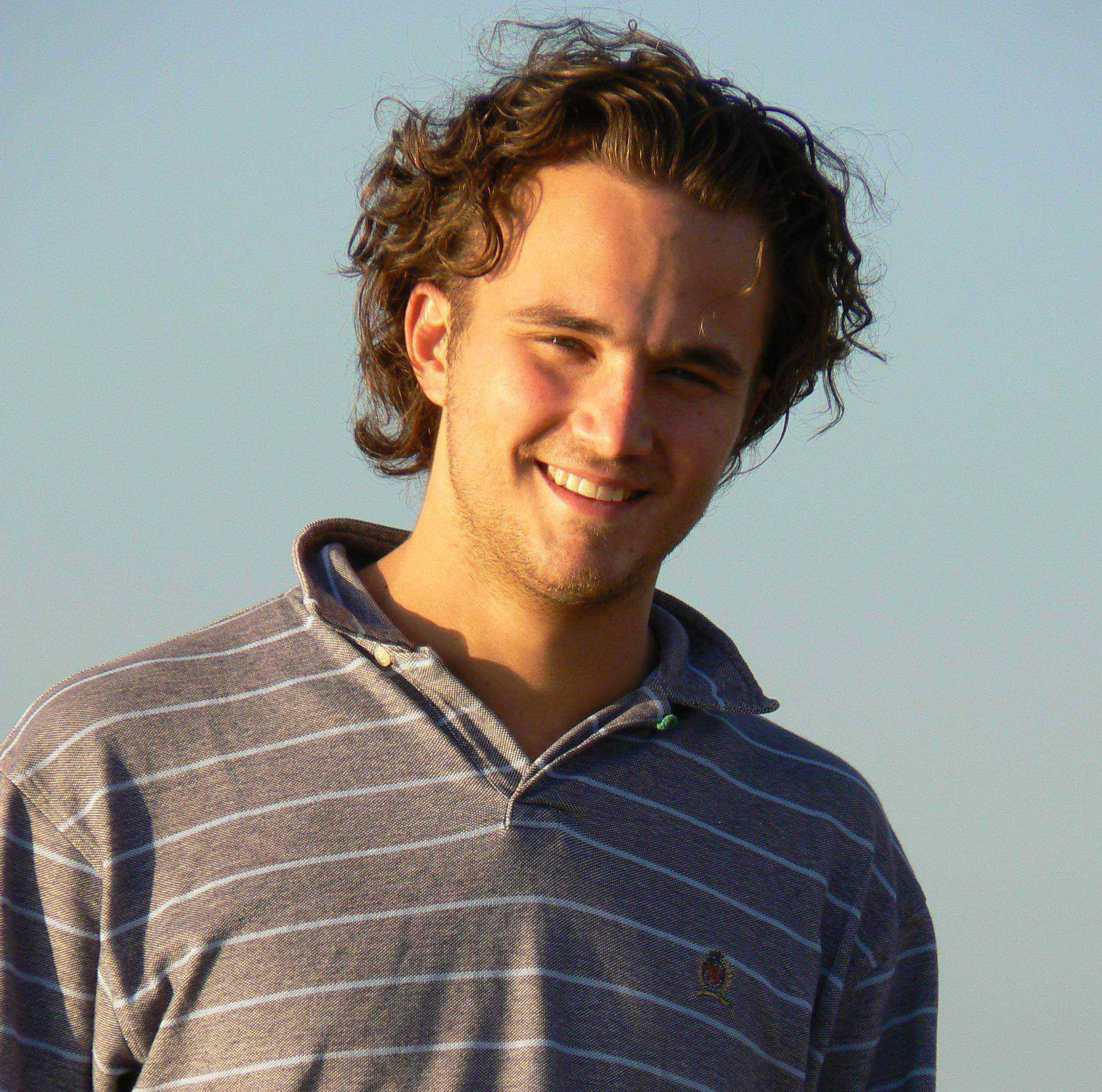
- Putman in 2006
- Born: 24 July 1984 (age 41); Netherlands, Noordwijk
- Occupation: Actor
- Years active: 1993 - present

Joris Jacques Kees Putman (born 24 July 1984 at Noordwijk in the Netherlands) is a Dutch actor.

== Career ==
Joris' mother is a non-western sociologist and his father is a documentary film-maker. From the age of three months until he was nine he and his parents lived out of Europe, firstly in Burkina Faso, West Africa, later in Bangkok, and from 1990 in Semarang in Indonesia, before returning to the Netherlands in 1993.

He first acted aged 7 in a Dutch film called "Oeroeg" ("Going Home") shot in Indonesia.

While at school in the Netherlands he acted in independent films and on TV. After finishing secondary school he moved to the UK to attend London Academy of Performing Arts (LAPA). After occasional film parts and, from 2000 onwards, some English language stage roles, he was given the part of Morris Fischer in the popular and long-running Dutch soap opera "Goede tijden, slechte tijden" ("Good Times, Bad Times"), which he played from 2004 until the end of 2006. March 2007 he became the winner of the Dutch "Dancing on Ice" TV contest. Currently he plays in two TV series: "The Sportlets" and "Puppy Patrol". He has developed his own programme for young people "Green Dream District" about new sustainable inventions which will show on "National Geographic" Youth from January 2009.

== Filmography ==
=== Television ===
- Goede tijden, slechte tijden (2004–2006): Morris Fischer

=== Film/Video ===
- Going Home (a.k.a. Oeroeg) (1993)
- Pest (1996)
- Emergency Exit (2001)
- Efteling Fairy Tales (2005)

=== As Himself ===
- Dancing on Ice (Dutch version) (2007)

== Sources ==
- Joris Putman at IMDb
- (in Dutch) Joris Putman official website
- (in Dutch) Dutch Dancing on Ice official website
- (in Dutch) 'Emergency Exit' short feature
