= Marcelo Polino =

Argentine journalist and television presenter

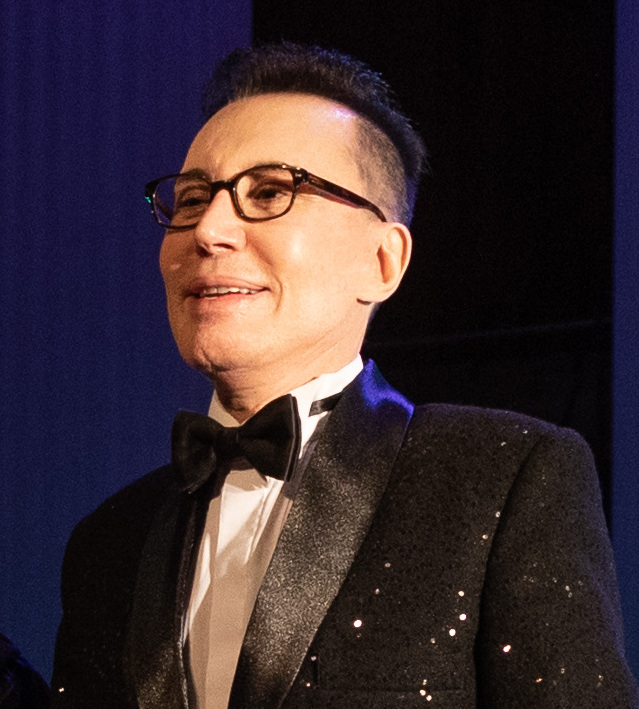
- Polino in 2024
- Born: January 30, 1964 (age 62); Tres Arroyos, Buenos Aires Province, Argentina
- Occupations: Journalist, television presenter, radio host
- Known for: Television judging and presenting work on Argentine entertainment programmes
- Parent(s): Juan Carlos Polino; Ethel Binetti

Marcelo Polino (born 30 January 1964) is an Argentine journalist, television presenter and radio host. He has hosted radio programmes such as ¿Quién es quién? and Polino auténtico, and he launched the underwear brand Marcelo Polino Underwear in 2010.

Polino is known for his prominent appearances on Argentine television, especially as a judge on Bailando por un Sueño, Cantando por un Sueño and Patinando por un sueño, as well as for programmes such as La Voz del embajador and Viviendo con las estrellas, among others.

== Recognition ==
In March 2018, he received the INADI Ambassador distinction for his commitment to combating discrimination. Polino was also among the entertainment figures recognized at Los Más Clickeados del Año in 2011, and was again part of the Bailando jury recognised at Los Más Clickeados 2018.
