= Łukasz Jóźwiak =

Polish ice dancer

Łukasz Jóźwiak (born 1985) is a Polish ice dancer. His former partner was Paulina Urban. They were coached by Maria Olszewska-Lelonkiewicz.

He will take part in the Polish television show Gwiazdy tańczą na lodzie with skating partner Ewa Sonnet.

== Competitive highlights ==
Event / Season	1999/2000	2000/2001
Junior Grand Prix, Skate Slovenia	14th	-
Junior Grand Prix, Gdańsk Cup	-	17th
