= Virginia Jetzt! =

German indie pop band

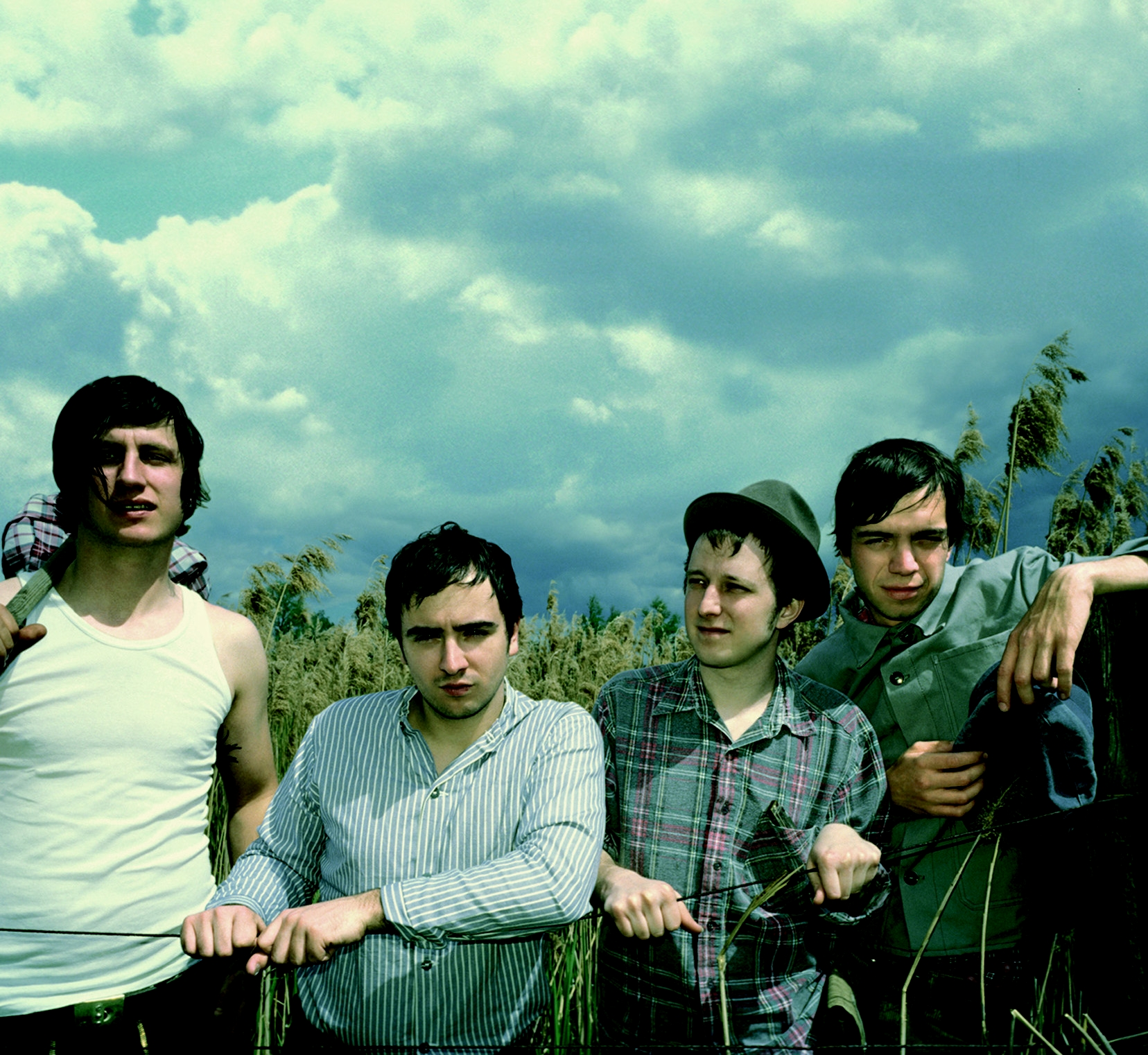

Background information
- Origin: Elsterwerda, Brandenburg; Germany
- Genres: Pop, Indie pop, Schlager
- Years active: 1999–2010
- Label: Universal Music
- Members: Nino Skrotzki; Thomas Dörschel; Mathias Hielscher; Angelo Gräbs
- Website: http://www.virginia-jetzt.de/

Virginia Jetzt! was a German indie pop band founded in the small town of Elsterwerda in Brandenburg in 1999; the quartet dissolved in October 2010.

The band has released four albums so far, their 2003 debut album Wer hat Angst vor Virginia Jetzt? — a reference to the Edward Albee play Who's Afraid of Virginia Woolf? — followed by Anfänger (English: Beginner) in 2004, Land Unter (English: Land Under) in 2007, and "Blühende Landschaften" (English: "Blooming Landscapes") in 2009.

Anfänger spawned three single releases; "Ein ganzer Sommer" (German Charts # 28, 2004), "Das ganz normale Leben" (# 72, 2004) and "Wahre Liebe" (# 49, 2005).

In 2005, the band represented Brandenburg in the Bundesvision Song Contest 2005, with the song "Wahre Liebe", placing 8th with 54 points.

January 2007 saw the band release their album Land Unter, containing the singles "Bitte bleib nicht, wenn du gehst"(German Charts # 54, 2006) (English: "Please don't stay, if you leave") and "Mehr als das" (# 75, 2007) (English: "More than that").

== Discography ==
- Virginia jetzt! (2000)
- Pophymnen (2001)
- Wer hat Angst vor Virginia Jetzt! (2003)
- Anfänger (2004)
- Anfänger Tour Edition (2005)
- Land Unter (2007)
- Blühende Landschaften (2009)
