= Lina Larissa Strahl =

German actress (born 1997)

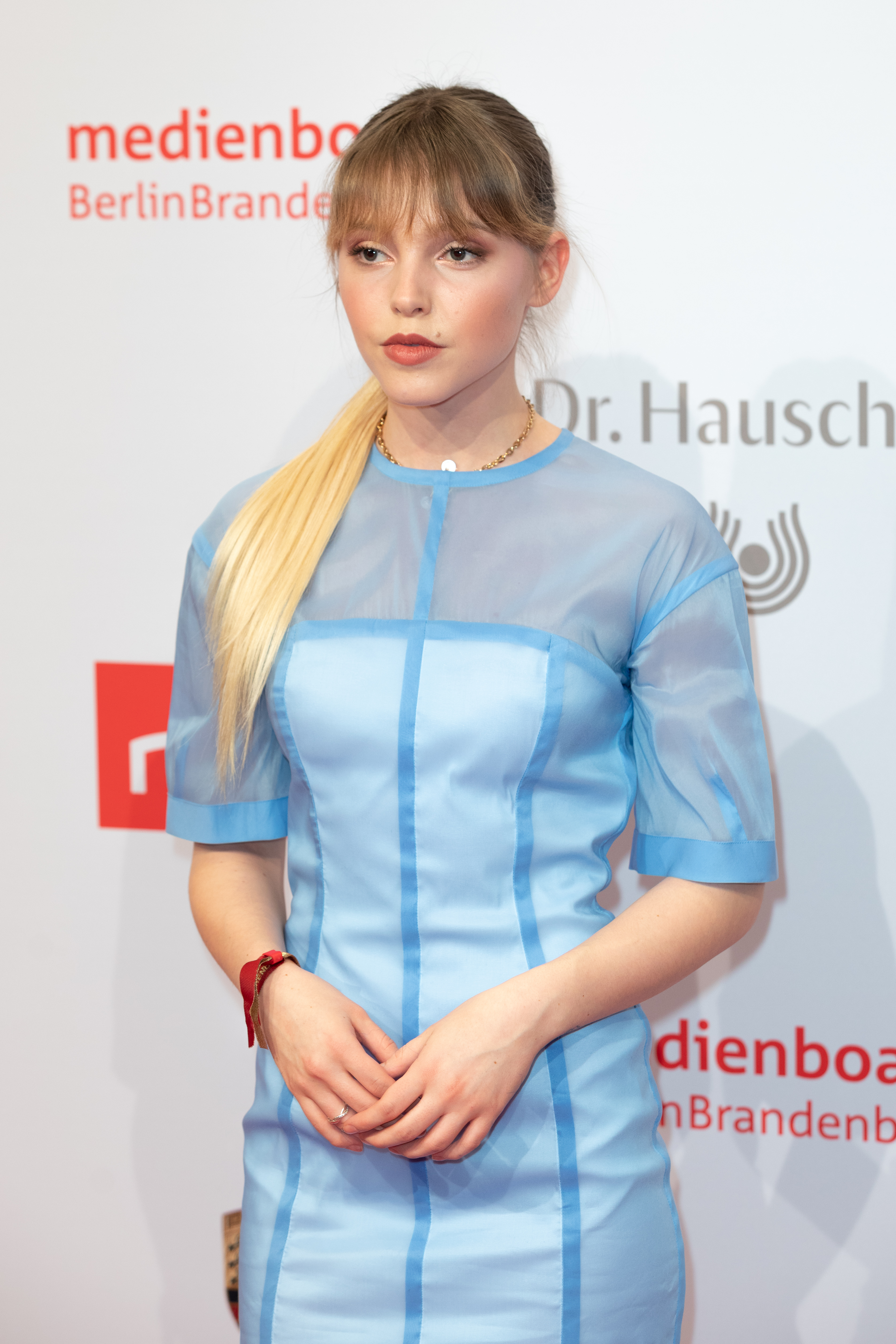
- Strahl in February 2019
- Born: 15 December 1997 (age 28); Seelze, Lower Saxony, Germany
- Occupations: Singer-songwriter; actress
- Years active: 2013-present
- Known for: The Lodge
- Partner: Tilman Pörzgen (2016-2023)

Lina Larissa Strahl (born 15 December 1997) is a German singer-songwriter and actress. She is known for her roles as Bibi Blocksberg in the Bibi & Tina film-series and Frankie in Disney Channel musical drama, The Lodge.

== Early life ==
Strahl was born in 1997. She was born and raised in Seelze, in the district of Hanover. She lives in Hamburg.

== Career ==
In 2013, Strahl won Dein Song (Your Song), a music competition on the children's channel KiKa, after performing Freakin’ out in the final, a song which was composed along with the group MIA. She released a single, Wie ich bin, in March 2016. Her first album, Official, was released later that year.

Strahl is also known for having played the role of Bibi Blocksberg in four Bibi & Tina films. In 2017, she appeared in The Lodge, playing a music student called Frankie. Later that year, Strahl released her second studio album, Ego. This became her first top 5 album in Germany. On 9 November 2018, Strahl released her third album, titled R3bellin. The album reached number 1 on the German charts.

After two years, her song Meins was released in 2020, followed by an EP of the same name in 2021. Later that year, she released another single called Wasser.

In 2022, she recorded the title song Look up to the sky for an adaptation of Little Peter’s Journey to the Moon. She also starred in the coming-of-age comedy Alle für Ella, which was later released on Netflix in 2025, landing on number 4 of the German movie charts.

Her fourth album, 24/1, was released in 2023. It reached number 9 on the German charts. In 2024, she took part in the German version of Let’s Dance. She came in 11th place. She once again provided the German voice for Moana in Moana 2. She also released a remake of the song Up, up, up (Nobody’s perfect), which was first released as part of the Bibi & Tina soundtrack, collaborating with Luca-Dante Spadafora, which reached number 87 on the German charts.

== Personal life ==
In 2016, she announced her relationship with German actor Tilman Pörzgen via Instagram. The couple met on the set of Bibi & Tina: Girls vs Boys. They split up in 2023.

== Filmography ==
Year	Title	Role	Notes
2014	Bibi & Tina	Bibi Blocksberg	
2014	Bibi & Tina: Bewildered and Bewitched	Bibi Blocksberg	
2016	Bibi & Tina: Girls vs. Boys	Bibi Blocksberg	
2016	Moana	Moana	German voice (only dialogue, not songs)
2017	Bibi & Tina: Perfect Pandemonium	Bibi Blocksberg	
2017	The Lodge	Frankie	8 episodes; recurring role
2018	Ralph Breaks the internet	Moana	German voice
2019	Booksmart	Triple A	German voice
2021	Rumble	Winnie Coyle	German voice
2022	Fireheart	Georgia Nolan	German voice
2022	Alle für Ella	Ella	
2023	Sweat	Lina	1 episode
2024	IF	Unicorn	German voice
2024	Moana 2	Moana	German voice
2025	A Mouse Hunt for Christmas	Lea	German voice

== Discography ==
=== Studio albums ===
Title	Album details	Peak chart positions		
Title	Album details	GER	AUT	SWI
Official	Released: 27 May 2016; Label: BMG Rights; Format: CD, digital download	12	55	—
Ego	Released: 3 November 2017; Label: BMG Rights; Format: CD, digital download	4	25	73
R3bellin	Released: 9 November 2018; Label: BMG Rights; Format: CD, digital download	2	10	25
24/1	Released: 3 March 2023; Label: BMG Rights; Format: CD, digital download	9	—	—
Melodrama	Released: 3 January 2026; Label: Hansa Local; Format: CD, digital download	12	---	--

=== Soundtracks ===
Title	Album details	Peak chart positions			Sales	Certifications
Title	Album details	GER	AUT	SWI	Sales	Certifications
Bibi und Tina	Released: 27 February 2014; Label: Kiddinx; Format: CD, digital download	12	24	78		
Bibi und Tina: Voll verhext!	Released: 19 December 2014; Label: Kiddinx; Format: CD, digital download	10	19	44	GER: 200,000	BVMI: Platinum
Bibi und Tina: Mädchen gegen Jungs	Released: 15 January 2016; Label: Kiddinx; Format: CD, digital download	1	2	14	GER: 400,000	BVMI: 2× Platinum
Bibi und Tina: Tohuwabohu total	Released: 15 January 2016; Label: Kiddinx; Format: CD, digital download	2	2	11	GER: 100,000	BVMI: Gold

=== Singles ===
List of singles, with selected chart positions
Title	Year	Peak chart positions	Album
Title	Year	GER	Album
"Freakin' Out" (featuring MIA.)	2013	63	Dein Song 2013
"Richtig gehört"	2013	—	—
"Dreams"	2014	—	—
"Wie ich bin"	2015	—	Official
"Ohne dieses Gefühl"	2016	—	Official
"Glitzer"	2017	—	Ego
"Leicht"	2017	—	Ego
"Unser Film"	2017	—	Ego
"Rebellen"	2018	—	R3bellin
"Meins"	2020	-	Meins
"Wasser"	2021	-	-
"Look up to the Sky"	2022	-	Peterchen’s Mondfahrt (Soundtrack)
"Meine Fehler"	2022	-	Alle für Ella (Soundtrack)
"Lonely Star"	2022	-	Alle für Ella (Soundtrack)
"Wenn ich die Augen schließe (Achtabahn Mix)"	2022	—	—
"Up, Up, Up (Nobody’s perfect)" (feat. Luca-Dante Spadafora)	2024	87	—
"Sie weiß (Betty Draper)"	2025	—	Melodrama
"Liebst mich"	2025	—	Melodrama
"24/7"	2025	—	Melodrama
"Für immer"	2025	—	Melodrama
"Vanille" (feat. Dominik Hartz)	2025	—	—
"—" denotes a recording that did not chart or was not released in that territory.

=== Other charted songs ===
Title	Year	Peak chart positions	Album
Title	Year	GER	Album
"Mädchen gegen Jungs" (with Lisa-Marie Koroll, Philipp Laude and Louis Held)	2016	97	Bibi und Tina: Mädchen gegen Jungs
"—" denotes a recording that did not chart or was not released in that territory.

== Awards and nominations ==
Award	Year	Category	Work	Result	Ref.
Dein Song	2013	Songwriter of the year	Freakin’ Out feat. MIA	Won	
New Faces Awards	2015	special prize	Bibi & Tina - Bewildered and Bewitched (with Lisa-Marie Koroll)	Won	
Echo Music Prize	2017	Pop national	Ego	Nominated	
Echo Music Prize	2018	Pop national	R3BELLIN	Nominated	
Audi Generation Awards	2018	media	Self	Won	
Young ICONs-Awards	2019	actor/actress	Self	Won	
