= Reinhard Ketterer =

German figure skater

Reinhard E. Ketterer
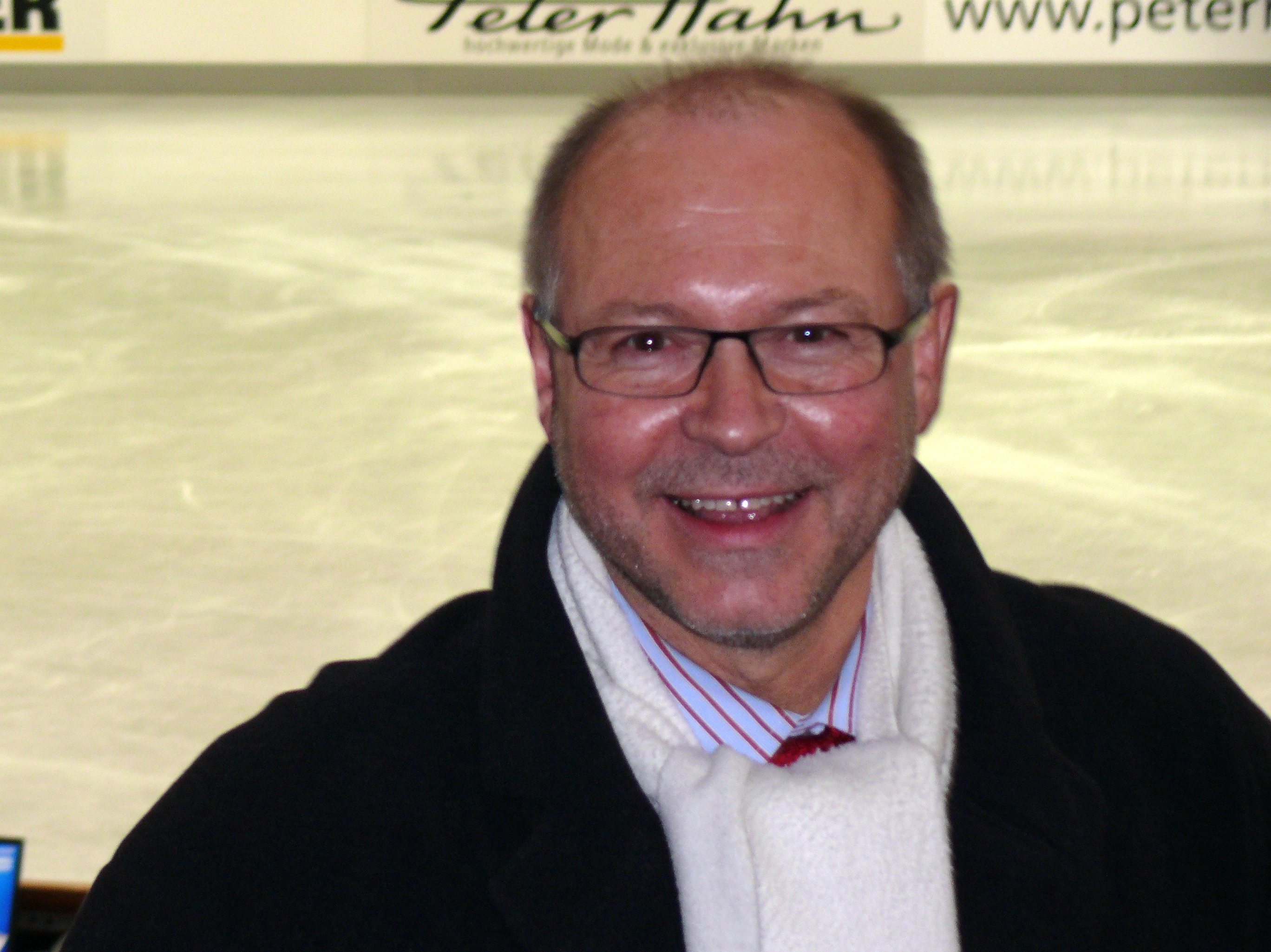
- Reinhard Ketterer at the 2009 German Championships

Personal information
- Full name: Reinhard E. Ketterer
- Born: 1948 (age 77–78) Garmisch-Partenkirchen

Figure skating career
- Country: West Germany

Reinhard E. Ketterer (born 1948 in Garmisch-Partenkirchen) is a German retired competitive figure skater who competed for West Germany as a single skater and pair skater. As a single skater, he is the 1969 German national champion, and as a pair skater, he is the 1972 German bronze medalist with partner Gabriele Cieplik. He is still a figure skating coach.

== Career ==
Reinhard E. Ketterer started figure skating at the club SC Riessersee in 1956 after the 1956 World Figure Skating Championships in Garmisch-Partenkirchen. His first coach was Sepp Schönmetzler Senior, the father of former German Champion Sepp Schönmetzler. Later Reinhard Ketterer was coached by Erich Zeller.

As a single skater, Ketterer won the 1969 German Figure Skating Championships. He switched to pair skating in 1968, inspired by Almut Lehmann. Lehmann & Ketterer won the novice bronze medal at the 1969 German Championships. In 1971 the pair Claudia Zander/Reinhard Ketterer won the junior gold medal at the German championships. Three years later, Ketterer won the bronze medal at the 1972 German Figure Skating Championships with partner Gabriele Cieplik.

He retired from competitive skating that year. He focused on his professional education and career. The following years he appeared in over 600 figure skating shows.

From 1972 to 1973, Ketterer studied at the German Sport University Cologne to become an independent teacher for sport. From 1974 to 1978, he passed the Abitur at the "Gymnasium and Kolleg Sankt Matthias" in Wolfratshausen. From 1979 to 1984, he studied teaching, specialising in sports and German language at LMU Munich. From 1985 to 1988, he studied remotely at the Coach Academy Cologne.

Beside his studies, Ketterer was leading coach at the SC Riessersee in Garmisch-Partenkirchen from 1978 to 1992 and is an honorary member of this club. From 1982 to 1991, he was also taught classes for the Norwegian National team and was a member of the teaching team for the Norwegian coach education.

Until he became a pensioner he was head of the Federal base camp in Berlin. He still is leading coach for educating coaches on C-level (German classification).

Since 1992, Ketterer is leading coach and chairman of the federal sport base figure skating Berlin. He also leads the coach education there. In 1994, he has become a member of the teaching team for coach education of the Deutsche Eislauf Union. He is also a coach of novice and junior skaters as well as the German national team. In 2010, he joined the teaching team of the Austrian coach education.

Since 2013, he is Vice chairman of the Berlin Ice sport federation (BERLINER EISSPORT-VERBANDES e.V.).

In 2006, he appeared as a jury member at the TV show Dancing on Ice on the German TV station RTL.

Ketterer lives with his longtime girlfriend in Lichterfelde-West in Berlin.

== Competitive highlights ==
=== Single skating ===
Event	1964–65	1965–66	1966–67	1967–68	1968–69	1969–70
World Championships				17th	16th	
European Championships		14th			12th	
German Championships	5th	3rd	4th		1st	2nd
Nebelhorn Trophy						2nd

=== Pair skating ===
Event	1970-1971	1971-1972
World Championships		13th
European Championships		13th
German Championships	1st J**	3rd***

* Novice with Almut Lehmann,  ** Junior with Claudia Zander,  *** with Gabriele Cieplik
