= Aleksandra Bechtel =

German television presenter

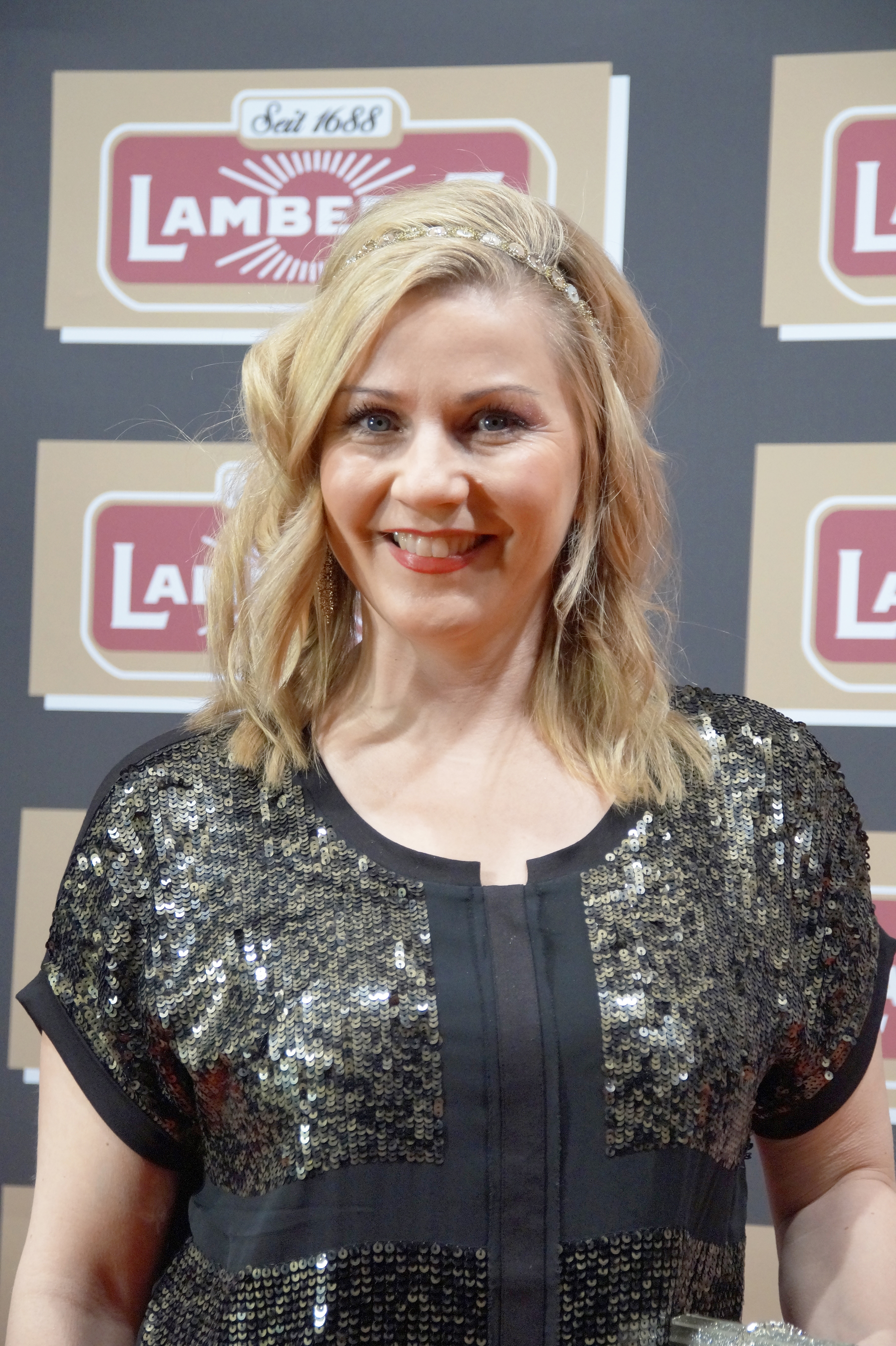
- Aleksandra Bechtel, 2016
- Born: October 1, 1972 (age 53); Cologne, Germany
- Status: Married
- Occupation: Journalist
- Years active: 1993–present
- Title: Correspondent/anchor
- Children: 2

Aleksandra Martha Justine Bechtel (born October 1, 1972) is a Finnish-German TV-presenter and personality. In 1993, she started working for the new TV channel VIVA Germany as a VJ. Bechtel, and from 1996, starred with Matthias Opdenhövel in the TV show Bitte lächeln on RTL II for two years.

She is married to Alexander Lassen. The couple has two sons.
