= Michał Milowicz =

Polish singer and actor (born 1970)

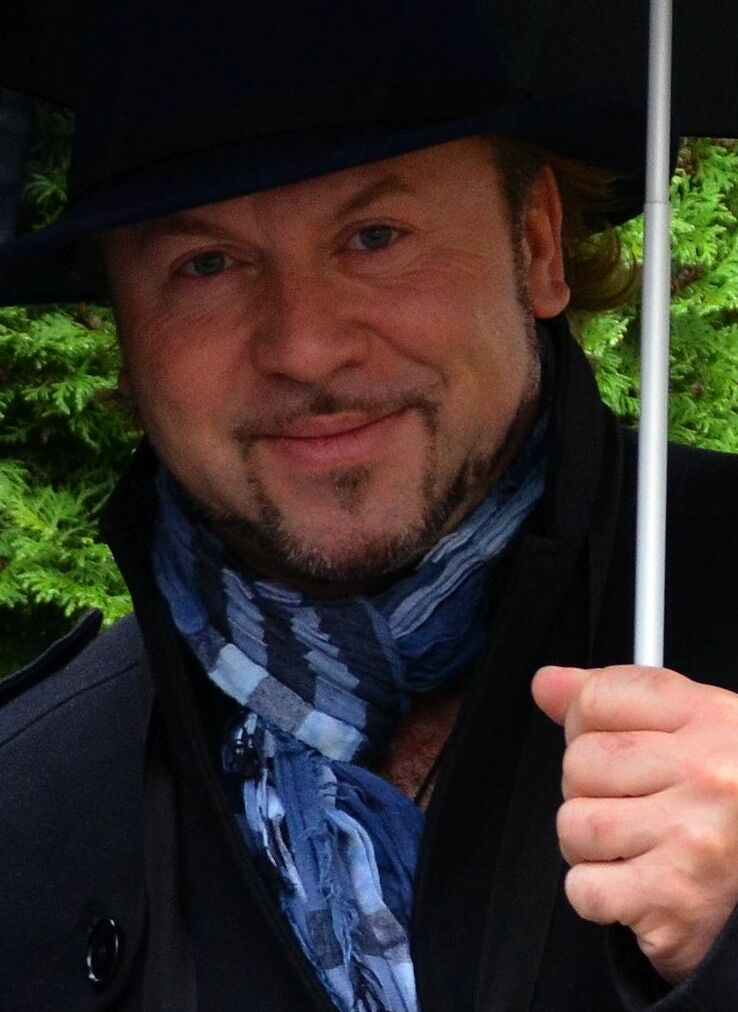
- Born: Michał Milowicz; 16 September 1970 (age 55); Warszawa, Poland
- Occupations: Actor, singer
- Years active: 1995–present
- Website: http://www.milowicz.pl/

Michał Jerzy Milowicz (born 16 September 1970) is a Polish singer and actor.

== Career ==
He worked in three theatres since beginning of his career: Studio Buffo (1995–2001), Teatr Muzyczny Roma (2001–2003) and Teatr Muzyczny im. Danuty Baduszkowej in Gdynia (2003). His debut music album called Teraz Wiersz was released in June 2003. He is the team captain in TV Puls music show Singa Dinga since 29 October 2007. In 2006 he participated in IV season of polish edition of Dancing with the Stars and III season of polish edition of Dancing on Ice

== Actor ==
- Młode wilki (1995) as policeman
- Klan (1997) as driver
- Sztos (1997) as student
- Ja, Malinowski (1999) as Dziad
- Kiler-ów 2-óch (1999) as Radek
- Lokatorzy (1999–2005) as Cezary Cwał-Wiśniewski
- Chłopaki nie płaczą (2000) as Bolec,
- Poranek kojota (2001) as Brylant
- Wiedźmin (2001) as Crach an Craite
- Zostać Miss (2001) as Zdzisław
- Segment '76 (2002)
- Rób swoje, ryzyko jest Twoje as Lutek Star
- Agentki (2008) as Paweł's boss
- Do wesela się zagoi (2009) as former fiance of customer (Elżbieta Romanowska).
- Chwila nieuwagi, czyli drugi sztos (2011)
- Barwy szczęścia (2012) as Czarek, physical education teacher and Blanka Filipska's schoolmate
- Kac Wawa as Bonawentura, army mate

== Dubbing ==
- 2011 Crysis 2 – commander C.E.L.L. Lockhard
- 2009: Arthur and the Revenge of Maltazard – Max
- 2006: Arthur and the Invisibles – Max
- 2005: Hoodwinked! – Japeth
- 2004: Home on the Range – Alameda Slim / Bracia Wacuś
- 1991: Rock-a-Doodle − Chanticleer
