= Daniel Weiss (figure skater) =

German figure skater

Personal information
- Born: 18 July 1968 (age 58) Ingolstadt, Bavaria, West Germany

Figure skating career
- Country: Germany
- Coach: Karel Fajfr
- Skating club: ERC Ingolstadt
- Retired: 1992

Daniel Weiss (born 18 July 1968) is a German former competitive figure skater who competed in men's singles. He is the 1989 Skate Canada International bronze medalist, the 1991 Nations Cup bronze medalist, and a two-time German national champion, winning the title in 1990 and 1991. He finished fifth at the 1989 European Championships and competed at three World Championships. After retiring from competition in 1992, Weiss skated professionally and works as a television commentator. He also organizes ice shows.

== Competitive highlights ==
International
Event	1982–83	1983–84	1984–85	1985–86	1986–87	1987–88	1988–89	1989–90	1990–91	1991–92
Worlds						19th	12th		18th	
Europeans							5th	7th	10th	
Nations Cup										3rd
Skate Canada								3rd		
Skate Electric									2nd	
International: Junior
Junior Worlds		11th	6th	5th						
National
German Champ.	11th	WD	5th	6th	4th	3rd	2nd	1st	1st	3rd
WD = Withdrew
