= Ich bin ein Star – Holt mich hier raus! season 14 =

Ich bin ein Star – Holt mich hier raus!
- Season 14
- Presented by: Sonja Zietlow; Daniel Hartwich
- No. of days: 16
- No. of contestants: 12
- Winner: Prince Damien Ritzinger
- Runner-up: Sven Ottke
- No. of episodes: 16

Release
- Original network: RTL
- Original release: 10 January – 25 January 2020

Season chronology
- ← Previous; Season 13

Ich bin ein Star – Holt mich hier raus! returned for its fourteenth series on 10 January 2020 on RTL. Sonja Zietlow and Daniel Hartwich returned for their fourteenth and eighth season as hosts, respectively. Also the paramedic Bob McCarron alias "Dr. Bob" was back.

On 26 January 2020, the season was won by Prince Damien Ritzinger, with Sven Ottke finishing as the runner-up.

== Celebrities ==
The celebrity cast line-up for the fourteenth series was confirmed on 31 December 2019.

Celebrity	Known for	Status
Prince Damien Ritzinger	singer (Deutschland sucht den Superstar season 13 winner)	Winner on 26 January 2020
Sven Ottke	professional boxer and world super middleweight champion	Runner-up on 26 January 2020
Danni Büchner	Reality TV performer (Goodbye Deutschland! Die Auswanderer)	Third place on 26 January 2020
Markus Reinecke	Antiques dealer (Die Superhändler – 4 Räume, 1 Deal)	Eliminated 8th on 25 January 2020
Raúl Richter	actor (Gute Zeiten, schlechte Zeiten)	Eliminated 7th on 25 January 2020
Elena Miras	Reality-Star (Love Island, Das Sommerhaus der Stars – Kampf der Promipaare)	Eliminated 6th on 24 January 2020
Claudia Norberg	Ex-wife of Michael Wendler	Eliminated 5th on 23 January 2020
Anastasiya Avilova	Reality TV performer (Temptation Island – Versuchung im Paradies)	Eliminated 4th on 22 January 2020
Sonja Kirchberger	Austrian actress	Eliminated 3rd on 21 January 2020
Toni Trips	singer (Deutschland sucht den Superstar season 16 contestant)	Eliminated 2nd on 19 January 2020
Marco Cerullo	Reality TV performer (Die Bachelorette, Bachelor in Paradise)	Eliminated 1st on 18 January 2020
Günther Krause	Politician	Withdrew on 11 January 2020

== Results and elimination ==
Indicates that the celebrity received the most votes from the public
Indicates that the celebrity received the fewest votes and was eliminated immediately (no bottom two)
Indicates that the celebrity was in the bottom two of the public vote

Daily results per celebrity
	Day 8	Day 9	Day 10	Day 11	Day 12	Day 13	Day 14	Day 15	Day 16 Final		Number of trials
	Day 8	Day 9	Day 10	Day 11	Day 12	Day 13	Day 14	Day 15	Round 1	Round 2	Number of trials
Prince Damien	6th 7.39%	4th 8.70%	—N/a	3rd 14.03%	1st 18.47%	2nd 18.35%	1st 28.28%	1st 34.26%	1st 71.47%	Winner; 80.62%	7
Sven	4th 9.23%	5th 8.00%	—N/a	5th 11.54%	5th 10.76%	1st 18.77%	2nd 16.59%	3rd 19.18%	2nd 16.76%	Runner-up; 19.38%	6
Danni	1st 21.67%	3rd 13.92%	—N/a	2nd 14.21%	3rd 16.07%	4th 13.21%	4th 14.80%	2nd 20.12%	3rd 11.77%	Eliminated (Day 16)	12
Markus	3rd 11.21%	1st 25.50%	—N/a	4th 13.56%	6th 10.66%	6th 11.25%	3rd 16.20%	4th 14.34%	Eliminated (Day 15)		6
Raul	9th 3.29%	9th 4.22%	—N/a	8th 7.55%	7th 10.64%	3rd 16.21%	5th 12.28%	5th 12.10%	Eliminated (Day 15)		5
Elena	2nd 21.36%	2nd 17.43%	—N/a	1st 14.96%	2nd 17.52%	5th 11.52%	6th 11.85%	Eliminated (Day 14)			7
Claudia	7th 7.18%	6th 7.43%	—N/a	6th 8.82%	4th 11.21%	7th 10.69%	Eliminated (Day 13)				3
Anastasiya	10th 3.26%	8th 4.31%	—N/a	7th 8.15%	8th 4.67%	Eliminated (Day 12)					3
Sonja	5th 7.96%	7th 6.53%	—N/a	9th 7.18%	Eliminated (Day 11)						3
Toni	8th 4.36%	10th 3.96%	Eliminated (Day 9)								2
Marco	11th 3.09%	Eliminated (Day 8)									2
Günther	Withdrew (Day 2)										0
Notes	None		1	None					2		
Bottom two	Marco; Anastasiya	Toni; Raul	Anastasiya; Raul	Sonja; Raul	Raul; Anastasiya	Markus; Claudia	None				
Eliminated	Marco; 3.09% to save	Toni; 3.96% to save	Eviction cancelled	Sonja; 7.18% to save	Anastasiya; 4.67% to save	Claudia; 10.69% to save	Elena; 11.85% to save	Raul; 12.10% to save	Danni; 11.77% to win	Sven; 19.38% to win	
Eliminated	Marco; 3.09% to save	Toni; 3.96% to save	Eviction cancelled	Sonja; 7.18% to save	Anastasiya; 4.67% to save	Claudia; 10.69% to save	Elena; 11.85% to save	Markus; 14.34% to save	Danni; 11.77% to win	Prince Damien; 80.62% to win	

=== Notes ===
- ^Note 1: On day 10, none of the celebrities were eliminated because on day 2, Günther withdrew.
- ^Note 2: The public voted for who they wanted to win, rather than save.

== Bushtucker trials ==
The contestants take part in daily trials to earn food. These trials aim to test both physical and mental abilities. The winner is usually determined by the number of stars collected during the trial, with each star representing a meal earned by the winning contestant for their camp mates.

The public voted for who they wanted to face the trial
The contestants decided who did which trial
The trial was compulsory and neither the public nor celebrities decided who took part

Trial number	Air date	Name of trial	Celebrity participation	Public %/ Contestants vote	Number of stars	Notes
1	10 January	"Wanne-Heikel"	Elena; Prince Damien; Danni; Toni; Raúl; Sonja	—N/a	1/6 stars	3
2	10 January	"Brücke" ("Bridge")	Marco; Sven; Anastasiya; Claudia; Markus	—N/a	3/5 stars	4
3	10 January	"Dinner for twelve - Die gleiche Kotzedur wie jedes Jahr" ("Dinner for Twelve - The same vomit-dure as every year")	All celebrities	—N/a	3/12 stars	5, 6
4	11 January	"Grauen Under" ("Terror Under")	Elena; Danni	40.67% 15.47%	0/11 stars	none
5	12 January	"Albtraumschiff" ("Nightmare Ship")	Danni	36.00%	4/11 stars	none
6	13 January	"Heißer Stuhl" ("Hot Seat")	Elena; Danni	36.37% 25.13%	5/11 stars	none
7	14 January	"Ge-Fahrstuhl" ("Dangerous elevator")	Danni	33.59%	0/11 stars	7
8	15 January	"Verlies Navidad" ("Dungeon Navidad")	Danni; Elena	43.34% 17.32%	2/11 stars	none
9	16 January	"Kaffee und Fluchen" ("Coffee and Swearing")	Danni; Elena	46.41% 12.08%	2/11 stars	none
10	17 January	"Das große GenÖLe" ("The big [oil-]grumble")	Danni; Elena	43.03% 14.80%	9/11 stars	none
11	18 January	"Ge-Fahrstuhl" ("Dangerous elevator")	Markus	10 of 10	8/10 stars	none
12	19 January	"Hör mal, wie behämmert" ("Listen, how hammered")	Prince Damien; Sonja	5 to 18; 5 to 18	1/9 stars	8
13	20 January	"Sternefabrik" ("Star Factory")	Sven; Raúl; Markus; Anastasiya	6 to 9; 2 to 9; 1 to 9; 0 to 9	2/9 stars	9
14	21 January	"Würg-Stoffcenter" ("Vomit Recycling Center")	Claudia; Prince Damien	5 to 8; 3 to 8	6/8 stars	10
15	22 January	"Höhenfluch" ("High Curse")	Markus; Raúl; Sven	3 to 7; 2 to 7; 1 to 7	6/7 stars	11
16	23 January	"Jungle Unchained"	Prince Damien; Danni	3 to 6; 2 to 6	0/6 stars	none
17	24 January	"Creek der Sterne" ("Creek of the stars")	Prince Damien; Danni; Raúl; Sven; Markus	—N/a	5/5 stars	none
18	25 January	Appetizer: "Alles kann, nichts muss" ("Everything is possible, nothing is necessary")	Danni	—N/a	1/5 stars	none
19	25 January	Main dish: "Ohne Fleiß kein Preis" ("No pain no gain")	Sven	—N/a	1/5 stars	none
20	25 January	Dessert: "Übung macht den Meister" ("Practice makes perfect")	Prince Damien	—N/a	4/5 stars	none

Notes

- ^3 Prince Damien won one Star.
- ^4 Marco, Anastasiya and Markus won by one Star.
- ^5 Günther was not able to participate, so Danni was allowed to do it for him.
- ^6 Markus, Sonja and Prince Damien won by one Star.
- ^7 Trial refused with the words Ich bin ein Star – Holt mich hier raus!.
- ^8 Each Contestant had 2 votes and they had to give 1 vote for one man and one for a woman.
- ^9 The 3 with the most votes had to go to the Bushtucker trial (Sven, Raul and Markus). Since Sven had the most votes, he had to choose a fourth player and he chose Anastasiya.
- ^10 Prince Damien and Claudia won 3 out of 4 stars each.
- ^11 Markus and Raúl had the most votes and had to go to Bushtucker trial. They had to choose a third celebrity between Danni and Sven, with the last going with them.

=== Result table: Who Should go to the Bushtucker Trials? ===
Celebrity	Day 1	Day 2	Day 3	Day 4	Day 5	Day 6	Day 7
Prince Damien	6.26%	7.24%	5.81%	6.64%	6.29%	5.14%	3.94%
Sven	2.02%	2.76%	3.32%	5.13%	4.67%	3.43%	3.50%
Danni	15.47%	36.00%	25.13%	33.59%	43.34%	46.41%	43.04%
Markus	5.98%	6.13%	6.72%	8.37%	6.72%	6.58%	5.61%
Raúl	3.32%	2.43%	2.78%	3.26%	3.68%	2.97%	2.55%
Elena	40.64%	25.41%	36.37%	20.53%	17.32%	12.08%	14.80%
Claudia	3.89%	3.24%	4.31%	4.27%	3.28%	2.77%	2.32%
Anastasiya	10.08%	7.05%	5.95%	5.21%	4.03%	3.61%	4.48%
Sonja	2.27%	2.19%	2.62%	2.89%	3.41%	10.28%	11.42%
Toni	7.30%	5.29%	4.08%	4.63%	3.66%	2.97%	5.34%
Marco	2.77%	2.26%	2.91%	5.48%	3.60%	3.76%	3.00%

== Star count ==
Celebrity	Trials	Awarded stars	Possible stars	Percentage	Stars
Prince Damien	7	10.5	16.5	63.63%	10.5/16.5 stars
Sven	6	5	13.25	37.73%	5/13.25 stars
Danni	12	15	55	27.27%	15/55 stars
Markus	6	14	20.25	69.13%	14/20.25 stars
Raul	5	2.5	6.25	40%	2.5/6.25 stars
Elena	7	8	29.5	27.11%	8/29.5 stars
Claudia	3	3	6	50%	3/6 stars
Anastasiya	3	1.5	4.25	35.29%	1.5/4.25 stars
Sonja	3	1.5	6.5	23.07%	1.5/6.5 stars
Toni	2	0	2	0%	0/2 stars
Marco	2	1	2	50%	1/2 stars
Günther	0	0	0	0%	

== Treasure Hunt ==
The candidates go on a treasure hunt in pairs and solve a task. If successful, they usually bring a treasure chest to the camp. There the chest is opened, in which there is a quiz question with two possible answers. If the candidates answer the task correctly, there is a profit such as sweets or spices; if they answer incorrectly, there is a useless consolation prize such as a garden gnome. Less often there is an instant win after completing the task.

The celebrities got the question correct
The celebrities got the question wrong

Episode	Air date	Celebrities	Task	Questions and answers	Prize won	Notes
4	13 January	Claudia; Marco	"Vier Fäuste" ("Four Fists")	What is the number one reason for separation in Germany according to a study for men? A: Too rarely sex B: The feeling of not being loved enough	Peppermint Tea	none
5	14 January	Anastasiya; Raul	"Rundum Fragen" ("Questions All Around")	Who has got more Followers on Instagram? A: Donald Trump; B: Toni Kroos	Lemon	none
11/12	20–21 January	Danni; ~~Sonja~~; Markus; Elena	"Affenstark" ("Monkey-strong")	Where are you flying from Frankfurt am Main longer? A: Munich; B: Melbourne	Ovomaltine Crunchy Cream	12

Notes

- ^12 Shortly after arriving at the scene on 20 January, the treasure hunt was cancelled due to a thunderstorm. It was repeated the next day, yet since Sonja had left the camp in the meantime she was replaced by Elena.

== Ratings ==
Ratings of season 14
Episode		Duration (without advertising)	Date	Viewers		Share		Source
Episode		Duration (without advertising)	Date	Total	14-49 years	Total	14-49 years	Source
1	"Who should go to the Bushtucker Trials?"	158 Min.	10 January 2020	6.01 Mio.	3.12 Mio.	24.3%	40.3%	
2	"Who should go to the Bushtucker Trials?"	86 Min.	11 January 2020	5.34 Mio.	2.85 Mio.	22.2%	36.3%	
3	"Who should go to the Bushtucker Trials?"	67 Min.	12 January 2020	4.54 Mio.	2.23 Mio.	20.1%	30.7%	
4	"Who should go to the Bushtucker Trials?"	90 Min.	13 January 2020	4.43 Mio.	2.07 Mio.	24.7%	38.2%	
5	"Who should go to the Bushtucker Trials?"	88 Min.	14 January 2020	4.55 Mio.	2.17 Mio.	24.5%	37.9%	
6	"Who should go to the Bushtucker Trials?"	53 Min.	15 January 2020	5.05 Mio.	2.53 Mio.	24.0%	39.8%	
7	"Who should go to the Bushtucker Trials?"	81 Min.	16 January 2020	4.60 Mio.	2.26 Mio.	23.8%	38.9%	
8	"Who should stay in the Camp?"	87 Min.	17 January 2020	5.45 Mio.	2.59 Mio.	25.1%	37.4%	
9	"Who should stay in the Camp?"	75 Min.	18 January 2020	5.96 Mio.	2.76 Mio.	24.4%	35.8%	
10	"Who should stay in the Camp?"	71 Min.	19 January 2020	5.02 Mio.	2.37 Mio.	23.6%	34.3%	
11	"Who should stay in the Camp?"	87 Min.	20 January 2020	4.58 Mio.	2.00 Mio.	24.7%	36.0%	
12	"Who should stay in the Camp?"	87 Min.	21 January 2020	4.84 Mio.	2.22 Mio.	26.4%	39.5%	
13	"Who should stay in the Camp?"	53 Min.	22 January 2020	4.72 Mio.	2.17 Mio.	22.6%	34.4%	
14	"Who should stay in the Camp?"	75 Min.	23 January 2020	4.79 Mio.	2.16 Mio.	24.8%	38.0%	
15	"Who should stay in the Camp?"	61 Min.	24 January 2020	5.69 Mio.	2.69 Mio.	23.8%	36.8%	
16	"Final"	124 Min.	25 January 2020	6.22 Mio.	3.04 Mio.	30.0%	44.0%	
17	"The Big Reunion"	111 Min.	26 January 2020	3.82 Mio.	1.89 Mio.	11.7%	18.7%	
