= The One (Aneta Sablik album) =

Studio album by Aneta Sablik
- Released: 23 May 2014
- Length: 41:11
- Label: Polydor; Island

The One is the debut album by Polish singer Aneta Sablik. It was released by Polydor Island on23 May 2014 in German-speaking Europe, following her victory in the eleventh season of Deutschland sucht den Superstar, the German version of Idol franchise.

== Promotion ==
"The One" was released as the album's lead single in 2014 following Sablik's victory on Deutschland sucht den Superstar. The song achieved commercial success across several European territories, reaching number one in Germany, Austria, Switzerland, and Luxembourg, while also peaking at number 12 in Iceland. In Germany, the single was certified gold by the Bundesverband Musikindustrie (BVMI) for selling over 150,000 copies. A second and final single, "We Could Be Lions," was also released from the album, though it failed to chart.

== Critical reception ==
Professional ratings
Review scores
Source	Rating
laut.de	2/5 stars

Danni Fromm from laut.de rated the album harshly, criticizing The One as a rushed, formulaic DSDS product that wastes Aneta Sablik’s considerable vocal talent on soulless, interchangeable dance-pop productions. She argued that despite Sablik being one of the few deserving winners with genuine singing ability, the album buries her voice beneath plastic beats, clichéd choruses, and uninspired songwriting created solely for quick commercial exploitation. Fromm concluded that Sablik's potential "to be lions" was squandered on music that ultimately feels "completely irrelevant."

== Chart performance ==
The One achieved moderate commercial success in German-speaking Europe following Sablik's victory on Deutschland sucht den Superstar. The album peaked at number 11 on the German Albums Chart, while also reaching number 14 in Austria and number 25 in Switzerland, becoming the first album by a DSDS winner since second-season winner Elli Erl's 2004 album Shout It Out not to reach a top ten position in any country.

== Track listing ==
The One track listing
No.	Title	Writer(s)	Producer(s)	Length
1.	"The One"	Konstantin "Djorkaeff" Scherer; Matthias "B-Case" Zürkler; Oliver Pum; Sylvia Gordon; Vincent "Beatzarre" Stein	B-Case; Beatzarre; Djorkaeff	3:37
2.	"You Make Me Whole"	Ben Kohn; Ina Wroldsen; James Reynolds; Peter Kelleher; Tom Barnes; Wayne Hector	B2X; Johannes Schmalenbach; Mathias Ramson	3:27
3.	"Begin Again"	Curtis Richa; Hiten Bharadia; Raphaella Mazaheri-Asadi; Sigurdur Kristinn Sigtryggsson	B2X; Schmalenbach; Ramson	3:45
4.	"Bad Things"	Clarence Hutchinson; Scherer; Michelle Bell; Saabira Chandler; Stein	Brix; B2X; Ramson	3:05
5.	"You Pull Me to Pieces"	Coyle Girelli; Peter-John Vettese	Brix; B2X; Ramson	3:25
6.	"We Could Be Lions"	Dee Adam; Simon Leigh Hulbert	B2X; Schmalenbach; Ramson	3:42
7.	"That Man Is Mine"	Scherer; Sylvia Gordon; Stein	Beatzarre; Scherer	3:02
8.	"Tell a Story"	Andreas Moe; Randi Soyland; Sebastian Thott	B2X; Schmalenbach; Ramson	3:16
9.	"Secret in the Sky"	Alex James; Alexx Mack; Harry Sommerdahl; Whitney Phillips	B2X; Schmalenbach; Ramson	3:18
10.	"Paper Planes and Runaway Trains"	James; Sommerdahl; Taylor Parks; Phillips	B2X; Schmalenbach; Ramson	3:33
11.	"Just Not Into You"	Scherer; Gordon; Stein	Beatzarre; Scherer	3:30
12.	"The World Is in Love"	Angelika Vee; Ivo Moring; Kevin Zuber; Mariana Wagner	B2X; Schmalenbach; Ramson	3:40
Total length:				41:11

== Charts ==
Weekly chart performance for The One
Chart (2014)	Peak position
Austrian Albums (Ö3 Austria)	14
German Albums (Offizielle Top 100)	11
Swiss Albums (Schweizer Hitparade)	25
