= Günther Krause =

German engineer, academic, politician and businessman (born 1953)

Günther Krause Bundesminister a. D.
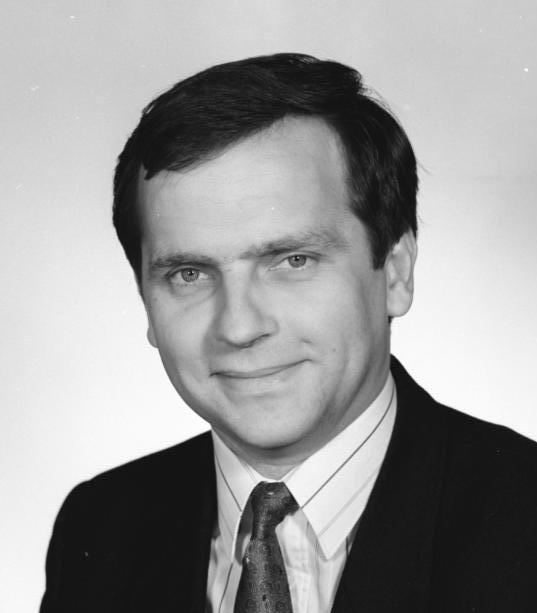
- Krause in 1990

Minister of Transport
- In office 18 January 1991 – 6 May 1993
- Chancellor: Helmut Kohl
- Preceded by: Friedrich Zimmermann
- Succeeded by: Matthias Wissmann

Minister of Post and Telecommunications
- Interim; 17 December 1992 – 22 January 1993
- Chancellor: Helmut Kohl
- Preceded by: Christian Schwarz-Schilling
- Succeeded by: Wolfgang Bötsch

Minister for Special Affairs
- In office 3 October 1990 – 17 January 1991 Serving with Hans Klein, Lothar de Maizière, Sabine Bergmann-Pohl, Rainer Ortleb, Hansjoachim Walther
- Chancellor: Helmut Kohl
- Preceded by: Office established
- Succeeded by: Office abolished

Leader of the Christian Democratic Union in Mecklenburg-Vorpommern
- In office 3 March 1990 – May 1993
- General Secretary: Berndt Seite; Günter Reitz
- Preceded by: Office established
- Succeeded by: Angela Merkel
Wende political career (1990)
State Secretary in the Minister-President's Office
In office 12 April 1990 – 3 October 1990
Minister-President	Lothar de Maizière
Preceded by	Office established
Succeeded by	Office abolished
Leader of the CDU/DA group in the Volkskammer
In office 10 April 1990 – 2 October 1990
Preceded by	Lothar de Maizière
Succeeded by	Alfred Dregger (as Leader of the CDU/CSU/DSU group in the Bundestag)
Member of the Volkskammer; for Rostock
In office 5 April 1990 – 2 October 1990
Preceded by	Constituency established
Succeeded by	Constituency abolished

Member of the Bundestag
- In office 3 October 1990 – 10 November 1994
- Preceded by: Constituency established
- Succeeded by: Hans-Otto Schmiedeberg
- Constituency: Volkskammer (1990); Wismar – Gadebusch – Grevesmühlen – Doberan – Bützow (1990–1994)

Personal details
- Born: 3 September 1953 (age 73) Halle (Saale), East Germany
- Party: Christian Democratic Union
- Other political affiliations: East CDU (1975–1990)
- Spouse: Heike Krause-Augustin (m. 2004)
- Children: 3
- Education: Wismar University of Technology, Business and Design
- Occupation: Politician; Engineer; Academic; Businessman

Military service
- Allegiance: East Germany
- Branch/service: National People's Army
- Years of service: 1972–1974

Günther Krause (born 3 September 1953) is a German engineer, academic, politician and businessman.

He was born and raised in East Germany. After the Peaceful Revolution, he entered politics, serving in the East German Volkskammer and as a senior adviser to Minister-President Lothar de Maizière. In that role, he was a co-signatory to the Unification Treaty.

After German reunification, he was elected to the Bundestag and served in various roles in the Helmut Kohl government. He served as Minister for Special Affairs from 1990 to 1991 and then as Minister of Transport from 1991 to 1993. He resigned from the office due to numerous scandals. Legal problems and scandals followed after his career in politics, earning him the nickname Sause-Krause.

Former Chancellor of Germany Angela Merkel was his protégée. As leader of the Christian Democratic Union (CDU) in Mecklenburg-Vorpommern, he helped her garner the nomination in her constituency. Merkel succeeded him as leader after he resigned.

== Early life and education ==
Krause is a native of Güstrow near Mecklenburg, East Germany. He was born on 3 September 1953 in Halle. He received a PhD in engineering from Wismar University of Technology, Business and Design in 1987.

== Career and activities ==
Krause joined the Christian Democratic Union of East Germany in 1975. He worked as an engineer on computerized planning in housing in Rostock. In 1982, he began to work at his alma mater, Wismar Technology University, and was promoted to a professorship in computer science. Then he became the CDU state chairman from Mecklenburg-Western Pomerania. He served as state secretary and the chief reunification negotiator for East Germany's only freely elected government headed by Lothar de Maizière. Krause was also his senior advisor. The Unification Treaty was signed by West German Interior Minister Wolfgang Schauble and Krause on 31 August 1990.

Following the reunification of West and East Germany, Krause served at the Bundestag and in its committee on research and technology. He was appointed as minister of transport on 18 January 1991 in the fourth Kohl cabinet. He was the most prominent eastern German politician in the government and one of the three ministers from East Germany in addition to Angela Merkel (CDU; Minister for Women and Youth) and Rainer Ortleb (FDP; Minister of Education). Krause resigned from the office on 6 May 1993 after his alleged involvement in scandals, and was replaced by Matthias Wissmann, another CDU member, in the post. Krause was the eighth minister to quit the Kohl cabinet in the past 13 months.

In 1993, Krause resigned from politics and public office and began to deal with business. As of 2010, he headed a company on information, advice and project development based in Kirchmöser, a district of Brandenburg. Later, Krause was targeted by the judiciary due to his company's insolvency and was sentenced to imprisonment and suspended sentences. He also lived in a luxury mansion without pay for over a year and was involved in other cheating scandals, such as an unreturned kitchen purchase.

In 2020, he entered the 14th season of the TV reality show, Ich bin ein Star – Holt mich hier raus!, the German version of I'm a Celebrity...Get Me Out of Here!, filmed in Australia, but had to withdraw for medical reasons after one day.

== Personal life ==
Krause married twice and has six children, three from his previous marriage. He lives in Admannshagen in Mecklenburg-Vorpommern with his second wife.
