= The One (Aneta Sablik song) =

Single by Aneta Sablik

from the album The One
- Released: 3 May 2014
- Recorded: 2014
- Genre: Dance-pop, Eurodance
- Length: 3:35
- Label: Polydor
- Songwriters: Sylvia Gordon, Matthias Zürkler, Konstantin "Djorkaeff" Scherer, Vincent "Beatzarre" Stein, Oliver Pum
- Producer: Vincent "Beatzarre" Stein

Aneta Sablik singles chronology
"The One" (2014)	"We Could Be Lions" (2014)

"The One" is the debut single by Polish pop singer Aneta Sablik. She premiered the single at the final of the 11th season of German casting show Deutschland sucht den Superstar. Sablik was announced as the show's winner in the night of 3 May 2015, making Meltem Ackigöz the runner-up. The song was released on 3 May 2014 to digital outlets from Oceania and Europe, debuting at number one on the iTunes download charts of all German-speaking countries. It later debuted on the first position in the official charts of Germany, Austria, Switzerland and Luxembourg.

== Critical reception ==
OK! found the song "very catchy" and "ideally suited for the mainstream."

== Chart performance ==
Chart (2014)	Peak position
Austria (Ö3 Austria Top 40)	1
Europe (Euro Digital Songs)	10
Germany (GfK)	1
Iceland (Heimlistinn)	12
Luxembourg (Billboard)	1
Switzerland (Schweizer Hitparade)	1

== Certifications ==
Region	Certification	Certified units/sales
Germany (BVMI)	Gold	200,000^{‡}
^{‡} Sales+streaming figures based on certification alone.
