= Aneta Sablik =

Polish singer (born 1989)

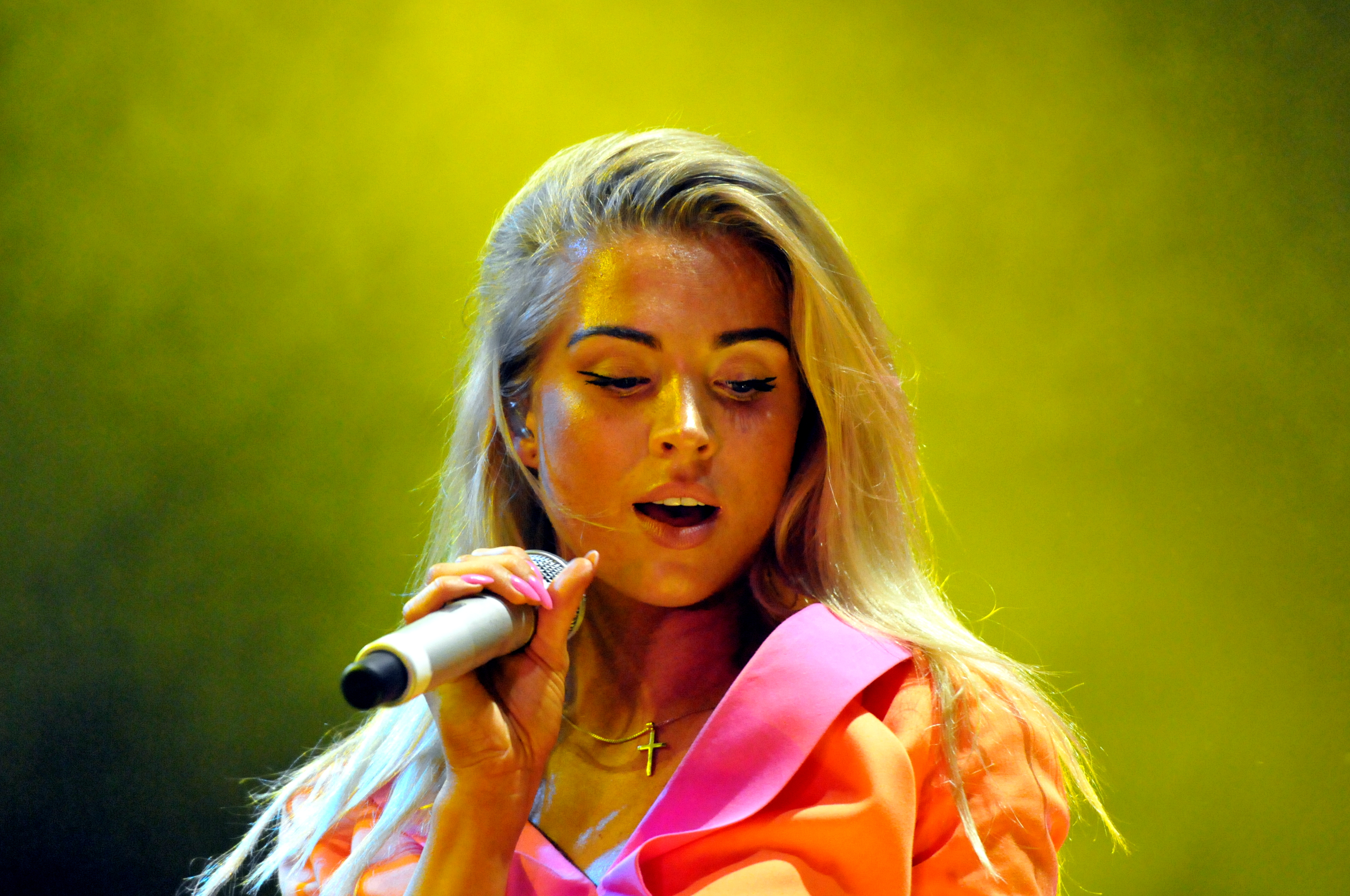
- Sablik performing in 2014

Background information
- Born: 12 January 1989 (age 37); Bielsko-Biała, Poland
- Genres: Dance-pop, pop, pop-rock
- Occupation: Singer
- Years active: 2014–present
- Labels: Polydor, Universal
- Website: aneta-sablik.eu

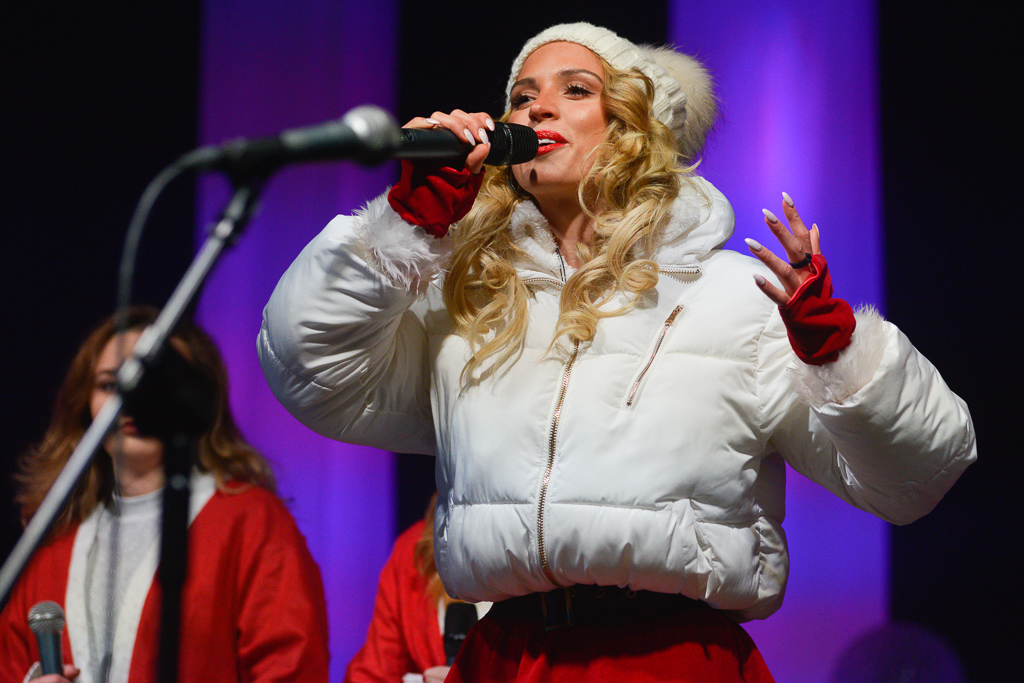
Sablik during Christmas concert, Poland, 2016

Aneta Sablik (born 12 January 1989) is a Polish pop singer. She gained popularity after winning the eleventh season of Deutschland sucht den Superstar (DSDS; "Germany Seeks the Superstar"), broadcast on RTL. Sablik was the first competitor to receive the highest number of points at every live show.

She was announced the winner of season 11 on 3 May 2014, winning €500,000, a car, and a record label contract. She digitally launched her debut single "The One" on the same day of winning season 11, which topped music charts in Germany, Austria, Switzerland, and Luxembourg.

Sablik signed a contract with Polydor Records (owned by Universal Music Group) to release her debut album, titled The One in late 2014. In February 2017, she placed ninth in the 2017 edition of Krajowe Eliminacje with the song "Ulalala".

== Discography ==
=== Albums ===
Title	Album details	Peak chart positions		
Title	Album details	AUT	GER	SWI
The One	Released: 23 May 2014; Label: Universal Music; Formats: CD, digital download	14	11	25

=== Singles ===
==== As lead artist ====
Song	Year	Peak chart positions					Certifications	Album
Song	Year	AUT	GER	ICE	LUX	SWI	Certifications	Album
"The One"	2014	1	1	12	1	1	BVMI: Gold	The One
"We Could Be Lions"	2014	—	—	—	—	—		The One
"Popcorn Party" (featuring MC Popcorn)	2015	—	—	—	—	—		Non-album singles
"Ulalala"	2017	—	—	—	—	—		Non-album singles
"Christmas Fever" (with Carmen Geiss featuring Bars & Melody and Jimmy Orlando)	2017	—	—	—	—	—		Non-album singles
"Er gehört uns beiden nicht mehr" (with Carmen Geiss)	2018	—	—	—	—	—		Non-album singles
"Glück"	2018	—	—	—	—	—		Non-album singles
"Ja to Ja (So wie ich bin)"	2018	—	—	—	—	—		Non-album singles
"—" denotes a recording that did not chart or was not released in that territory.

==== As featured artist ====
- 2016 – "Perfect Love" (Kevin David featuring Aneta Sablik)

== Performances at DSDS season 11 ==
Sablik was the first competitor to receive the highest number of points at every Live Show.

Live-Challenge-Show (Date)	Song	Original vocalist	Place
Club Night (29 March 2014)	I Want You Back	The Jackson Five	24.2% (1./6)
Band Night (5 April 2014)	Ain't No Other Man	Christina Aguilera	14.9% (1./10)
Duett Night (12 April 2014)	California King Bed	Rihanna	17.2% (1./8)
Duett Night (12 April 2014)	Dirty Diana	Michael Jackson	17.2% (1./8)
Do your own thing! (19 April 2014)	I'm Outta Love	Anastacia	21.7% (1./6)
Do your own thing! (19 April 2014)	I Need Your Love	Calvin Harris feat. Ellie Goulding	21.7% (1./6)
Interpret your song (26 April 2014)	Wake Me Up	Avicii feat. Aloe Blacc	30.8% (1./4)
Interpret your song (26 April 2014)	Survivor	Destiny's Child	30.8% (1./4)
Final (3 May 2014)	If I Were a Boy	Beyoncé	43.6% (1./3)
Final (3 May 2014)	Dirty Diana	Michael Jackson	57.9% (1./2)
Final (3 May 2014)	The One	Aneta Sablik	57.9% (1./2)
