= Deutschland sucht den Superstar season 12 =

Deutschland sucht den Superstar
- Season 12
- Hosted by: Oliver Geissen (Event shows only)
- Judges: Dieter Bohlen; Heino; Mandy Capristo; DJ Antoine
- Winner: Severino Seeger
- Runner-up: Viviana Grisafi

Release
- Original network: RTL
- Original release: 17 January – 16 May 2015

Season chronology
- ← Previous; Season 11 Next → Season 13

The twelfth season of Deutschland sucht den Superstar was broadcast on German channel RTL from 17 January to 16 May 2015. It was won by Severino Seeger.

== History ==
During the live shows of the previous season, it was announced that the castings for season 12 would start in August 2014. RTL's Head of Program Frank Hoffmann stated that he wants to keep the series for the years the come, although the ratings continued to fall, especially in the live shows. He further explained that the live shows would be cut to an "absolute minimum". In late 2014, RTL gave closer details to the changes of season 12. The live shows are replaced with pre-recorded concerts in clubs in Germany, Austria, and Switzerland. Only the announcement of the results will be broadcast live. In contrary to the seasons before, the final will not take place in a TV studio in Cologne, but in the ÖVB Arena in Bremen.

For the first time, auditions will be held in the Czech Republic, Poland, the Netherlands, Luxembourg, and Belgium. Candidates had to be between 16 and 40 years old. In October 2014, RTL announced that Marianne Rosenberg, Mietze Katz, and Kay One wouldn't return for the twelfth season. The new jury consists of Dieter Bohlen, Swiss disc jockey DJ Antoine, Schlager singer Heino and singer Mandy Capristo.

The winner of the Deutschland sucht den Superstar 2015 was announced as Severino Seeger, with Viviana Grisafi finishing as the runner-up. The winner song, "Hero of My Heart", was produced and written by juror Dieter Bohlen.

=== Auditions and "Recall" ===
the start of the season was on Wednesday, 7 January 2015. In addition to longtime juror Dieter Bohlen, Popstars winner Mandy Capristo, DJ Antoine, and pop singer Heino were part of the jury. In the casting rounds, each candidate selected before the show from a Golden CD with the name of the juror, whose voice should be the deciding factor for advancement or leaving a draw jury voting. Menderes reached the fourth time the "Recall". There is a "Quick Pick" was held where each candidate had to sing again. RTL did not broadcast this Germany-Recall. Instead, only a short scene was shown in which piles announced that the 34 pre-worn Recall of the 110 candidates in Thailand recall were.

=== "Re-recall" ===
The Recall in Thailand was reached by 16 women and 18 men. The contestants were separated into three to four groups by each gender for the first four performances. The theme for the first performances on the highest building in Bangkok was Black and White. After that performance, the judges sent four contestants home. For the next challenge, which should be with a spectacular intro in the middle of a street in front of local inhabitants, they sang again in groups, with three of them leaving the competition after it. The third appearance in a historic temple district on the outskirts of Bangkok acknowledged the jury with seven return tickets and the advancement of 19 candidates. They had to go for the obligatory beach appearance on the island of Ko Hong Ko Hong archipelago in the south of the country. The location near Phuket, belonging to a national park island, formed a picturesque backdrop for the resignation of five other superstar aspirants. The remaining 14 candidates sang seven same-sex or mixed-duets on a covered swimming pool with Plexiglas.

The eliminated acts of the Re-recall were:

Place	Contestant	Age	Occupation	Origin
11 (eliminated in Thailand, Six Senses Resort)	Juna Manaj	23	Apprentice	Albania
11 (eliminated in Thailand, Six Senses Resort)	Kevin Spatt	24	Commercial clerk	Austria
11 (eliminated in Thailand, Six Senses Resort)	Melissa Nock	19	Student	Germany
11 (eliminated in Thailand, Six Senses Resort)	Susanne "Chica Susi Unique" Spahiu	21	Apprentice	Germany
15 (eliminated in Thailand, Andaman Sea)	Anna Carina Alpert	22	Businesswoman	Germany
15 (eliminated in Thailand, Andaman Sea)	Fitzroy Maxwell	41	Gardener	Jamaica
15 (eliminated in Thailand, Andaman Sea)	Katarina Durdevic	19	Apprentice	Germany
15 (eliminated in Thailand, Andaman Sea)	Noel Terhorst	20	Student	Germany
15 (eliminated in Thailand, Andaman Sea)	Sascha Grabowski	33	Soldier	Germany
20 (eliminated in Thailand, Mueang Boran)	Christoph Cronauer	19	Student	Germany
20 (eliminated in Thailand, Mueang Boran)	Daniela Da Silva Esteves	22	Agency worker	Portugal
20 (eliminated in Thailand, Mueang Boran)	Rebecca Schelhorn	19	Student and singer	Germany
20 (eliminated in Thailand, Mueang Boran)	Tina Umbricht	16	Student	Switzerland
24 (eliminated in Thailand, Mueang Boran)	Mustafa Papeoglou	23	Vendor	Greece; Turkey
24 (eliminated in Thailand, Mueang Boran)	Patrick Stiebe	22	Student	Germany
24 (eliminated in Thailand, Mueang Boran)	Randy Baker	22	Model	England
27 (eliminated in Thailand, Old town of Bangkok)	Amina Karoui	18	Apprentice	Austria
27 (eliminated in Thailand, Old town of Bangkok)	Christian Tesch	17	Model	Germany
27 (eliminated in Thailand, Old town of Bangkok)	Sandra Kraft	25	Mother	Germany
30 (eliminated in Thailand, Banyan Tree Bangkok)	Germaine Nassal	25	Photographer	France
30 (eliminated in Thailand, Banyan Tree Bangkok)	Kerim Yilmaz	22	Taxi driver	Turkey
30 (eliminated in Thailand, Banyan Tree Bangkok)	Patrick Nowak	24	Student	Germany
30 (eliminated in Thailand, Banyan Tree Bangkok)	Gianfranco Savoia	18	Apprentice	Italy
34 (eliminated voluntarily in Thailand, Banyan Tree Bangkok)	René Krebs	24	Car seller	Germany

== Finalists ==
Place	Contestant	Age	Occupation	Origin
Winner (won at Bremen, ÖVB Arena)	Severino Seeger	28	Account manager	Germany
2 (eliminated at Bremen, ÖVB Arena)	Viviana Grisafi	17	Student	Germany
3 (eliminated at Bremen, ÖVB Arena)	Antonio Gerardi	30	Florist	Italy
4 (eliminated in Leipzig, Leipziger Glashalle)	Erica Greenfield	35	Singer	Netherlands
4 (eliminated in Leipzig, Leipziger Glashalle)	Jeannine Rossi	26	Singer	Austria
4 (eliminated in Leipzig, Leipziger Glashalle)	Seraphina Ueberholz	20	Apprentice	Germany
7 (eliminated in Balve, Balver Höhle)	Laura Herrmann Lopez	23	Restaurant specialist	Guadeloupe
7 (eliminated in Balve, Balver Höhle)	Robin Eichinger	22	Student	Bangladesh
9 (eliminated in Ischgl, Event stage)	Leon Heidrich	21	Apprentice and model	Germany
9 (eliminated in Ischgl, Event stage)	Marcel Kärcher	32	Student	Germany

== Event-Shows ==
The Event shows are held from 25 April to 16 May 2015 with three pre-recorded shows and a live final. The voting results were published right after the final.

Color key

Contestant received the fewest votes and was eliminated
Contestant was in the bottom two, three or four
Contestant received the most votes from the public
Contestant was announced as the season's winner

=== Top 10 - Ischgl - "Top of the Mountain" ===
The first event show was held in Ischgl and was pre-recorded on 11 April 2015. The live result show in Cologne was aired directly after the event show. The two contestants with the fewest votes were eliminated.

Original airdate: 25 April 2015

Order	Contestant	Song	Result	Voting result
1	Severino Seeger	"Uptown Funk"	Safe	16.48% (3/10)
2	Viviana Grisafi	"Love Me Like You Do"	Safe	18.36% (2/10)
3	Leon Heidrich	"Einmal um die Welt"	Eliminated	3.13% (10/10)
4	Erica Greenfield	"Single Ladies (Put a Ring on It)"	Safe	4.67% (7/10)
5	Marcel Kärcher	"Au Revoir"	Eliminated	3.29% (9/10)
6	Jeannine Rossi	"Atemlos durch die Nacht"	Safe	7.55% (4/10)
7	Robin Eichinger	"When the Beat Drops Out"	Bottom three	4.19% (8/10)
8	Laura Lopez	"Bang Bang"	Safe	5.30% (5/10)
9	Seraphina Ueberholz	"Ich bin Ich"	Safe	4.86% (6/10)
10	Antonio Gerardi	"You Are So Beautiful"	Safe	32.17% (1/10)

- Group performance: "Auf uns" - Andreas Bourani
- Guest performance: Andreas Gabalier

=== Top 8 - Balver Höhle – "The Dome Of Stone" ===
The first event show will be held in the Balver Höhle and will be pre-recorded on 29 April 2015. The live result show in Cologne was aired directly after the event show. The two contestants with the fewest votes were eliminated.

Original airdate: 2 May 2015

Order	Contestant	Song	Result	Voting result
1	Laura Lopez	"Changing"	Eliminated	4.65% (7/8)
2	Viviana Grisafi	"Stay with Me"	Safe	17.03% (2/8)
4	Erica Greenfield	"Chandelier"	Safe	8.32% (4/8)
3	Robin Eichinger	"Firestone"	Eliminated	4.33% (8/8)
5	Jeannine Rossi	"Du hast mich tausendmal belogen"	Safe	6.56% (5/8)
6	Antonio Gerardi	"It's My Life"	Safe	13.91% (3/8)
7	Seraphina Ueberholz	"Ich Lebe"	Bottom three	6.24% (6/8)
8	Severino Seeger	"Unchained Melody"	Safe	38.96% (1/8)

- Group performance: "Love Runs Out"

=== Top 6 - Leipzig - "Semi-final" ===
The semi-final will be held in Leipzig at the Leipzig Trade Fair glass hall and was pre-recorded on 5 May 2015. The live result show in Cologne was aired directly after the event show. Only the three contestants with the most votes advanced to the final, and the other three were eliminated.

Original airdate: 9 May 2015

Order	Contestant	Song	Result	Voting result
1	Antonio Gerardi	"Impossible"	Bottom four	16.39% (3/6)
2	Erica Greenfield	"Lips Are Movin"	Eliminated	8.76% (5/6)
3	Jeannine Rossi	"Ich liebe das Leben"	Eliminated	9.01% (4/6)
4	Seraphina Ueberholz	"Applaus, Applaus"	Eliminated	5.21% (6/6)
5	Severino Seeger	"Breathe Easy"	Safe	35.56% (1/6)
6	Viviana Grisafi	"Masterpiece"	Safe	25.07% (2/6)
7	Erica Greenfield & Antonio Gerardi	"Up Where We Belong"	—N/a	—N/a
8	Jeannine Rossi & Seraphina Ueberholz	"Das Beste"	—N/a	—N/a
9	Viviana Grisafi & Severino Seeger	"Endless Love"	—N/a	—N/a

- Group performance: "Blame"

=== Top 3 - Bremen – "The Final" ===
Original airdate: 16 May 2015

The Final was held in Bremen at the ÖVB Arena in front of 11,000 people. One Contestant was eliminated after the first performance. The other two performed their favorite performance and the winner's single.

- Group performances: "Auf uns" - Andreas Bourani (by the eliminated contestants of the Top 10), "Don't Worry" (by the Top 3)
- Guest performer: Söhne Mannheims - "Geh davon aus"

Round 1

Order	Contestant	Song	Result	Voting result
1	Antonio Gerardi	"You Give Me Something"	Eliminated	21.64% (3/3)
2	Viviana Grisafi	"What I Did for Love"	Bottom two	38.19% (2/6)
3	Severino Seeger	"When I Was Your Man"	Safe	40.17% (1/3)

Round 2

Order	Contestant	Song^1	Order	Song^1	Result	Voting result
1	Viviana Grisafi	"Wrecking Ball"	3	"Hero of My Heart"	Runner-Up	41.43% (2/2)
2	Severino Seeger	"Unchained Melody"	4	"Hero of My Heart"	Winner	58.57% (1/2)

^1 Antonio Gerardi would have performed "Caruso" and "Hero of My Heart".

== Elimination chart ==
Females	Males	Top 10	Winner

Safe	Most votes	Safe Last	Eliminated

Stage:		Finals				
Week:		4/25	5/2	5/9	5/16	
Week:		4/25	5/2	5/9	Round 1	Round 2
Place	Contestant	Result				
1	Severino Seeger	3rd 16.48%	1st 38.96%	1st 35.56%	1st 40.17%	Winner; 58.57%
2	Viviana Grisafi	2nd 18.36%	2nd 17.03%	2nd 25.07%	2nd 38.19%	Runner-Up; 41.43%
3	Antonio Gerardi	1st 32.17%	3rd 13.91%	3rd 16.39%	3rd 21.64%	
4	Jeannine Rossi	4th 7.55%	5th 6.56%	4th 9.01%		
5	Erica Greenfield	7th 4.67%	4th 8.32%	5th 8.76%		
6	Seraphina Ueberholz	6th 4.86%	6th 6.24%	6th 5.21%		
7	Laura Lopez	5th 5.30%	7th 4.65%			
8	Robin Eichinger	8th 4.19%	8th 4.33%			
9	Marcel Kärcher	9th 3.29%				
10	Leon Heidrich	10th 3.13%				
