= Deutschland sucht den Superstar season 11 =

Deutschland sucht den Superstar
- Season 11
- Judges: Dieter Bohlen; Kenneth "Kay One" Glöckler; Mieze Katz; Marianne Rosenberg
- Winner: Aneta Sablik
- Runner-up: Meltem Acikgöz

Release
- Original network: RTL
- Original release: 8 January – 3 May 2014

Season chronology
- ← Previous; Season 10 Next → Season 12

The eleventh season of Deutschland sucht den Superstar was broadcast on German channel RTL from 8 January to 3 May 2014. The winner received a recording contract with Universal Music Group and €500,000. Participants had to be between 16 and 30 years old and could audition in 30 cities in Germany, Austria and Switzerland. Kenneth "Kay One" Glöckler, Mieze Katz and Marianne Rosenberg served as the judges.

For the second year in a row, the season featured a female final top two and produced a female "superstar" for the third time in the show's history. Aneta Sablik was announced as the winner on 3 May 2014.

== History ==
On 13 March 2013, RTL announced that there will be an eleventh season. The judges from the previous season, with the exception of Dieter Bohlen, were replaced by rapper Kay One, singer Mieze Katz of the band MIA., and Schlager singer Marianne Rosenberg. Nazan Eckes returned as the host of the eleventh season, however, without Raúl Richter. Bill and Tom Kaulitz from Tokio Hotel and Mateo from Culcha Candela left after the completion of season 10. The season started on Wednesday, 8 January 2014, on RTL.

The season's headline was "Kandidaten an die Macht!" ("Candidates, take over!"). Therefore, it was the first season that the contestants were completely in charge of their song choice and their stage performance. This also enabled them to choose an original song.

The season premiere attracted 2.70 million viewers, which makes it the least-watched season premiere in the history of Deutschland sucht den Superstar. However, ratings improved up to 3.33 million viewers by episode three, which made it the most-watched episode of the season within the demographics between ages 14–49.

== "Re-Recall" ==
The top 30, which consisted of 15 female and 15 male contestants, were brought to Cuba for the further competition. In the top 20 round, the judges chose the top 10 to compete in the live shows. Five of the ten eliminated contestants were given a wild card by the judges and made available for public voting. The two with the highest votes by the viewers will be joining the top 10.

== Top 15 ==
Females:

- Aneta Sablik, 23
- Anita Latifi, 18
- Elif Batman, 18
- Maxi Perez-Bursian, 20
- Meltem Acikgöz, 24
- Melody Haase, 20
- Sophia Akkara, 20
- Vanessa Valeria Rojas, 23
- Yasemin Kocak, 21

Males:

- Allesandro Di Lella, 21
- Angelo Bugday, 22
- Christopher Schnell, 25
- Daniel Ceylan, 28
- Enrico von Krawczynski, 19
- Richard Schlögl, 25

== "Live-Challenge-Shows" ==
The Mottoshows (theme shows) of the previous seasons were replaced by six Live-Challenge-Shows. In each show, two acts get eliminated. After the final, RTL revealed the voting results for each show.

Color key

Contestant received the fewest votes and was eliminated
Contestant was in the bottom two or three
Contestant received the most votes from the public
Contestant was announced as the season's winner

=== Top 12 - "Live-Challenge-Show: Dance" ===
Original airdate: 29 March 2014

In the first live show, the top 12 was split into two groups of six. In each group, one act had to leave the show. The challenge of the first live-challenge show required the contestant to include a dance routine into their performance.

Order	Contestant	Song	Result	Voting results
1	Alessandro Di Lella	"Impossible"	Bottom 2	8.8% (5/6)
2	Vanessa Valera-Rojas	"Next to Me"	Safe	19.2% (2/6)
3	Daniel Ceylan	"All Night Long (All Night)"	Safe	15.8% (4/6)
4	Sophia Akkara	"Jai Ho! (You Are My Destiny)"	Eliminated	8.3% (6/6)
5	Enrico von Krawczynski	"Beauty and the Beat"	Safe	16.9% (3/6)
6	Elif Batman	"Happy"	Safe	31.1% (1/6)
7	Aneta Sablik	"I Want You Back"	Safe	24.2% (1/6)
8	Richard Schlögl	"Ich lass für dich das Licht an"	Bottom 2	12.3% (5/6)
9	Meltem Acikgöz	"Skyscraper"	Safe	16.7% (4/6)
10	Christopher Schnell	"Dear Darlin'"	Safe	19.6% (2/6)
11	Larissa Melody Haase	"Addicted to You"	Eliminated	10.4% (6/6)
12	Yasemin Kocak	"Rather Be"	Safe	16.8% (3/6)

- Group performance: "Timber"

=== Top 10 - "Live-Challenge-Show: Band Night" ===
Original airdate: 5 April 2014

The challenge of the second live-challenge show was the emphasis on the vocals, meaning each performance featured a break to put focus on the contestants' vocal performance.

Order	Contestant	Song	Result	Voting results
1	Aneta Sablik	"Ain't No Other Man"	Safe	14.9% (1/10)
2	Daniel Ceylan	"End of the Road"	Bottom 4	8.2% (7/10)
3	Yasemin Kocak	"Free"	Bottom 3	8.2% (8/10)
4	Enrico von Krawczynski	"Story of My Life"	Safe	8.4% (6/10)
5	Meltem Acikgöz	"Your Song"	Safe	10.6% (4/10)
6	Alessandro Di Lella	"If I Could Turn Back the Hands of Time"	Eliminated	6.9% (10/10)
7	Vanessa Valera Rojas	"There You'll Be"	Eliminated	7.1% (9/10)
8	Richard Schlögl	"Demons"	Safe	9.2% (5/10)
9	Elif Batman	"Şımarık"	Safe	12.1% (3/10)
10	Christopher Schnell	"Right Here Waiting"	Safe	14.4% (2/10)

=== Top 8 - "Live-Challenge-Show: Duets" ===
Original airdate: 12 April 2014

The challenge of the third live-challenge show required the contestants to pick one of their competitors for a duet. Only one person of the winning duet-team was able to win the live challenge price.

Order	Contestant	Song	Result	Voting results
1	Meltem Acikgöz & Enrico von Krawczynski	"Higher"	—	—
2	Elif Batman & Christopher Schnell	"Say Something"	—	—
3	Yasemin Kocak & Daniel Ceylan	"I'm Your Angel"	—	—
4	Aneta Sablik & Richard Schlögl	"California King Bed"	—	—
5	Enrico von Krawczynski	"Boyfriend"	Eliminated	8.2% (8/8)
6	Meltem Acikgöz	"Footprints in the Sand"	Safe	13.8% (3/8)
7	Christoper Schnell	"Hero"	Safe	14.5% (2/8)
8	Elif Batman	"Son of a Preacher Man"	Eliminated	10.4% (7/8)
9	Daniel Ceylan	"Be Alright"	Bottom 3	11.1% (6/8)
10	Yasemin Kocak	"When Love Takes Over"	Bottom 4	11.3% (5/8)
11	Richard Schlögl	"Eisberg"	Safe	13.4% (4/8)
12	Aneta Sablik	"Dirty Diana"	Safe	17.2% (1/8)

=== Top 6 - "Live-Challenge-Show: Do Your Own Thing!" ===
Original airdate: 19 April 2014

The challenge of the fourth live-challenge show was to pick a song and make it their own.

Order	Contestant	First Song	Order	New version song	Result	Voting results
1	Christopher Schnell	"When I Was Your Man"	7	"She's Like the Wind"	Eliminated	14.5% (5/6)
2	Meltem Acikgöz	"Burn"	8	"Gangnam Style"	Bottom 3	15.3% (4/6)
3	Richard Schlögl	"Stark"	9	"Use Somebody"	Safe	17.8% (2/6)
4	Yasemin Kocak	"I Turn to You"	10	"Ain't Nobody"	Eliminated	14.0% (6/6)
5	Daniel Ceylan	"Bitte Hör' Nicht Auf Zu Träumen"	11	"(Simply) The Best"	Bottom 4	16.7% (3/6)
6	Aneta Sablik	"I'm Outta Love"	12	"I Need Your Love"	Safe	21.7% (1/6)

=== Top 4 - "Live-Challenge-Show: Semi-Final" ===
Instead of a double elimination the semi-final featured an elimination of only one contestant, leaving three contestant in the final. The challenge of the fifth live-challenge show was staging the beginning of one of their songs by themselves.

Original airdate: 26 April 2014

Order	Contestant	First Song	Order	Challenge song	Result	Voting results
1	Meltem Acikgöz	"Just Give Me a Reason"	5	"My Immortal"	Safe	25.4% (2/4)
2	Daniel Ceylan	"How Am I Supposed to Live Without You"	6	"For You"	Bottom 2	23.2% (3/4)
3	Aneta Sablik	"Wake Me Up"	7	"Survivor"	Safe	30.8% (1/4)
4	Richard Schlögl	"Halt dich an mir fest"	8	"Lila Wolken"	Eliminated	20.7% (4/4)

=== Top 3 - "Live-Challenge-Show: Final" ===
Original airdate: 3 May 2014

It was announced that each contestant had to write their winner's single by themselves. After the first performance one of the finalists will be eliminated and the remaining two contestants will compete for the crone.

Round 1

Order	Contestant	Contestants' Choice Song	Result	Voting results
1	Meltem Acikgöz	"Dark Horse"	Bottom 2	29.3% (2/3)
2	Daniel Ceylan	"I Won't Let You Go"	Eliminated	27.1% (3/3)
3	Aneta Sablik	"If I Were a Boy"	Safe	43.6% (1/3)

Round 2

Order	Contestant	Highlight Song^{1}	Order	Winner's Single^{1}	Result	Voting result
1	Meltem Acikgöz	"Skyscraper"	3	"Explosion In My Heart"	Runner-Up	42.1% (2/2)
2	Aneta Sablik	"Dirty Diana"	4	"The One"	Winner	57.9% (1/2)

^1 Daniel Ceylan would have performed "(Simply) The Best" and "Someone Out There to Love".

=== Winner of the challenges ===
Challenge	Date	Winner	Price	Task
Dance-Challenge	29. March	Sophia Akkara	Car	Dance sequence
Band Night	5. April	Meltem Acikgöz	Car	Vocal emphasis
Duets	12. April	Aneta Sablik	Car	Duet
Do Your Own Thing!	19. April	Daniel Ceylan	Car	New interpretation of a song
Staging your song	26. April	Meltem Acikgöz	Car	Staging of the beginning of their song
Final^{1}	3. Mai	Aneta Sablik	Car, music contract, and €500,000	Write their winner's single by themselves

^1 The winner of the last challenge was announced by the public and not by the judges like the previous challenges.

== Elimination chart ==
Females	Males	Top 15	Top 12	Winner

Did not perform	Safe	Most votes	Safe First	Safe Last	Eliminated

Stage:		Finals								
Week:		3/29			4/5	4/12	4/19	4/26	5/3	
Week:		Wild Card	Round 1	Round 2	4/5	4/12	4/19	4/26	Round 1	Round 2
Place	Contestant	Result								
1	Aneta Sablik	—		1st 24.2%	1st 14.9%	1st 17.2%	1st 21.7%	1st 30.8%	1st 43.6%	Winner; 57.9%
2	Meltem Acikgöz	—		4th 16.7%	4th 10.6%	3rd 13.8%	4th 15.3%	2nd 25.4%	2nd 29.3%	Runner-up; 42.1%
3	Daniel Ceylan	—	4th 15.8%		7th 8.2%	6th 11.1%	3rd 16.7%	3rd 23.2%	3rd 27.1%	
4	Richard Schlögl	—		5th 12.3%	5th 9.2%	4th 13.4%	2nd 17.8%	4th 20.7%		
5	Christopher Schnell	—		2nd 19.6%	2nd 14.4%	2nd 14.5%	5th 14.5%			
6	Yasemin Kocak	Top 12		3rd 16.8%	8th 8.2%	5th 11.3%	6th 14.0%			
7	Elif Batman	Top 12	1st 31.1%		3rd 12.1%	7th 10.4%				
8	Enrico von Krawczynski	—	3rd 16.9%		6th 8.4%	8th 8.2%				
9	Vanessa Valera-Rojas	—	2nd 19.2%		9th 7.1%					
10	Alessandro Di Lella	—	5th 8.8%		10th 6.9%					
11-12	Larissa Melody Haase	—		6th 10.4%						
11-12	Sophia Akkara	—	6th 8.3%							
13-15	Angelo Bugday	Elim								
13-15	Maxi Perez-Bursian	Elim								
13-15	Anita Latifi	Elim								
