= Ich bin ein Star – Holt mich hier raus! season 13 =

Ich bin ein Star – Holt mich hier raus!
- Season 13
- Presented by: Sonja Zietlow; Daniel Hartwich
- No. of days: 16
- No. of contestants: 12
- Winner: Evelyn Burdecki
- Runner-up: Felix van Deventer
- No. of episodes: 16

Release
- Original network: RTL
- Original release: 11 January – 26 January 2019

Season chronology
- ← Previous; Season 12 Next → Season 14

The thirteenth season of Ich bin ein Star – Holt mich hier raus!, the German version of the reality television show I'm a Celebrity...Get Me Out of Here!, began on 11 January 2019, and was broadcast till 26 January 2019, on RTL Television.

Sonja Zietlow and Daniel Hartwich were the hosts as in the years 2013 to 2018. Also the paramedic Bob McCarron alias "Dr. Bob" was back.

== Contestants ==
Place	Contestant	Famous for being ...	Result
1	Evelyn Burdecki	Reality TV actress, contestant (Promi Big Brother, Der Bachelor, Bachelor in Paradise)	Winner on 27 January 2019
2	Felix van Deventer	Actor (Gute Zeiten, schlechte Zeiten)	Runner-Up on 27 January 2019
3	Peter Orloff	Schlager singer and composer	Third place on 27 January 2019
4	Sandra Kiriasis	Olympic athlete Bobsleigh at the 2006 Winter Olympics	Eliminated 9th on 26 January 2019
5	Bastian Yotta	Reality TV performer (Adam sucht Eva – Gestrandet im Paradies, Die Yottas! Mit Vollgas durch Amerika)	Eliminated 8th on 26 January 2019
6	Chris Töpperwien	Reality TV performer (Goodbye Deutschland! Die Auswanderer, Das Sommerhaus der Stars – Kampf der Promipaare)	Eliminated 7th on 26 January 2019
7	Doreen Dietel	Actress (Mädchen, Mädchen 2 – Loft oder Liebe, Dahoam is Dahoam)	Eliminated 6th on 24 January 2019
8	Leila Lowfire	Sex expert, podcaster, actress and model	Eliminated 5th on 23 January 2019
9	Gisele Oppermann	Contestant (Germany's Next Topmodel)	Eliminated 4th on 22 January 2019
10	Tommi Piper	Voice actor (German voice of ALF), actor, singer	Eliminated 3rd on 21 January 2019
11	Sibylle Rauch	Pornographic film, actress (Eis am Stiel)	Eliminated 2nd on 20 January 2019
12	Domenico de Cicco	Reality TV actor, contestant (Die Bachelorette, Bachelor in Paradise)	Eliminated 1st on 19 January 2019

== Results and elimination ==
Indicates that the celebrity received the most votes from the public
Indicates that the celebrity received the fewest votes and was eliminated immediately (no bottom two)
Indicates that the celebrity was in the bottom two of the public vote

Daily results per celebrity
	Day 8	Day 9	Day 10	Day 11	Day 12	Day 13	Day 14*	Day 15	Day 16 Final	
	Day 8	Day 9	Day 10	Day 11	Day 12	Day 13	Day 14*	Day 15	Round 1	Round 2
Evelyn	1st 19.63%	3rd 17.49%	1st 20.41%	3rd 16.71%	1st 23.86%	1st 31.77%	1st 28.50%	1st 29.41%	1st 46.14%	Winner; 60.45%
Felix	6th 8.62%	1st 18.79%	4th 13.83%	4th 9.75%	5th 10.64%	5th 11.93%	3rd 15.44%	2nd 24.44%	2nd 28.54%	Runner-Up; 39.55%
Peter	5th 8.71%	6th 7.45%	5th 11.20%	5th 8.60%	2nd 23.13%	3rd 15.32%	2nd 16.21%	3rd 17.09%	3rd 25.32%	Eliminated (Day 16)
Sandra	7th 5.13%	7th 5.18%	7th 4.70%	6th 4.77%	7th 4.81%	6th 5.72%	5th 13.15%	4th 15.76%	Eliminated (Day 15)	
Bastian	3rd 11.84%	4th 11.27%	2nd 18.06%	1st 29.83%	3rd 12.39%	2nd 16.39%	4th 14.81%	5th 13.30%	Eliminated (Day 15)	
Chris	2nd 18.60%	2nd 17.56%	3rd 16.35%	2nd 19.72%	4th 12.20%	4th 13.56%	6th 11.89%	Eliminated (Day 15)		
Doreen	8th 4.42%	5th 8.00%	6th 5.47%	8th 3.22%	6th 8.47%	7th 5.31%	Eliminated (Day 13)			
Leila	9th 3.88%	10th 3.49%	8th 3.51%	7th 4.58%	8th 4.50%	Eliminated (Day 12)				
Gisele	4th 10.40%	8th 5.09%	9th 3.25%	9th 2.82%	Eliminated (Day 11)					
Tommi	11th 2.93%	9th 3.79%	10th 3.22%	Eliminated (Day 10)						
Sibylle	10th 2.95%	11th 1.89%	Eliminated (Day 9)							
Domenico	12th 2.89%	Eliminated (Day 8)								
Bottom two	Domenico, Tommi	Leila, Sibylle	Gisele, Tommi	Doreen, Gisele	Leila, Sandra	Doreen, Sandra	None			
Eliminated	Domenico; 2.89% to save	Sibylle; 1.89% to save	Tommi; 3.22% to save	Gisele; 2.82% to save	Leila; 4.50% to save	Doreen; 5.31% to save	Chris; 11.89% to save	Bastian; 13.30% to save	Peter; 25.32% to win	Felix; 39.55% to win
Eliminated	Domenico; 2.89% to save	Sibylle; 1.89% to save	Tommi; 3.22% to save	Gisele; 2.82% to save	Leila; 4.50% to save	Doreen; 5.31% to save	Chris; 11.89% to save	Sandra; 15.76% to save	Peter; 25.32% to win	Evelyn; 60.45% to win

- On day 14 none of the celebrities were eliminated because of technical issues. The votes were counted for day 15. On day 15 the celebrity with the fewest votes from the day before was eliminated at the start of the show and at the end two other celebrities were eliminated.

== Bushtucker Trials ==
Date	Contestant(s)	Trial	Earned rations (stars)
10 January 2019	Tommi Piper; Bastian Yotta; Evelyn Burdecki; Gisele Oppermann; Doreen Dietel; Felix van Deventer; Peter Orloff; Leila Lowfire	"Willkommen auf der Planke" ("welcome on the plank")	(Evelyn, Felix, Leila, Peter, Gisele, Doreen, Tommi/Bastian)
10 January 2019	Sandra Kiriasis; Chris Töpperwien; Domenico de Cicco; Sibylle Rauch	"Star(t)schuss" ("star(t) shot)	(Chris, Sandra)
11 January 2019	All	"Dschungel-Kantine" ("jungle-cafeteria")	(Leila, Bastian, Sybille, Peter, Domenico, Gisele, Evelyn, Doreen, Tommi, Sandra, Felix, Chris)
12 January 2019	Gisele Oppermann	"Kanal Fatal" ("canal-fatal")	5/6 stars 0/6 stars
13 January 2019	Gisele Oppermann	"Abgewrackt" ("scrapped")	(trial refused)
14 January 2019	Gisele Oppermann; Chris Töpperwien	"Klinik unter Palmen" ("clinic under palms")	8/12 stars
15 January 2019	Gisele Oppermann; Bastian Yotta	"Mitgehangen, mitgefangen" ("hang together, stuck together")	(trial refused by Oppermann)
16 January 2019	Gisele Oppermann; Bastian Yotta	"Spülhölle" ("flush hell")	4/6 stars
17 January 2019	Gisele Oppermann	"Alarm in Cobra 11" ("alert in cobra 11")	(trial refused)
18 January 2019	Gisele Oppermann	"Schloss mit lustig" ("locked with fun")	7/12 stars
19 January 2019	Doreen Dietel; Felix van Deventer	"Zirkus Felido" ("circus Felido")	7/11 stars
20 January 2019	All	"Dschungel-Kolosseum" ("jungle-colosseum")	9/10 stars
21 January 2019	Bastian Yotta; Leila Lowfire; Sandra Kiriasis	"Sterneküche" ("star kitchen")	6/6 stars 3/3 stars
22 January	Peter Orloff	"Graus am See" ("Horror at the lake")	3/8 stars
23 January	Evelyn Burdecki; Bastian Yotta	"Kriech der Sterne" ("crawl of the stars")	0/7 stars
24 January	Felix van Deventer; Sandra Kiriasis	"Promi-Waschstrafe" ("celebrity wash-punishment")	4/6 stars
25 January	All	"Schwingerclub" ("swinger club")	(Bastian, Felix)
26 January	Peter Orloff	Appetizer: "Strong"	5/5 stars
26 January	Evelyn Burdecki	Main dish: "Full of Energy"	3/5 stars
26 January	Felix van Deventer	Dessert: "Healthy"	4/5 stars

=== Result table: Who Should go to the Bushtucker Trials? ===
Celebrity	Day 1	Day 2	Day 3	Day 4	Day 5	Day 6	Day 7
Evelyn	10.94%	10.16%	5.52%	7.84%	10.17%	8.94%	8.02%
Felix	6.23%	6.09%	3.21%	5.59%	4.29%	4.36%	4.03%
Peter	2.76%	1.76%	0.97%	1.83%	1.45%	1.39%	1.26%
Sandra	1.93%	2.58%	1.03%	2.21%	1.96%	1.84%	3.03%
Bastian	10.46%	16.08%	12.97%	24.58%	13.66%	15.67%	10.00%
Chris	6.32%	11.21%	25.66%	12.96%	7.88%	6.50%	8.31%
Doreen	3.70%	2.47%	1.93%	2.94%	2.11%	2.98%	2.15%
Leila	4.19%	3.26%	1.93%	3.57%	3.53%	2.91%	3.66%
Gisele	47.75%	40.00%	40.82%	32.16%	38.75%	46.85%	47.47%
Tommi	Blocked	Blocked	1.44%	Blocked	2.14%	Blocked	1.95%
Sybille	Blocked	Blocked	2.17%	Blocked	1.67%	Blocked	2.04%
Domenico	5.72%	6.39%	2.35%	6.32%	12.39%	8.56%	8.08%

=== Statistics ===
Celebrity	Trials	Awarded stars	Possible stars	Percentage	Stars
Evelyn	6	5	15	33.33%	5/15 stars
Felix	7	19	26	73.07%	19/26 stars
Peter	6	11	14	78.57%	11/14 stars
Bastian	9	17	31	54.83%	17/31 stars
Sandra	6	9	13	69.23%	9/13 stars
Chris	5	5	10	50.00%	5/10 stars
Doreen	4	10	14	71.42%	10/14 stars
Leila	4	12	12	100.00%	12/12 stars
Gisele	10	18	45	40.35%	18/45 stars
Tommi	3	2	3	66.667%	2/3 stars
Sibylle	2	1	2	50.0%	1/2 stars
Domenico	2	1	2	50.0%	1/2 stars

== Ratings ==
Ratings of season 13
Episode	Duration (without advertising)	Date	Viewers Total	Market share Total	Viewers 14 to 49 years	Market share 14 to 49 years	Source
Episodes: "Who Should go to the Bushtucker Trials?"
Episode 1	146 Min.	11 January 2019	5.95 Mio.	23.1%	3.33 Mio.	38.7%	(Note: Daniel Sallhoff (12 January 2019). "Freitag, 11. Januar 2019". Ratingsmeter.de.)
Episode 2	82 Min.	12 January 2019	5.17 Mio.	21.2%	2.81 Mio.	33.9%	(Note: Timo Nöthling (13 January 2019). "Samstag, 12. Januar 2019". Ratingsmeter.de.)
Episode 3	75 Min.	13 January 2019	4.43 Mio.	19.1%	2.43 Mio.	31.0%	(Note: Sidney Schering (14 January 2019). "Dschungelcamp rutscht unter 20-Prozent-Marke". Ratingsmeter.de.)
Episode 4	89 Min.	14 January 2019	4.63 Mio.	24.4 %	2.28 Mio.	36.4%	
Episode 5	87 Min.	15 January 2019	5.03 Mio.	25.0%	2.67 Mio.	41.3%	
Episode 6	54 Min.	16 January 2019	5.34 Mio.	24.2%	2.88 Mio.	38.5%	(Note: Timo Nöthling (17 January 2019). "Starker Dschungel hilft schwächelndem "Bachelor"". Ratingsmeter.de.)
Episode 7	80 Min.	17 January 2019	5.22 Mio.	26.5%	2.76 Mio.	42.3%	
Episodes: "Who should stay in the camp?"
Episode 8	84 Min.	18 January 2019	5.44 Mio.	23.8%	2.69 Mio.	35.8%	
Episode 9	72 Min.	19 January 2019	6.17 Mio.	24.8%	3.15 Mio.	38.2%	
Episode 10	80 Min.	20 January 2019	4.75 Mio.	21.4%	2.35 Mio.	31.3%	
Episode 11	92 Min.	21 January 2019	5.03 Mio.	25.9%	2.59 Mio.	40,2 %	
Episode 12	81 Min.	22 January 2019	4.86 Mio.	25.8%	2.36 Mio.	39.2%	
Episode 13	58 Min.	23 January 2019	5.12 Mio.	23.4%	2.47 Mio.	33.8%	
Episode 14	69 Min.	24 January 2019	4.87 Mio.	24.2%	2.49 Mio.	38.8%	
Episode 15	58 Min.	25 January 2019	5.52 Mio.	21.8%	2.85 Mio.	32.4%	
Final
Episode 16	119 Min.	26 January 2019	6.35 Mio.	29.4%	3.09 Mio.	39.9%	
The big reunion
		27 January 2019					
