= Deutschland sucht den Superstar season 13 =

Deutschland sucht den Superstar
- Season 13
- Hosted by: Oliver Geissen (Event shows only)
- Judges: Dieter Bohlen; H.P. Baxxter; Michelle; Vanessa Mai
- Winner: Prince Damien Ritzinger
- Runner-up: Laura van den Elzen
- Finals venue: ISS Dome, Düsseldorf

Release
- Original network: RTL
- Original release: 2 January – 7 May 2016

Season chronology
- ← Previous; Season 12 Next → Season 14

The thirteenth season of Deutschland sucht den Superstar was broadcast on German channel RTL from 2 January to 7 May 2016. It was won by Prince Damien Ritzinger.

== History ==
During the live shows of season 12, it was announced that the castings for season 13 would start in August 2015. In the final, Dieter Bohlen announced that for this season all previous limits such as the age restriction are repealed. Accordingly, the motto of the season is “No Limits”. In late 2014, RTL gave closer details to the changes of season 13. The live shows are replaced with pre-recorded concerts in clubs in Germany. Only the announcement of the results will be broadcast live. Like the season before, the final will not take place in a TV studio in Cologne, but in the ISS Dome in Düsseldorf.

In 2015, RTL announced that DJ Antoine, Mandy Capristo, and Heino won't return for the thirteenth season. The new jury consists of Dieter Bohlen, H.P. Baxxter, Michelle and Vanessa Mai. Prince Damien Ritzinger was announced as the winner on 7 May 2016, with Laura van den Elzen finishing as the runner-up.

=== Auditions and "Recall" ===
Start of the season was on Saturday, 2 January 2016. In the casting rounds, each candidate selected before the show from a Golden CD with the name of the juror, whose voice should be the deciding factor for advancement or leaving a draw jury voting. Menderes reached the fourth time the "Recall". There is a "Quick Pick" was held where each candidate had to sing again. RTL did not broadcast this Germany-Recall. Instead, only a short scene was shown in which piles announced that the 32 pre-worn Recall of the 110 candidates in Thailand-Recall were.

=== "Re-recall" ===
The Recall in Jamaica was reached by 16 women and 16 men. The contestants were separated into three to four groups by each gender for the first four performances. In the last round, the remaining contestants sang in duets where afterward the judges then decided the Top 10.

== Finalists ==
The finalist was announced on 9 April and consisted of six male and four (five) female contestants.

Place	Contestant	Age	Occupation	Origin
Winner (won at ISS Dome)	Prince Damien Ritzinger	25	Dance teacher	South Africa
2 (eliminated at ISS Dome)	Laura van den Elzen	18	Student	Netherlands
3 (eliminated at ISS Dome)	Thomas Katrozan	35	Sound engineer	Germany
4-6 (eliminated at Landschaftspark Duisburg-Nord)	Anita Wiegand	17	Student	Germany
4-6 (eliminated at Landschaftspark Duisburg-Nord)	Igor Barbosa	19	Student	Portugal
4-6 (eliminated at Landschaftspark Duisburg-Nord)	Mark Hoffmann	19	Student	China
7-9 (eliminated at Eberbach Abbey)	Ramona Mihajilovic^1	17	Supermarket employee	Germany
7-9 (eliminated at Eberbach Abbey)	Sandra Berger	28	Child care worker	Germany
7-9 (eliminated at Eberbach Abbey)	Tobias Soltau	19	Trainee	Germany
10 (eliminated at Merkers Adventure Mines)	Aytug Gün	27	Child care worker	Turkey
11 (Withdrawn)	Angelika Turo^1	27	Dentist aider	Germany

^1 Angelika Turo who originally made it to the Top 10 left the competition on 14 April after she announced her pregnancy. Ramona Mihajilovic than took her place.

== Event shows ==
The event shows were held from 16 April to 7 May 2016 with three pre-recorded shows and a live final. The voting results were published right after the final.

Color key

Contestant received the fewest votes and was eliminated
Contestant was in the bottom two, three or four
Contestant received the most votes from the public
Contestant was announced as the season's winner

=== Top 10 - Merkers Adventure Mines ===
Original airdate: 16 April 2016

The first event show was held in Merkers Adventure Mines and was pre-recorded on 13 April 2016. The live result show at Eberbach Abbey was aired directly after the event show. At the beginning of the show, it was announced that only one contestant would leave the show this week. Also, Angelika Turo performed out of competition at the end of the show.

Order	Contestant	Song	Result	Voting result
1	Laura van den Elzen	"I Love Rock 'n' Roll" - Britney Spears	Safe	10.61% (3/10)
2	Tobias Soltau	"Herz Über Kopf" - Joris	Bottom two	4.37% (9/10)
3	Mark Hoffmann	"Unter die Haut" - Tim Bendzko	Safe	8.33% (6/10)
4	Aytug Gün	"Sugar" - Robin Schulz feat. Francesco Yates	Eliminated	3.97% (10/10)
5	Sandra Berger	"Diese Nacht ist jede Sünde wert" - Andrea Berg	Safe	5.51% (8/10)
6	Thomas Katrozan	"Sexy" - Marius Müller-Westernhagen	Safe	9.41% (4/10)
7	Anita Wiegand	"Addicted to You" - Avicii	Safe	24.88% (1/10)
8	Igor Barbosa	"Pillowtalk" - Zayn	Safe	6.78% (7/10)
9	Prince Damien Ritzinger	"Ich will nur, dass du weißt" - SDP feat. Adel Tawil	Safe	17.09% (2/10)
10	Ramona Mihajilovic	"Ex's & Oh's" - Elle King	Safe	9.05% (5/10)
11	Angelika Turo	"Ich will immer wieder dieses Fieber spür'n" - Helene Fischer	—N/a	

- Group performance: "Proper Education"

=== Top 9 - German Songs - Eberbach Abbey ===
Original airdate: 23 April 2016

The second event show was held in the Eberbach Abbey and will be pre-recorded on 20 April 2016. The live result show at Landschaftspark Duisburg-Nord was aired directly after the event show. Contestant Sandra Berger married her fiancé during the live show. Also, this week, every contestant had to perform a German song. The three contestants with the fewest votes were eliminated.

Order	Contestant	Song	Result	Voting result
1	Ramona Mihajilovic	"Lieblingsmensch" - Namika	Eliminated	4.91% (9/9)
2	Thomas Katrozan	"Aufstehn" - Seeed	Safe	8.46% (5/9)
3	Igor Barbosa	"Keine Rosen" - Teesy	Bottom four	8.05% (6/9)
4	Anita Wiegand	"Wenn das Liebe ist" - Glashaus	Safe	17.81% (2/9)
5	Laura van den Elzen	"Ich sterb für dich" - Vanessa Mai	Safe	17.24% (3/9)
6	Tobias Soltau	"Ich lass für dich das Licht an" - Revolverheld	Eliminated	5.92% (8/9)
7	Prince Damien Ritzinger	"Stimme" - Eff	Safe	21.89% (1/9)
8	Mark Hoffmann	"Ich will nur" - Philipp Poisel	Safe	9.54% (4/9)
9	Sandra Berger	"Unser Tag" - Helene Fischer	Eliminated	6.18% (7/9)

- Group performance: "Geiles Leben" - Glasperlenspiel

=== Top 6 - Semi-final - Landschaftspark Duisburg-Nord ===
Original airdate: 30 April 2016

The third event show was held in the Landschaftspark Duisburg-Nord and was pre-recorded on 27 April 2016. The live result show in ISS Dome was aired directly after the event show. Also, the six contestants had to perform in pairs in duets or as it was billed 'duells'. The three contestants with the fewest votes were eliminated.

Order	Contestant	Song	Result	Voting result
1	Laura van den Elzen & Anita Wiegand	"One Day in Your Life" - Anastacia	—N/a	
2	Thomas Katrozan & Mark Hoffmann	"Auf uns" - Andreas Bourani	—N/a	
3	Prince Damien Ritzinger & Igor Barbosa	"Alles brennt" - Johannes Oerding	—N/a	
4	Laura van den Elzen	"Proud Mary" - Tina Turner	Safe	23.09% (2/6)
5	Anita Wiegand	"Keiner ist wie du" - Sarah Connor	Eliminated	12.17% (4/6)
6	Thomas Katrozan	"König von Deutschland" - Rio Reiser	Bottom four	13.94% (3/6)
7	Mark Hoffmann	"Auf anderen Wegen" - Andreas Bourani	Eliminated	7.18% (6/6)
8	Igor Barbosa	"Was immer du willst" - Marlon Knauer	Eliminated	10.48% (5/6)
9	Prince Damien Ritzinger	"Unter meiner Haut" - Gestört aber GeiL, Koby Funk & Wincent Weiss	Safe	33.14% (1/6)

- Group performance: "Get Down Saturday Night" - Oliver Cheatham & "Wir heben ab"

=== Top 3 - Final - Düsseldorf ===
Original airdate: 7 May 2016

The Final was held live in Düsseldorf at the ISS Dome in front of 13,000 people on 7 May 2016. One Contestant was eliminated after the first performance. The other two performed their favorite performance and the winner's single.

Round 1

Order	Contestant	Song	Result	Voting result
1	Laura van den Elzen	"9 to 5" - Dolly Parton	Bottom two	24.07% (2/3)
2	Thomas Katrozan	"Dreadlock Holiday" - 10cc	Eliminated	23.81% (3/3)
3	Prince Damien Ritzinger	"Let It Go" - James Bay	Safe	52.12% (1/3)

Round 2

Order	Contestant	Song^1	Order	Song^1	Result	Voting result
1	Laura van den Elzen	"Black Velvet" - Alannah Myles	3	"Glücksmoment"	Runner-Up	34.46% (2/2)
2	Prince Damien Ritzinger	"Stimme" - Eff	4	"Glücksmoment"	Winner	65.54% (1/2)

^1Thomas Katrozan would have performed "Sexy" by Marius Müller-Westernhagen and "Glücksmoment".

== Elimination chart ==
Females	Males	Top 10	Winner

Safe	Most votes	Safe Last	Eliminated

Stage:		Finals				
Week:		4/16	4/23	4/30	5/7	
Week:		4/16	4/23	4/30	Round 1	Round 2
Place	Contestant	Result				
1	Prince Damien Ritzinger	2nd 17.09%	1st 21.89%	1st 33.14%	1st 52.12%	Winner; 65.54%
2	Laura van den Elzen	3rd 10.61%	3rd 17.24%	2nd 23.09%	2nd 24.07%	Runner-Up; 34.46%
3	Thomas Katrozan	4th 9.41%	5th 8.46%	3rd 13.94%	3rd 23.81%	
4	Anita Wiegand	1st 24.88%	2nd 17.81%	4th 12.17%		
5	Igor Barbosa	7th 6.78%	6th 8.05%	5th 10.48%		
6	Mark Hoffmann	6th 8.33%	4th 9.54%	6th 7.18%		
7	Sandra Berger	8th 5.51%	7th 6.18%			
8	Tobias Soltau	9th 4.37%	8th 5.92%			
9	Ramona Mihajilovic	5th 9.05%	9th 4.91%			
10	Aytug Gün	10th 3.97%				
11	Angelika Turo	Withdraw				

- Angelika Turo, who originally made it to the Top 10, left the competition on 14 April after announcing her pregnancy. Ramona Mihajilovic took her place.
