= Hochschule Wismar =

Hochschule in Wismar, Germany

Coordinates: 53°53′24″N 11°26′45″E

- Hochschule Wismar, University of Applied Sciences: Technology, Business and Design
- Motto: Mit allen Wassern gewaschen
- Motto in English: Being Shrewd
- Type: Public
- Established: 1908
- President: Bodo Wiegand-Hoffmeister
- Academic staff: 236
- Administrative staff: 256
- Students: 8,406 (in winter 2018)
- Location: Wismar, Germany
- Campus: Urban
- Colors
- Website: www.hs-wismar.de

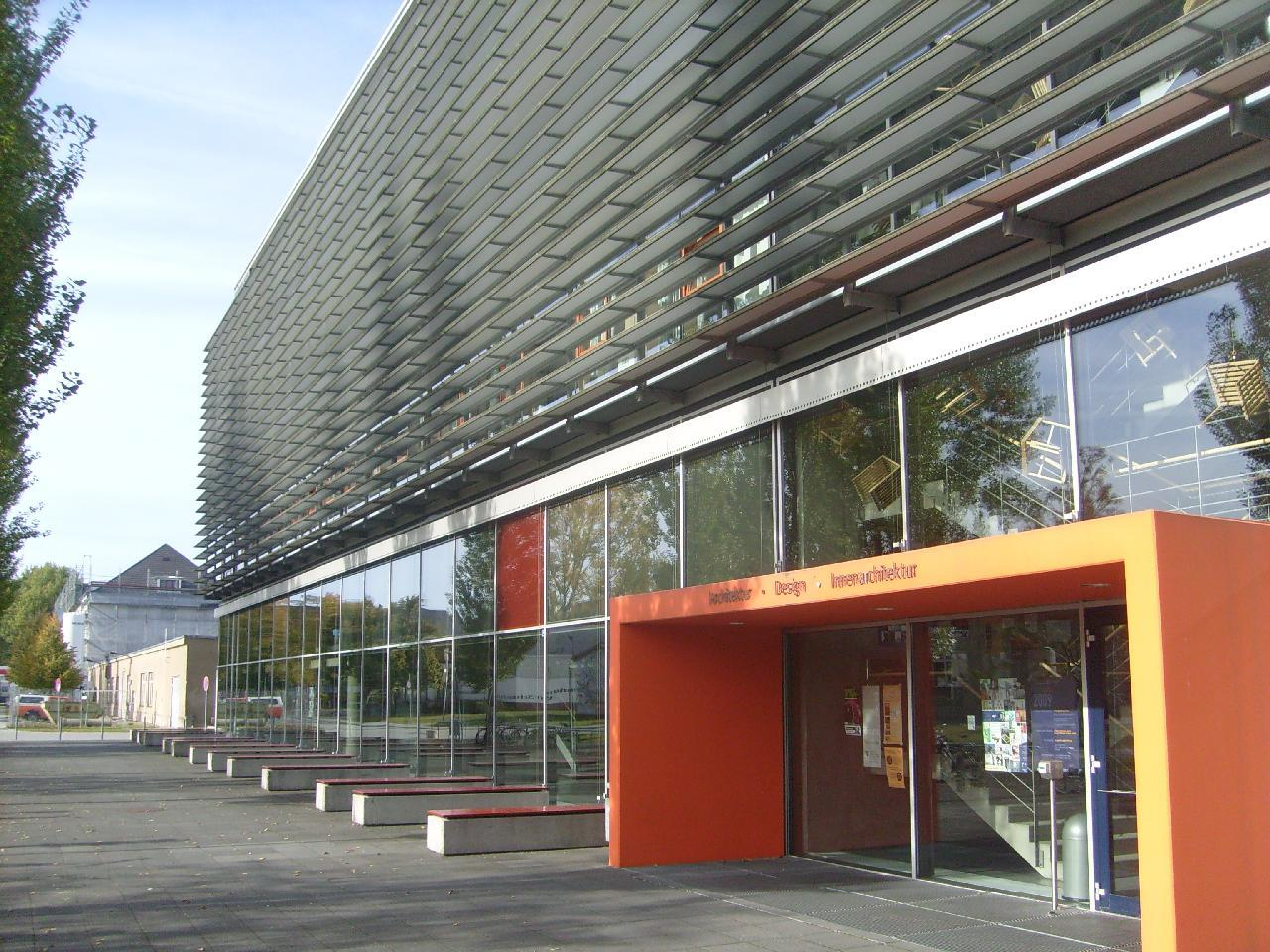
Hochschule Wismar - Faculty of Design

The Hochschule Wismar, University of Applied Sciences: Technology, Business and Design (or short: University of Wismar), is the third-biggest and third-oldest public university in Mecklenburg-Vorpommern, Germany. The university is situated at the Baltic coast in the very north of Germany with its campus being only 500 metres (550 yards) away from the harbor. The university was founded in 1908 as an engineering academy and has become an important part in the city's cultural life.

== History ==
Hochschule Wismar – University of Applied Sciences: Technology, Business and Design was founded on May 9, 1908, as the private Ingenieur-Akademie Wismar by architect Robert Schmidt. The academy initially offered courses in architecture, civil engineering, mechanical engineering, and electrical engineering, with 13 students enrolling in its first semester.

In 1922, the academy became a municipal institution under the City of Wismar. In 1937, the civil engineering department was separated, and an aviation engineering program was introduced. A special flight technology unit operated during World War II .

After World War II, the academy underwent several reorganisations. In 1969, the Ingenieurhochschule Wismar was established as a technical institution. In 1988, it became the Technische Hochschule Wismar.

On October 1, 1992, the university was reconstituted under the regional higher education reform as Hochschule Wismar – Fachhochschule für Technik, Wirtschaft und Gestaltung, integrating maritime studies (from Warnemünde-Wustrow) and the school of applied arts from Heiligendamm.

In 2003, it adopted its current English name, Hochschule Wismar – University of Applied Sciences: Technology, Business and Design. It remains one of Mecklenburg-Vorpommern’s oldest and largest universities of applied sciences.

== Academics ==
Since a structural reorganization in 2007, Hochschule Wismar has been organized into three faculties corresponding to the areas indicated in its official name—technology, business, and design:

- Faculty of Engineering: Includes programs in mechanical engineering, process and environmental engineering, civil engineering, electrical engineering, multimedia engineering, and maritime studies.
- Faculty of Business (Wismar Business School): Offers degree programs in business administration, business law, and business informatics.
- Faculty of Design: Covers fields such as architecture, interior architecture, product and industrial design, and communication design.

The university offers more than 50 degree programs, including part-time and distance learning formats. The distance learning programs are administered through WINGS (Wismar International Graduation Services), a subsidiary of Hochschule Wismar.

Programs in maritime studies are partly offered in cooperation with the European Cruise Academy.

Most bachelor's programs require six to seven semesters of study. Master's programs generally take three to four semesters to complete. A completed master's degree (usually following five years of higher education) qualifies graduates to pursue doctoral studies, often in cooperation with partner universities.

== International Cooperations ==
The University of Wismar collaborates with 141 partner universities from 45 countries, including:

- Northern Business School, Hamburg
- AIDA Cruises, European Cruise Academy, Rostock
- Deutsche Gesellschaft für Internationale Zusammenarbeit (GIZ), Bonn
- University of Szczecin
- Cape Peninsula University of Technology, Cape Town
- Institut Teknologi Sepuluh Nopember, Surabaya, Indonesia
- European Centre for Engineering and Business Education (ECEBE)
- Dept. of Electronic & Computer Engineering of the University of Limerick (Limerick, Ireland)
- School of Computing and Mathematical Sciences of the John Moores University (Liverpool, England)
- Tokyo University of Science (Tokyo, Japan)
- Gujarat Technological University (Ahmedabad, India)
- Centre for Management and Information Technology (CMIT) (Hyderabad, India)
- Södertörns Högskola (Stockholm, Sweden)

== See also ==
- Education in Germany
- List of universities in Germany
