= Family of the Year discography =

- Studio albums: 4
- EPs: 4
- Singles: 5

Family of the Year has released 4 full-length albums, 4 EPs, and 5 singles.

== Albums ==
=== Studio albums ===
Title	Album details	Peak chart positions							Sales
Title	Album details	US Heat	US Folk	BEL (FL)	GER	SWI	UK	UK Indie	Sales
Songbook	Released: 17 November 2009 (North America); Released: 2010 (EU) as Our Songbook; Label: Washashore Records; Format: CD, digital download	—	—	80	—	—	—	—	
Loma Vista	Released: 10 July 2012; Label: Nettwerk; Format: CD, digital download, vinyl	35	23	77	31	80	183	30	US: 32,000
Family of the Year	Released: 7 August 2015 (Spotify); Label: Nettwerk; Format: Digital download	—	24	146	—	—	—	—	
Goodbye Sunshine, Hello Nighttime	Released: 18 May 2018; Label: Reprise Records; Format: CD, digital download, vinyl	—	—	—	—	—	—	—	
"—" denotes releases that did not chart.

=== EPs ===
Title	Album details
Where's The Sun	Released: 2009; Label: Washashore Records; Formats: digital download
Through The Trees	Released: 2010; Label: Washashore Records; Formats: digital download
St. Croix	Released: 2011; Label: Washashore Records; Formats: digital download
Diversity	Released: 2012; Label: Nettwerk; Formats: digital download

== Singles ==
Single	Year	Peak chart positions										Certifications	Album
Single	Year	US Rock	AUT	BEL (FL)	CAN	CZR	GER	NED	SPA	SWI	UK	Certifications	Album
"OMG It's Xmas"	2011	—	—	—	—	—	—	—	—	—	—		Non-album single
"St. Croix"	2012	—	—	— (Note: "St. Croix" did not enter the Flanders Ultratop 50, but peaked at 22 on the Ultratip chart.)	—	—	—	—	—	— (Note: "St. Croix" did not enter the Swiss Singles chart, but charted at number 85 on the Swiss Airplay chart.)	—		Loma Vista
"Diversity"	2012	—	—	—	—	—	—	—	—	—	—		Loma Vista
"Hero"	2012	25	7	6	61	83	7	20	72	6	178	RIAA: Platinum; BEA: Gold; BVMI: Platinum; IFPI SWI: Gold; MC: 2× Platinum; PROMUSICAE: Platinum	Loma Vista
"The Stairs"	2013	—	—	—	—	—	—	—	—	—	—		Loma Vista
"Make You Mine"	2015	—	—	— (Note: "Make You Mine" did not enter the Flanders Ultratop 50, but peaked at eight on the Ultratip chart.)	—	—	—	—	—	—	—		Family of the Year
"Carry Me"	2015	—	—	— (Note: "Carry Me" did not enter the Flanders Ultratop 50, but peaked at four on the Ultratip chart.)	—	—	—	—	—	—	—		Family of the Year
"NYE"	2015	—	—	—	—	—	—	—	—	—	—		Non-album single
"Hold Me Down"	2018	—	—	—	—	—	—	—	—	—	—		Goodbye Sunshine, Hello Nighttime
"Already Gone"	2019	—	—	—	—	—	—	—	—	—	—		Non-album single
"—" denotes a recording that did not chart or was not released in that territory.
