= Prince Damien =

German singer (born 1990)

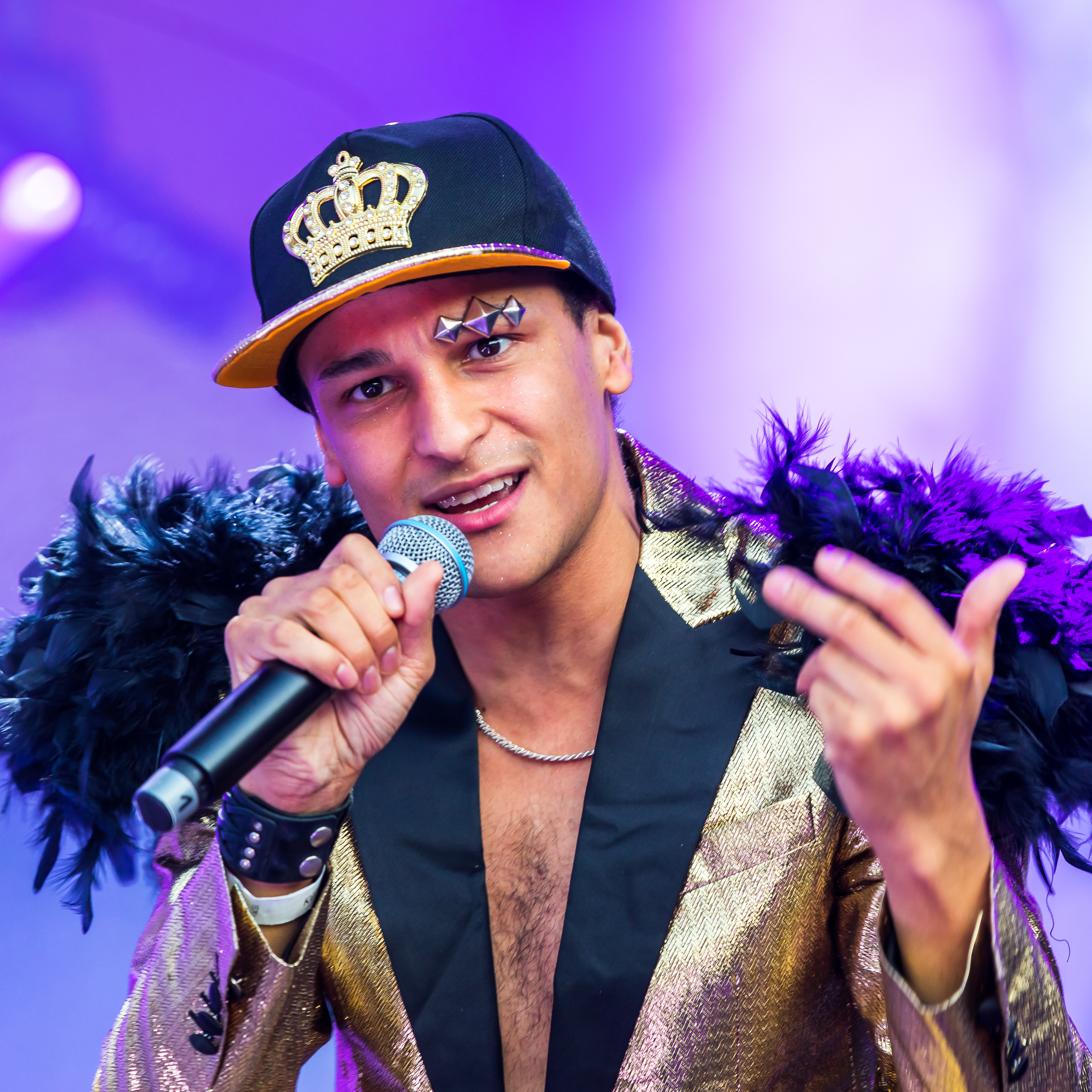
- Prince Damien in 2018

Background information
- Born: Messiah Prince Sheridan Damien Ritzinger; 12 December 1990 (age 35); Johannesburg, South Africa
- Origin: Munich, Germany
- Occupations: Singer, actor
- Years active: 2013–present

Messiah Prince Sheridan Damien Ritzinger (born 12 December 1990) is a German singer and actor.

== Biography ==
Ritzinger was born in Johannesburg, South Africa to a German father and South African mother. During his childhood, he lived in Munich.

In 2015, he took part in the twelfth season of the British series The X Factor. In the 'Bootcamp', he was eliminated. In May 2016, Ritzinger won season 13 of Deutschland sucht den Superstar, the German version of the Idol franchise. In January 2020, he won German reality show Ich bin ein Star – Holt mich hier raus!. During this show, he came out as bisexual.

== Singles ==
- 2013: "Easy Breezy und Deutsche Version"
- 2014: "When I Think of You"
- 2014: "Beep Me"
- 2016: "Glücksmoment"
- 2016: "Mich hält keiner auf"
