= Merkers Adventure Mines =

Tourist attraction in Thuringia, Germany

Coordinates: 50.819595°N 10.123605°E

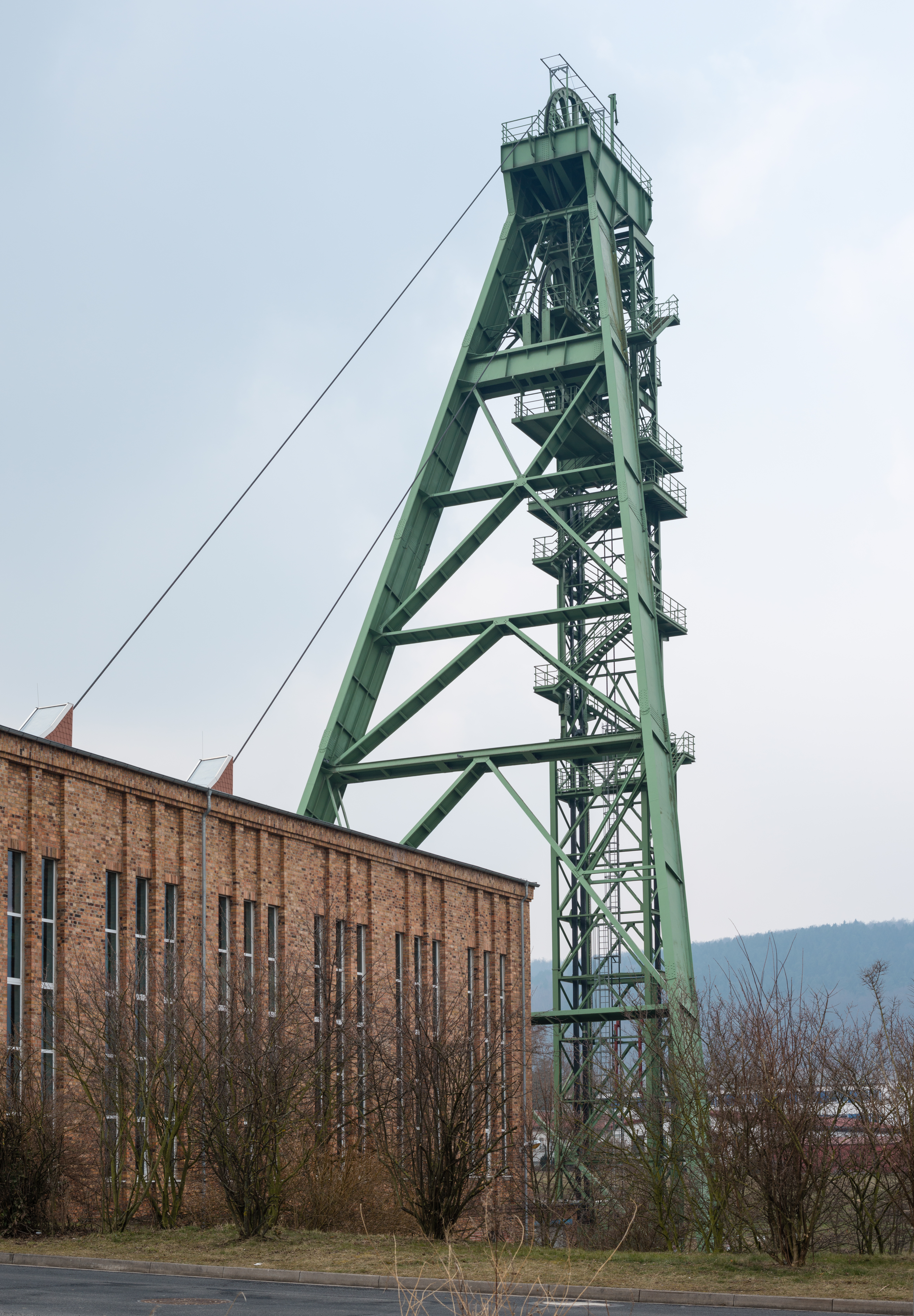
Erlebnisbergwerk Merkers- World of white gold

Merkers Adventure Mines are a visitor attraction in Krayenberggemeinde in the Wartburgkreis district of Thuringia, Germany, owned and operated by K+S AG of Kassel. They lie near the village of Merkers.

The mines have a long history of salt extraction, and are known for concealing large amounts of Nazi gold during World War II. A hundred tons of gold and many works of art presumed to be stolen were discovered by the liberating United States Army in 1945.

== Context ==
The Merkers Mine drops 860m below the surface into the 'Werra-Revier' band of potash bearing salt. There, at a constant temperature of 28C, are 4600 kilometers of tunnels. Visitors are lowered in the hoisting cage at over 10m/ sec (30 km/h) down to the 500m galleries. There they are driven on 20-kilometre long tour of the mine, seeing an underground mining museum, a room where in 1945 the 'Gold und Devisenreserven der Deutschen Reichbank' dubbed the Nazi gold was stored, the world's largest underground bucket-wheel excavator, simulated blasting and a laser show in the world's largest underground concert hall. Also, in 1980 a crystal grotto was discovered. Here visitors see enormous salt crystals, some over 1 m in size.

== Popular culture ==
The salt crystals of Merkers Mine are featured in Episode 2 of the BBC series, The Code. Merker's mines appear in PlayStation game Medal Of Honor.

Documents stolen (fictionally) from the Nazi hoard in the mine form the basis for the plot of the Len Deighton novel XPD.

== Gallery ==
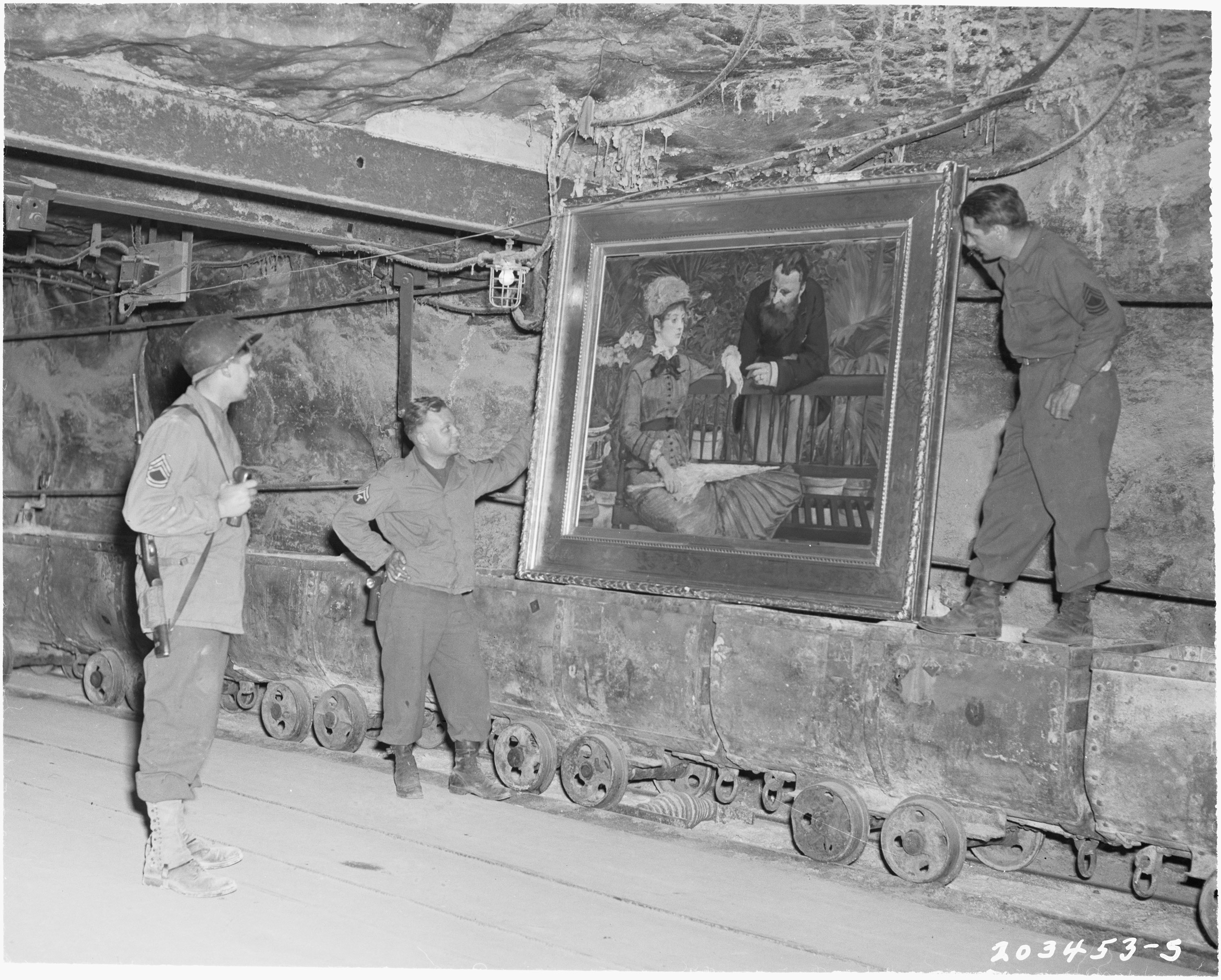
Manet's Wintergarden in safe keeping in 1945

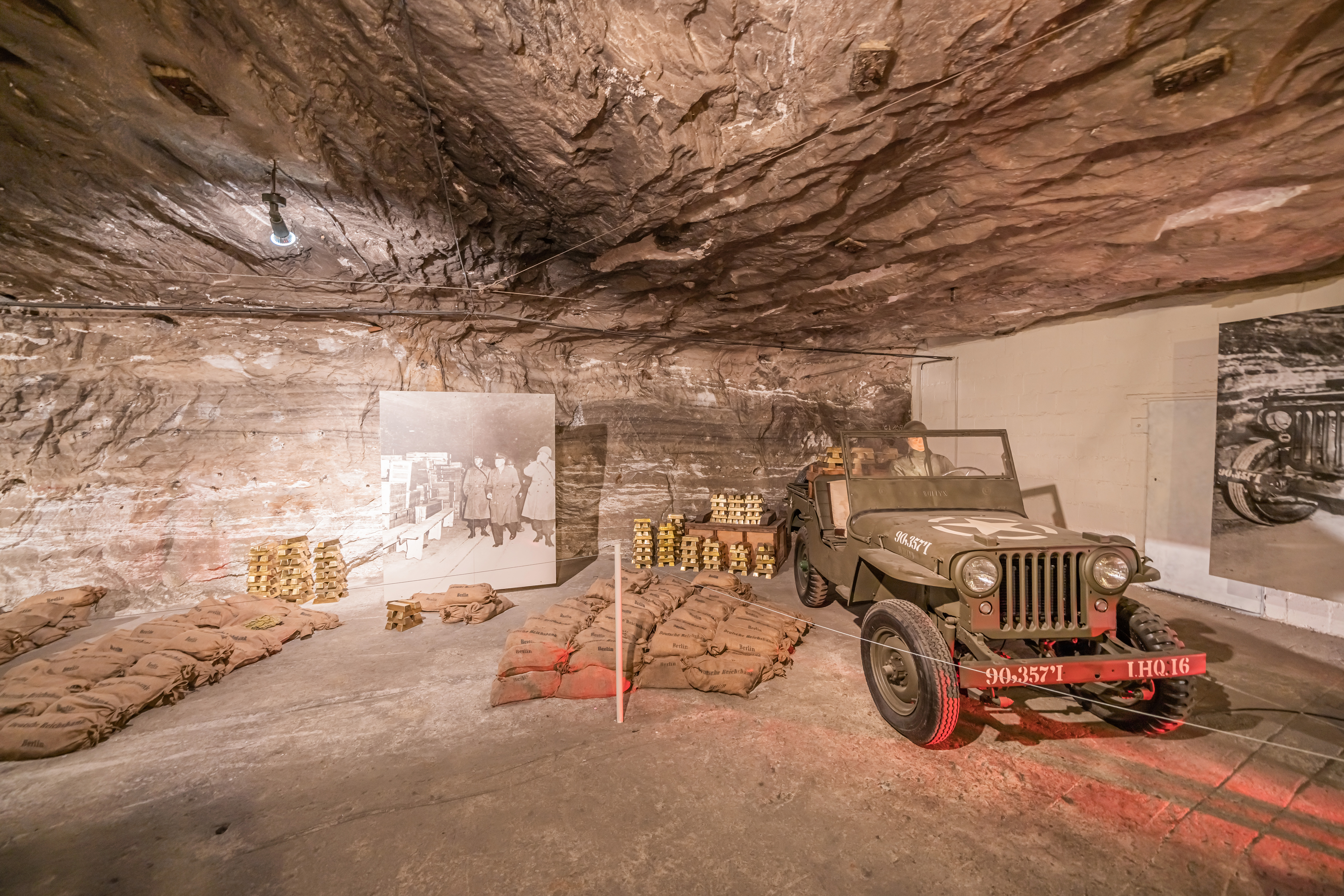
The Gold Room today

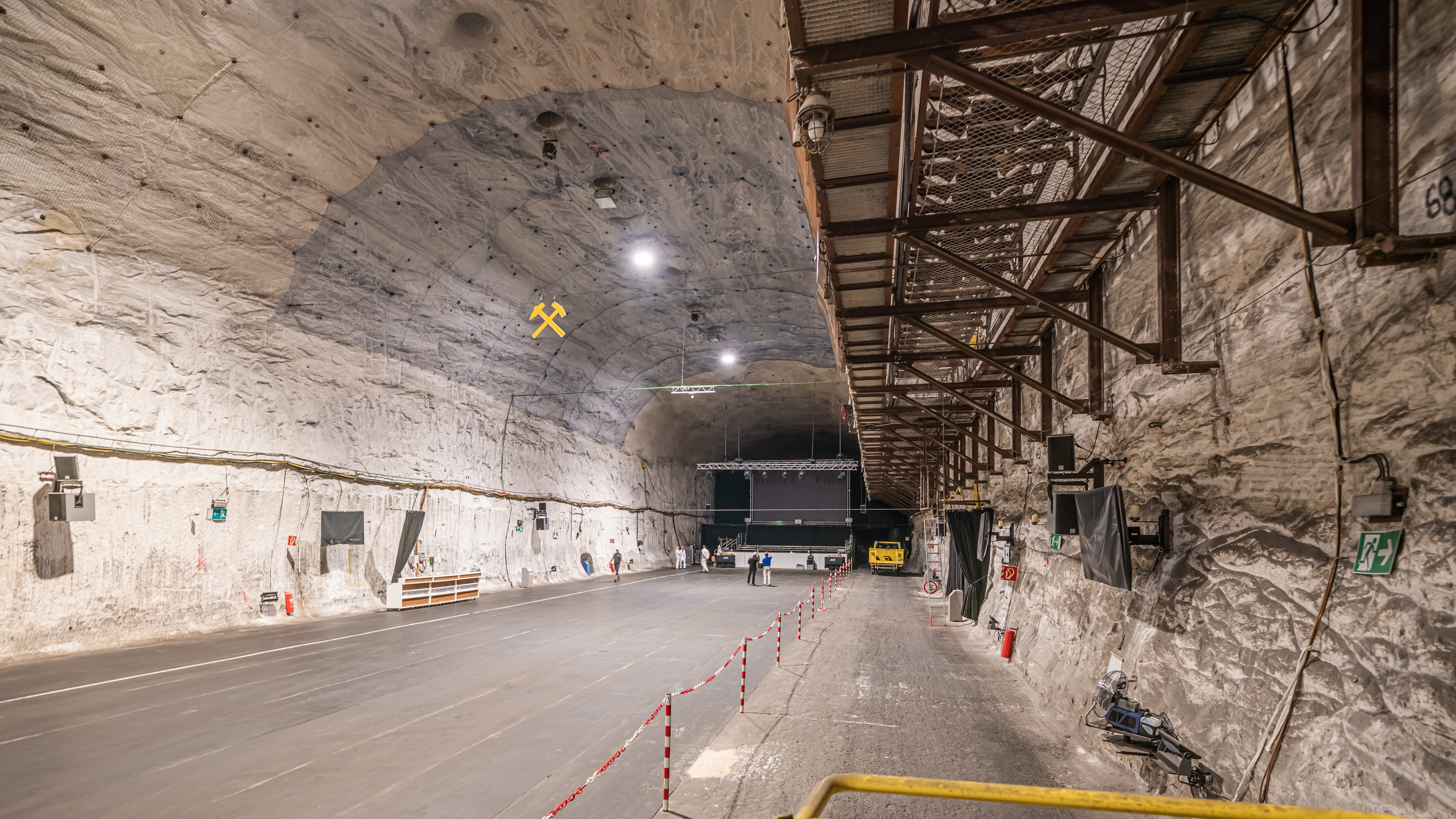
The "concert hall"

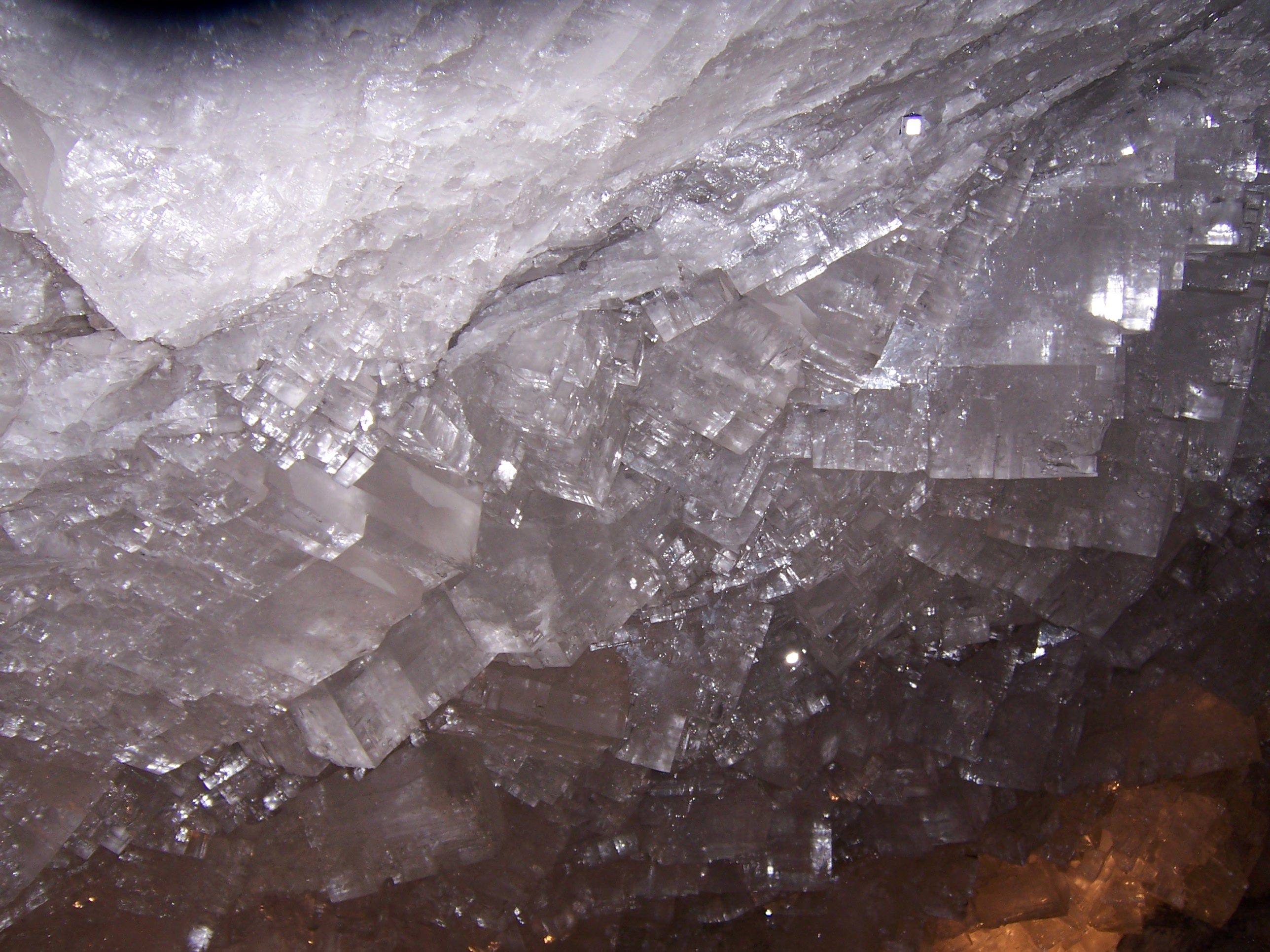
Salt crystals in the 1980 Crystal Grotto
