= 19 Recordings =

American record label

- Parent company: 19 Entertainment
- Founded: 1999; 27 years ago
- Founder: Simon Fuller
- Distributors: BMG (United States); Polydor Records (international)
- Genre: Various
- Country of origin: United States
- Location: New York City

19 Recordings Inc. is a New York–based record label owned by 19 Entertainment. Founded in London by British entrepreneur Simon Fuller in 1999 as the music division of 19 Entertainment, the label is one of the top record imprints as compiled by Billboard in 2012. 19 Recordings has the exclusive rights to sign contestants of the television series Idols. Since 2005, it shifted its main operations to the United States following CKX, Inc.'s (Industrial Media) acquisition of 19 Entertainment.

From 1999 to 2000, EMI distributed its recordings. From 2001 to 2004, releases by most of the artists signed to 19 Recordings were distributed by Bertelsmann Music Group (BMG). Following BMG's merger with Sony Music Entertainment to form Sony BMG, RCA Music Group distributed releases by 19 Recordings from 2005 to 2010. 19 Recordings partnered with Universal Music Group from 2011 to 2020, for distribution through Interscope Geffen A&M Records (2011–2014), Big Machine Records (2015–2016) and Disney Music Group (2017–2020).

In 2014, 19 Recordings sued Sony Music Entertainment for $10 million, alleging years of incorrect royalty payments and calculations, exploitation of master recording agreements, underreporting synchronization deals in television series and films, and improperly deducting money spent for music videos and advertisements.

As of 2021, 19 Recordings is partnered with BMG Rights Management.

== History ==
Fuller, who had previously managed the careers of musicians Annie Lennox, Cathy Dennis, and Spice Girls in the 1990s, founded 19 Recordings as the music division of 19 Entertainment. The first artist Fuller signed to 19 Recordings was the English indie band 21st Century Girls in 1999, who released its only single "21st Century Girls", which only peaked at the top 20 on the UK Singles Chart. The English pop group S Club 7, the second act to be signed to 19 Recordings and Polydor Records, achieved better success. S Club 7 went on to sell over 14 million albums worldwide until their disbandment in 2003. After disbanding in 1990, the British duo Eurythmics reunited in 1999 and was signed to RCA Records and 19 Recordings, and released their final studio album Peace (1999) to commercial success.

In 2001, Fuller created the singing competition series Pop Idol, which became an instant success in British television and has had international versions in over 48 countries. Pop Idol's first winner, Will Young was signed to 19 Recordings and RCA Records in 2002, became one of the most successful British recording artists of the 2000s. Young's debut single, ""Anything Is Possible"/"Evergreen" (2002), became the best-selling single of the 2000s, won a BRIT Award and an Ivor Novello Award. Other Pop Idol contestants signed with 19 Recordings include Gareth Gates, Sam & Mark, Michelle McManus, and Sarah Whatmore, had moderate success. 19 Recordings has since retained the exclusive rights to sign contestants of all versions of Idols around the world and has released compilation albums related to Idols ever since. In 2003, two members of the Spice Girls, Victoria Beckham and Emma Bunton, were signed to 19 Recordings and Polydor Records. Beckham released her final single "This Groove"/Let Your Head Go" (2003) and Bunton released her second album, Free Me (2003), to commercial success.

In 2002, American Idol, whose format was based on Pop Idol, became one of the most successful programs in the history of American television. Its first winner, Kelly Clarkson, was immediately signed to RCA Records and 19 Recordings in 2002 and became 19 Recordings' most successful artist with over 20 million albums sold worldwide. Clarkson's second studio album, Breakaway (2004), also became 19 Recordings' best-selling release with worldwide sales of over 12 million copies and has won two Grammy Awards in 2006; Breakaway, along with Young's second studio album, Friday's Child (2003), both became 19 Recordings' best-selling album in the United Kingdom with sales of over 1.5 million each. Clarkson's single "Stronger (What Doesn't Kill You)" (2012), also became 19 Recordings' best-selling single after selling over 5 million copies worldwide and has been nominated for 3 Grammy Awards, including Record of the Year and Song of the Year in 2013. Other contestants from American Idol, such as Ruben Studdard, Clay Aiken, Fantasia Barrino, Carrie Underwood, Daughtry, and Jordin Sparks, also followed suit with commercial success. Underwood's debut album Some Hearts (2005), became 19 Recordings's best-selling release in the United States with sales of 7 million copies.

Beginning in 2006, 19 Recordings also began to sign artists who were unrelated to Idols, such as Annie Lennox, Amy Studt, Orianthi, and Sons of Sylvia. 19 Recordings co-released The Annie Lennox Collection (2008) with RCA Records to commercial success. Albums by Studt, Orianthi, and Sons of Sylvia were released to minimal success.

In February 2014, 19 Recordings sued Sony Music Entertainment for $10 million in damages, claiming that Sony is robbing them in royalties from digital revenue from streaming platforms such as Spotify, Google, and Apple. As of January 2018, a settlement in principle was reached.

== Current roster ==
- Noah Thompson (with Hollywood Records)
- Laine Hardy (with Hollywood Records)
- Scarypoolparty (with Hollywood Records)
- Laci Kaye Booth (with Nashville Harbor Records & Entertainment)
- Julia Gargano
- Francisco Martin
- Grace Leer
- Dillon James (with Hollywood Records and UMG Nashville)
- Chayce Beckham (with BMG)
- Casey Bishop (with BMG)
- Iam Tongi

== Former artists ==
- Lauren Alaina (with Mercury Nashville)
- Carrie Underwood (with Arista Nashville)
- Fantasia Barrino (with RCA Records)
- Scotty McCreery (with Mercury Nashville)
- Clay Aiken (with RCA)
- Kris Allen (with Jive/RCA)
- David Archuleta (with Jive)
- David Cook (with RCA)
- Daughtry (with RCA Records)
- Kelly Clarkson (with RCA)
- Victoria Beckham
- Bo Bice (with RCA)
- Zoe Birkett (with Universal Music)
- Crystal Bowersox (with Jive)
- Emma Bunton (with Polydor)
- Darius Campbell (with Mercury)
- Diana DeGarmo (with RCA)
- Lee DeWyze (with RCA)
- Colton Dixon (with Sparrow Records)
- Eurythmics (with RCA)
- Nick Fradiani (with Big Machine Records and Republic Records)
- 21st Century Girls
- Gareth Gates (with Universal Music)
- Danny Gokey (with RCA Nashville)
- Tamyra Gray (with RCA)
- Mike Leon Grosch (with Sony BMG)
- Justin Guarini (with RCA)
- Trent Harmon (with Big Machine Records)
- Taylor Hicks (with Arista)
- Allison Iraheta (with Jive)
- Casey James
- Adam Lambert (with RCA)
- Damien Leith (with Sony BMG)
- Annie Lennox (with RCA)
- Blake Lewis (with Arista)
- Laura Marano (with Flip Phone Records)
- Michelle McManus (with BMG)
- Katharine McPhee (with RCA)
- Chris Medina (with Interscope)
- Daniele Negroni (with Universal Music)
- Kurt Nilsen (with RCA)
- Shannon Noll (with Sony Music)
- Orianthi (with Geffen)
- Phillip Phillips (with Interscope Records)
- Kellie Pickler (with BNA)
- Maddie Poppe (with Hollywood Records)
- Tobias Regner (with Sony BMG)
- Haley Reinhart (with Interscope Records)
- La'Porsha Renae (with Motown Records)
- S Club (with Polydor)
- Sam & Mark (with BMG)
- Jessica Sanchez (with Interscope Records)
- Candice Glover (with Interscope Records)
- Juliette Schoppmann (with Ariola Records)
- Guy Sebastian (with Sony Music)
- Jana Škoļina (with Universal Music)
- Sons of Sylvia (with Interscope)
- Jordin Sparks (with Jive)
- Rachel Stevens (with Polydor)
- Ruben Studdard (with J Records)
- Pia Toscano (with Interscope)
- Sarah Whatmore (with RCA)
- Will Young (with RCA)
- Max Creek (with One of 19 Records)

== See also ==
- List of record labels
