= Ich bin ein Star – Holt mich hier raus! season 12 =

Ich bin ein Star – Holt mich hier raus!
- Season 12
- Presented by: Sonja Zietlow; Daniel Hartwich
- No. of days: 16
- No. of contestants: 12
- Winner: Jenny Frankhauser
- Runner-up: Daniele Negroni
- No. of episodes: 16

Release
- Original network: RTL Television
- Original release: 19 January – 3 February 2018

Season chronology
- ← Previous; Season 11 Next → Season 13

The twelfth season of the German-version of the reality show I'm a Celebrity...Get Me Out of Here! began on 19 January 2018 and is scheduled to be broadcast until 3 February 2018 on RTL Television.

Sonja Zietlow and Daniel Hartwich were the hosts as in the years 2013 to 2017. Also the paramedic Bob McCarron alias "Dr. Bob" was back.

== Contestants ==
Place	Contestant	Famous for being ...	Result
1	Jenny Frankhauser	Reality TV personality, half-sister of Daniela Katzenberger	Winner on 4 February 2018
2	Daniele Negroni	Pop Singer, runner-up on Deutschland sucht den Superstar (season 9)	Runner-Up on 4 February 2018
3	Tina York	Schlager singer, sister of Mary Roos	Third place on 4 February 2018
4	David Friedrich	Drummer of Electric Callboy, contestant on Die Bachelorette	Eliminated 7th on 3 February 2018
5	Matthias Mangiapane	Reality TV personality	Eliminated 6th on 2 February 2018
6	Kattia Vides	Reality TV personality, contestant on Der Bachelor	Eliminated 5th on 1 February 2018
7	Natascha Ochsenknecht	Actress, former model	Eliminated 4th on 31 January 2018
8	Tatjana Gsell	Reality TV personality	Eliminated 3rd on 30 January 2018
9	Ansgar Brinkmann	Retired football player	Withdrew on 29 January 2018
10	Sydney Youngblood	Funk singer	Eliminated 2nd on 26 January 2018
11	Sandra Steffl	Actress	Eliminated 1st on 25 January 2018
12	Giuliana Farfalla	Transgender model, contestant on Germany's Next Topmodel (cycle 12)	Withdrew on 24 January 2018

== Results and elimination ==
Indicates that the celebrity received the most votes from the public
Indicates that the celebrity received the fewest votes and was eliminated immediately (no bottom two)
Indicates that the celebrity was in the bottom two of the public vote

Daily results per celebrity
	Day 7	Day 8	Day 9	Day 10	Day 11	Day 12	Day 13	Day 14	Day 15	Day 16 Final	
	Day 7	Day 8	Day 9	Day 10	Day 11	Day 12	Day 13	Day 14	Day 15	Round 1	Round 2
Jenny	2nd 15.39%	1st 23.21%	—N/a	—N/a	2nd 18.30%	1st 27.49%	2nd 22.63%	3rd 17.62%	3rd 25.72%	1st 38.97%	Winner; 53.65%
Daniele	3rd 13.48%	6th 8.77%	—N/a	—N/a	1st 19.92%	2nd 20.49%	3rd 21.76%	1st 40.45%	1st 28.08%	2nd 38.11%	Runner-Up; 46.35%
Tina	7th 6.00%	8th 6.00%	8th	8th	6th 10.11%	4th 13.28%	1st 23.41%	2nd 21.65%	2nd 25.95%	3rd 22.92%	Eliminated (Day 16)
David	5th 11.88%	4th 10.62%	—N/a	—N/a	3rd 14.87%	3rd 14.04%	4th 13.83%	4th 11.53%	4th 20.25%	Eliminated (Day 15)	
Matthias	1st 20.30%	2nd 15.67%	—N/a	—N/a	4th 12.85%	5th 11.06%	5th 11.88%	5th 8.75%	Eliminated (Day 14)		
Kattia	8th 4.68%	5th 9.11%	7th	—N/a	7th 9.99%	6th 7.12%	6th 6.49%	Eliminated (Day 13)			
Natascha	4th 12.36%	3rd 12.56%	—N/a	—N/a	5th 10.90%	7th 6.52%	Eliminated (Day 12)				
Tatjana	10th 2.38%	9th 3.50%	9th	7th	8th 3.06%	Eliminated (Day 11)					
Ansgar	6th 8.72%	7th 7.63%	—N/a	Withdrew (Day 10)							
Sydney	9th 3.02%	10th 2.93%	Eliminated (Day 8)								
Sandra	11th 1.79%	Eliminated (Day 7)									
Giuliana	Withdrew (Day 6)										
Bottom two (named in)	Sandra, Tatjana	Sydney, Tatjana	Tina, Tatjana	Tina, Tatjana	Kattia, Tatjana	Kattia, Natascha	Kattia, Matthias	David, Matthias	David, Jenny	None	
Eliminated	Sandra; 1.79% to save	Sydney; 2.93% to save	None		Tatjana; 3.06% to save	Natascha; 6.52% to save	Kattia; 6.49% to save	Matthias; 8.75% to save	David; 20.25% to save	Tina; 22.92% to win	Daniele; 46.35% to win
Eliminated	Sandra; 1.79% to save	Sydney; 2.93% to save	None		Tatjana; 3.06% to save	Natascha; 6.52% to save	Kattia; 6.49% to save	Matthias; 8.75% to save	David; 20.25% to save	Tina; 22.92% to win	Jenny; 53.65% to win

- On Day 9 and Day 10 none of the celebrities were eliminated because of Giuliana's and Ansgar's exit. On these days the contestant with the fewest votes was announced. The votes were counted for Day 11. After the final the voting stats were not published for these two days.

== Bushtucker Trials ==
Date	Contestant(s)	Trial	Earned rations (stars)
19 January 2018	All Contestants	"Nachsitzen" ("Detention")	(David, Daniele, Sandra/Jenny, Tatjana, Natascha, Ansgar, Matthias, Sydney, Tina, Kattia/Giuliana)
20 January 2018	Jenny Frankhauser; Matthias Mangiapane	"Termiten, kaufen, wohnen" ("Termites, buying, living")	0/12 stars
21 January 2018	Matthias Mangiapane	"Spaßbad Murwillumbah" ("Waterpark Murwillumbah")	(trial refused)
22 January 2018	Matthias Mangiapane	"Das weiße Irrenhaus" ("The white madhouse")	5/12 stars
23 January 2018	Natascha Ochsenknecht; Matthias Mangiapane	"Dschungelkirmes" ("Jungle funfair")	(Ochsenknecht:, Mangiapane:)
24 January 2018	Matthias Mangiapane	"Raumstation Murwillumbah" ("Space Station Murwillumbah")	6/12 stars
25 January 2018	Daniele Negroni; Matthias Mangiapane	"Die ultimative Schad Show" ("The ultimate Mischief Show")	(Negroni:, Mangiapane:, Together:)
26 January 2018	Ansgar Brinkmann; Jenny Frankhauser; Kattia Vides; David Friedrich	"Creek der Sterne" ("Creek of the stars")	*
27 January 2018	Ansgar Brinkmann; Daniele Negroni	"Dschungel-Fabrik" ("Jungle Factory")	5/9 stars
28 January 2018	David Friedrich	"Einmal volltanken, bitte" ("Fill up once, please")	*
29 January 2018	Daniele Negroni; Kattia Vides	"Wenn ich Du wäre, wäre ich lieber ich" ("If I was you, I'd rather be me")	3/8 stars
30 January 2018	Jenny Frankhauser; David Friedrich	"Qualentinstag" ("Torment Valentine's Day")	7/7 stars
31 January 2018	Daniele Negroni; Matthias Mangiapane	"Tunneltrauma" ("Tunnel trauma")	*
1 February 2018	Daniele Negroni	"Spaßbad Murwillumbah 2.0"("Waterpark Murwillumbah 2.0")	5/5 stars
2 February 2018	Jenny Frankhauser; David Friedrich	"Sonderfüll-Deponie"("Hazardous waste landfill")	2/4 stars
3 February 2018	Jenny Frankhauser	"R"; "Rappelkiste"("Rattle Box")	5/5 stars
3 February 2018	Tina York	"T"; "Tierkammer"("Animal Chamber")	5/5 stars
3 February 2018	Daniele Negroni	"L"; "Leibspeise"("Favourite Food")	5/5 stars

- "*": Trials in which only all or no stars could be won

=== Result table: Who Should go to the Bushtucker Trials? ===
Celebrity	Day 1	Day 2	Day 3	Day 4	Day 5	Day 6
Jenny	17.61%	16.32%	7.11%	7.37%	7.48%	6.56%
Daniele	9.66%	7.93%	7.96%	7.97%	12.50%	12.25
Tina	Blocked	Blocked	6.21%	Blocked	Blocked	8.50%
David	6.69%	5.94%	4.81%	5.04%	15.66%	9.46%
Matthias	15.47%	31.32%	48.87%	47.84%	31.91%	30.06%
Kattia	7.99%	5.42%	4.74%	3.81%	6.60%	5.22%
Natascha	9.82%	8.02%	7.70%	8.54%	Blocked	5.16%
Tatjana	11.69%	6.61%	4.92%	6.17%	5.63%	6.32%
Ansgar	7.58%	6.21%	Blocked	5.65%	12.74%	11.52%
Sydney	3.00%	2.83%	2.22%	2.57%	Blocked	2.96%
Sandra	2.09%	1.36%	1.20%	1.33%	1.74%	1.99%
Guiliana	8.40%	8.04%	4.26%	3.71%	5.74%	Withdrew

=== Statistics ===
Celebrity	Trials	Awarded stars	Possible stars	Percentage	Stars
Jenny	6	24	40	60%	24/40 stars
Daniele	7	21	38	55.26%	21/38 stars
Tina	2	6	6	100%	6/6 stars
David	5	20	31	64.51%	20/31 stars
Matthias	8	13	58	22.41%	13/58 stars
Kattia	3	14	20	70%	14/20 stars
Natascha	2	3	7	42.85%	3/7 stars
Tatjana	1	1	1	100%	1/1 star
Ansgar	3	16	20	80.00%	16/20 stars
Sydney	1	1	1	100%	1/1 star
Sandra	1	0	1	0%	0/1 star
Guiliana	1	1	2	50%	1/2 stars

== Ratings ==
Ratings of season 12
Episode	Durating (without advertising)	Date	Viewers Total	Market share Total	Viewers 14 to 49 years	Market share 14 to 49 years	Source
Episodes: "Who Should go to the Bushtucker Trials?"
Episode 1	141 min	19 January 2018	6.49 Mio.	25.0%	3.45 Mio.	39.1%	
Episode 2	81 min	20 January 2018	6.28 Mio.	26.4%	3.53 Mio.	41.5%	
Episode 3	59 min	21 January 2018	5.20 Mio.	20.2%	2.98 Mio.	32.4%	
Episode 4	88 min	22 January 2018	5.14 Mio.	25.5%	2.60 Mio.	37.7%	
Episode 5	100 min	23 January 2018	4.98 Mio.	23.5%	2.74 Mio.	36.3%	
Episode 6	52 min	24 January 2018	5.91 Mio.	25.6%	3.15 Mio.	38.7%	
Episodes: "Who should stay in the camp?"
Episode 7	73 min	25 January 2018	5.36 Mio.	25.0%	3.04 Mio.	41.8%	
Episode 8	85 min	26 January 2018	5.60 Mio.	23.5%	3.22 Mio.	37.9%	
Episode 9	87 min	27 January 2018	5.90 Mio.	25.2%	3.19 Mio.	39.3%	
Episode 10	68 min	28 January 2018	5.33 Mio.	21.8%	2.94 Mio.	33.9%	
Episode 11	91 min	29 January 2018	5.08 Mio.	25.9%	2.68 Mio.	38.7%	
Episode 12	91 min	30 January 2018	4.82 Mio.	24.4%	2.48 Mio.	2.48%	
Episode 13	54 min	31 January 2018	5.21 Mio.	23.5%	2.64 Mio.	36.3%	
Episode 14	67 min	1 February 2018	5.34 Mio.	24.4%	3.00 Mio.	39.2%	
Episode 15	56 min	2 February 2018	5.23 Mio.	19.1%	2.72%	30.1%	
Final
Episode 16	123 min	3 February 2018	6.72 Mio.	29.6%	3.68 Mio.	44.2%	
The big reunion
		4 February 2018	4.39 Mio.	12.4%	2.48 Mio.	20.3%	
