= Ich bin ein Star – Holt mich hier raus! season 10 =

Ich bin ein Star – Holt mich hier raus!
- Season 10
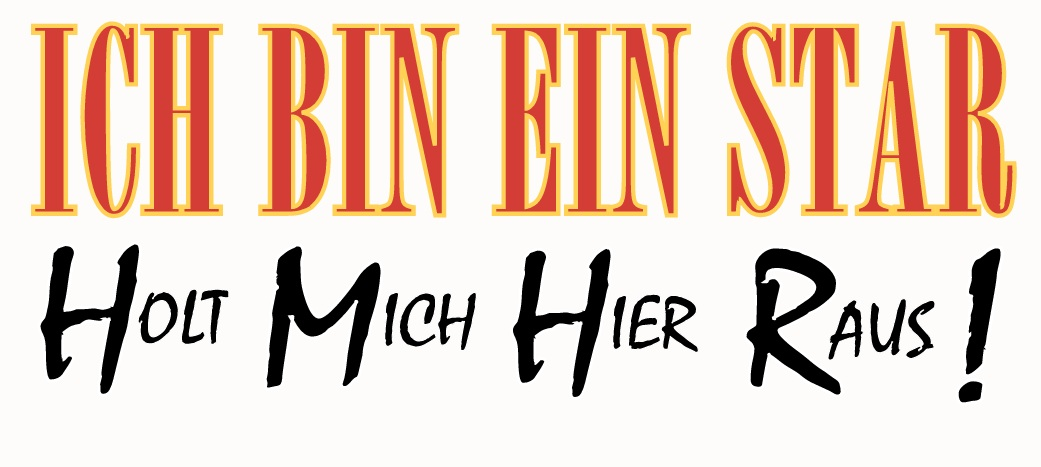
- Presented by: Sonja Zietlow; Daniel Hartwich
- No. of days: 16
- No. of contestants: 12
- Winner: Menderes Bağcı
- Runner-up: Sophia Wollersheim
- No. of episodes: 16

Release
- Original network: RTL Television
- Original release: 15 January – 30 January 2016

Season chronology
- ← Previous; Season 9 Next → Season 11

In the last episode of Season 9 the presenters Zietlow and Hartwich announced that the show would return for a 10th anniversary season in January 2016.

In early August 2015 RTL broadcast a spin-off of the show called "Ich bin ein Star, lasst mich wieder rein" ("I am a celebrity, get me back in"), in which contestants of the nine original seasons competed against each other in order to get a chance to participate in the jubilee season. In total nine episodes and a final were shown, in which three contestants of each season took part. In the final the viewers selected the Queen of the Jungle of the 6th season Brigitte Nielsen to return to the show for the upcoming season. The other contestants were announced in early January 2016.

Some new rules were added to the original procedure. For the first time in the show's history 12 participants were announced to compete. The group of contestants was split into two camps with six participants living in each of the camps. Bushtucker duels took place instead of the original bushtucker trials. The season started off with a special on 15 January. Menderes Bağcı was announced as the winner and King of the Jungle of 30 January 2016.

== Changes ==
Participants were not housed in advance of the season together at the hotel Palazzo Versace, but individually in different ones, simple hostels to avoid arrangements. In the course of the candidate flew independently to Australia, and there were a contactless lock, which prohibits, contact via mobile phone.

Moreover, there were two camps, the Base Camp and the camp Snake Rock in the first three days, which competed in the bushtucker trials every day.

== Contestants ==
For the first time twelve instead of eleven candidates occurred against each other in 2016. Brigitte Nielsen, winner of sixth season in 2012, was for the second time in the jungle camp, after she won the show I'm a Celebrity - Let me in again! in the summer of 2015. Participants moved on 14 January 2016 Australian time to camp.

Place	Contestant	Famous for being...	Left the Jungle
1	Menderes Bağcı	Contestant on Deutschland sucht den Superstar (German version of American Idol) participating in the first stage of all the show's seasons	Winner on 30 January 2016
2	Sophia Wollersheim	Erotic model and wife of the known brothel owner Bert Wollersheim	Runner-Up on 30 January 2016
3	Thorsten Legat	Football coach and former football player for Vfl Bochum and SV Werder Bremen	Third place on 30 January 2016
4	Helena Fürst	Reality TV coach, so called "The poor people's advocate"	Eliminated 7th on 29 January 2016
5	Jürgen Milski	TV presenter, singer, former contestant on Big Brother	Eliminated 6th on 28 January 2016
6	Brigitte Nielsen	Actress and model, German Queen of the Jungle in season 6	Eliminated 5th on 27 January 2016
7	Nathalie Volk	Model, contestant on the season 9 of Germany's Next Topmodel	Eliminated 4th on 26 January 2016
8	Ricky Harris	Former Talk Show host and presenter of Teleshopping	Eliminated 3rd on 24 January 2016
9	Jenny Elvers	Actress, winner of the first season of Promi Big Brother (German version of Celebrity Big Brother)	Eliminated 2nd on 23 January 2016
10	David Ortega	Model and actor (daily soap "Köln 50667"), former contestant on Big Brother	Eliminated 1st on 22 January 2016
11	Rolf Zacher	Actor	Withdrew on 22 January 2016
12	Gunter Gabriel	Singer	Withdrew on 19 January 2016

== Results and elimination ==
Indicates that the celebrity received the most votes from the public
Indicates that the celebrity received the fewest votes and was eliminated immediately (no bottom two)
Indicates that the celebrity was in the bottom two of the public vote

Daily results per celebrity
	Day 8	Day 9	Day 10	Day 11	Day 12	Day 13	Day 14	Day 15	Day 16 Final	
	Day 8	Day 9	Day 10	Day 11	Day 12	Day 13	Day 14	Day 15	Round 1	Round 2
Menderes	2nd 21.33%	2nd 23.88%	1st 23.03%	1st 52.75%	1st 49.51%	1st 56.28%	1st 50.18%	1st 56.45%	1st 74.67%	Winner; 81.11%
Sophia	4th 8.61%	4th 9.04%	3rd 16.04%	3rd 10.72%	2nd 12.33%	5th 6.09%	2nd 16.49%	2nd 24.96%	2nd 17.48%	Runner-Up; 18.89%
Thorsten	3rd 11.26%	1st 28.17%	2nd 19.53%	2nd 11.62%	3rd 11.34%	2nd 16.45%	3rd 13.37%	3rd 11.23%	3rd 7.85%	Eliminated (Day 16)
Helena	1st 23.91%	3rd 11.75%	5th 10.27%	4th 7.41%	5th 7.15%	3rd 10.30%	4th 11.29%	4th 7.36%	Eliminated (Day 15)	
Jürgen	8th 6.11%	7th 5.96%	4th 11.26%	5th 6.43%	6th 6.66%	4th 6.64%	5th 8.67%	Eliminated (Day 14)		
Brigitte	6th 7.83%	5th 6.70%	6th 8.60%	6th 5.61%	4th 7.58%	6th 4.24%	Eliminated (Day 13)			
Nathalie	7th 6.16%	8th 4.27%	7th 6.19%	7th 5.46%	7th 5.43%	Eliminated (Day 12)				
Ricky	5th 8.32%	6th 6.08%	8th 5.08%	Eliminated (Day 10)						
Jenny	9th 3.41%	9th 4.15%	Eliminated (Day 9)							
David	10th 3.06%	Eliminated (Day 8)								
Rolf	Withdrew (Day 8)									
Gunther	Withdrew (Day 5)									
Bottom two (named in)	David, Jenny	Jenny, Nathalie	Nathalie, Ricky	No Elimination	Jürgen, Nathalie	Brigitte, Sophia	Helena, Jürgen	Helena, Thorsten	None	
Eliminated	David; 3.06% to save	Jenny; 4.15% to save	Ricky; 5.08% to save	No Elimination	Nathalie; 5.43% to save	Brigitte; 4.24% to save	Jürgen; 8.67% to save	Helena; 7.36% to save	Thorsten; 7.85% to win	Sophia; 18.89% to win
Eliminated	David; 3.06% to save	Jenny; 4.15% to save	Ricky; 5.08% to save	No Elimination	Nathalie; 5.43% to save	Brigitte; 4.24% to save	Jürgen; 8.67% to save	Helena; 7.36% to save	Thorsten; 7.85% to win	Menderes; 81.11% to win

== The Camps ==
At the beginning of the season saw the first two camps and thus the teams Base Camp and Snake Rock . In the first episode, the candidates were allocated by the producers. The announced change of team assignment during the season has not been performed. While the team phase, the bushtucker trials were carried out as a duel, in which one of each camp fighting for star or food rations. Only the team of the winner got the earned number of rations, the losing team had to make do with rice and beans.

Team Base Camp	Team Snake Rock
Jenny Elvers; Gunter Gabriel; Ricky Harris; Brigitte Nielsen; David Ortega; Sophia Wollersheim	Menderes Bağcı; Helena Fürst; Thorsten Legat; Jürgen Milski; Nathalie Volk; Rolf Zacher

After three days in the Australian jungle, the camps were merged on 18 January. The candidates of the team Snake Rock 'walked' in the well-known Camp, which was already used by the team Base Camp since the beginning of the season.

== Bushtucker Trials & Duels ==
Bushtucker duels
Date	Contestant(s) of the Base Camp	Contestant(s) of the Snake Rock	Duel	Winner und earned rations (stars)	Loser und invalid earned star
15 January 2016	All	All	"Dinner"	Team Snake Rock (Zacher, Volk, Legat, Milski, Fürst, Bağcı)	Team Base Camp (Gabriel, Wollersheim, Elvers, Ortega, Nielsen, Harris)
15 January 2016	Sophia Wollersheim	Menderes Bağcı	"Tierischer Einlauf" ("Animal enema")	Team Snake Rock	Team Base Camp
16 January 2016	Sophia Wollersheim	Helena Fürst	"Die Qual der Zahl" ("The agony of the number")	Team Base Camp	Team Snake Rock
17 January 2016	David Ortega	Helena Fürst	"Die Katakomben der Verzweiflung" ("The Catacombs of Despair")	Team Base Camp	Team Snake Rock
18 January 2016	Jenny Elvers	Helena Fürst	"Das große Kribbeln" ("The big tingling")	Team Base Camp	Team Snake Rock
Bushtucker Trials
Date	Contestant(s)	Trial		Earned rations (stars)	
19 January 2016	Helena Fürst; Thorsten Legat	"Das defekte Promi-Dinner" ("The Broken Celebrity Dinner")		(Fürst, Legat)	
20 January 2016	Helena Fürst	"Dschungellabor" ("Jungle laboratory")		(Refused)	
21 January 2016	Helena Fürst; David Ortega (as Joker)	"Das Dschungeltalent" ("The Jungle talent")		(Fürst, Ortega)	
22 January 2016	Helena Fürst; Ricky Harris (as an assistant)	"Dschungelspielplatz" ("Jungle playground")		(Trial aborted by Helena)	
23 January 2016	Thorsten Legat	"Höhlenqualen" (""Caves torments")		9/9 stars	
24 January 2016	Jürgen Milski; Ricky Harris(as an assistant)	"Altventskalender" ("Old Advent calendar")		8/8 stars	
25 January 2016	Menderes Bağcı; Nathalie Volk	"Lotterie des Grauens" ("Lottery of horror")		4/7 stars	
26 January 2016	Sophia Wollersheim; Brigitte Nielsen	"Dschungel-Metzgerei" ("Jungle butcher")		0/7 stars	
27 January 2016	Menderes Bağcı	"Dschungellabor Teil 2" ("Jungle laboratory 2")		6/6 stars	
28 January 2016	Menderes Bagči; Thorsten Legat; Jürgen Milski	"Der Große Preis von Murwillumbah" ("The Grand Prix of Murwillumbah")		0/5 stars	
29 January 2016	Helena Fürst; Sophia Wollersheim	"Auf Floß geht's los" ("On the raft we go")		(Trial aborted by Helena)	
30 January 2016	Thorsten	Appetizer: Kasalla		5/5 stars	
30 January 2016	Sophia	Main Dish: Hallöchen Popöchen		4/5 stars	
30 January 2016	Menderes	Dessert: C'Mon		5/5 stars	

=== Statistics ===
Celebrity	Trials	Awarded stars	Possible stars	Percentage	Stars
Menderes	6	22	30	73.3%	22/30 stars
Sophia	6	11	24	45.8%	11/24 stars
Thorsten	5	21	26	80.8%	21/26 stars
Helena	9	19	59	32.2%	19/59 stars
Jürgen	3	8	14	57.1%	8/14 stars
Brigitte	2	0	8	0%	0/8 stars
Nathalie	2	5	8	62.5%	5/8 stars
Ricky	3	9	20	45%	9/20 stars
Jenny	2	4	7	57.1%	4/7 stars
David	3	9	10	90%	9/10 stars
Rolf	1	1	1	100%	1/1 star
Gunther	1	1	1	100%	1/1 star

== Ratings ==
Ratings of season ten
Episode	Dauer (without advertising)	Date	Viewers Total	Market share Total	Viewers 14 to 49 years	Market share 14 to 49 years	Source
Episodes: "Who Should go to the Bushtucker Trials/Duels?"
Episode 1	144 Min.	15 January 2016	7,68 Mio.	28,0 %	4,39 Mio.	42,3 %	
Episode 2	63 Min.	16 January 2016	7,96 Mio.	28,7 %	4,72 Mio.	41,3 %	
Episode 3	64 Min.	17 January 2016	6,14 Mio.	24,4 %	3,61 Mio.	35,0 %	
Episode 4	89 Min.	18 January 2016	6,85 Mio.	31,0 %	3,91 Mio.	43,9 %	
Episode 5	90 Min.	19 January 2016	6,15 Mio.	30,1 %	3,49 Mio.	43,0 %	
Episode 6	49 Min.	20 January 2016	6,89 Mio.	28,6 %	3,94 Mio.	41,9 %	
Episode 7	59 Min.	21 January 2016	6,25 Mio.	26,6 %	3,55 Mio.	38,4 %	
Episodes: "Who should stay in the camp?"
Episode 8	90 Min.	22 January 2016	7,12 Mio.	27,5 %	4,04 Mio.	39,3 %	
Episode 9	85 Min.	23 January 2016	7,13 Mio.	27,6 %	4,07 Mio.	40,1 %	
Episode 10	60 Min.	24 January 2016	6,12 Mio.	23,6 %	3,49 Mio.	33,3 %	
Episode 11	56 Min.	25 January 2016	7,22 Mio.	29,0 %	3,95 Mio.	39,9 %	
Episode 12	91 Min.	26 January 2016	6,19 Mio.	30,1 %	3,42 Mio.	43,5 %	
Episode 13	50 Min.	27 January 2016	7,32 Mio.	30,2 %	4,20 Mio.	43,5 %	
Episode 14	64 Min.	28 January 2016	6,85 Mio.	28,8 %	3,82 Mio.	41,2 %	
Episode 15	61 Min.	29 January 2016	7,13 Mio.	25,2 %	3,93 Mio.	36,4 %	
Final
Episode 16	107 Min.	30 January 2016	8.60 Mio.	34.2%	4.88%	47.8%	
The big reunion
—	100 Min.	31 January 2016	5.40 Mio.	14.4%	3.06%	20.5%	
