= Frl. Menke =

German singer (born 1960)

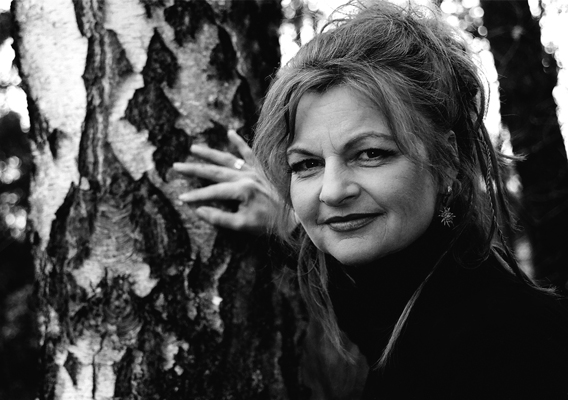
- Frl. Menke in 2008

Background information
- Born: 4 November 1960 (age 64); Hamburg, West Germany
- Genres: Neue Deutsche Welle
- Occupation: Singer
- Years active: 1982–present
- Labels: Polydor Records
- Website: frlmenke.de

Franziska Menke (born 4 November 1960), known professionally as Frl. Menke, (Note: Frl. is an abbreviation of Fräulein (English: Miss)) is a German singer. She was a star of the Neue Deutsche Welle genre of German popular music in the early 1980s. Menke is best known for her single "Hohe Berge" ("High Mountains"), which was a top 10 hit in the German charts in 1982 and has sold more than 2.5 million copies to date.

== Career ==
Menke is the daughter of the German songwriter, producer and publisher Joe Menke. Her debut single "Hohe Berge" became an instant success in 1982 and was one of the first songs of the Neue Deutsche Welle (NDW) popular music movement that became hugely popular in Germany in the early 1980s. Menke was one of very few female artists to succeed in the genre.

Menke's career peaked from 1982–1984 along with Neue Deutsche Welle, when she had three hit singles and released a self-titled album. She sold more than three million records during 1982 and 1983.

Menke gave birth to two children at the end of the 1980s and composed various jingles for radio stations and advertisement campaigns. In 1992, she released her second album, Ich Will's Gefährlich, with limited success.

She has rerecorded or remixed her most successful singles. In 1990, she was remixed by the German band Masterboy, and in 1994, she recorded techno versions of "Hohe Berge" and "Tretboot in Seenot." She performed another version of "Hohe Berge" for her 2005 album Einwandfrei and recorded an industrial version with German band the Seven Seals in 2007.

== Trivia ==
- Menke still tours Germany, often with other bands and singers from the Neue Deutsche Welle era.
- Frl. is the abbreviation for Fräulein, which is the German equivalent for "Miss." However, the term is rarely used in present-day Germany.
- Menke was voted one of the 10 most popular singers in 1982 by German teen magazine Bravo.
- Menke has starred in several musicals in Hamburg, Germany since 2001.
- Her debut album was rereleased on CD for the first time in 1999, containing several extended versions, B-sides of her original singles and two previously unreleased songs ("Du Tarzan, Ich Jane" and "Schuljungenreport").
- In 2017, she participated in German TV show Ich bin ein Star – Holt mich hier raus!.

== Discography ==
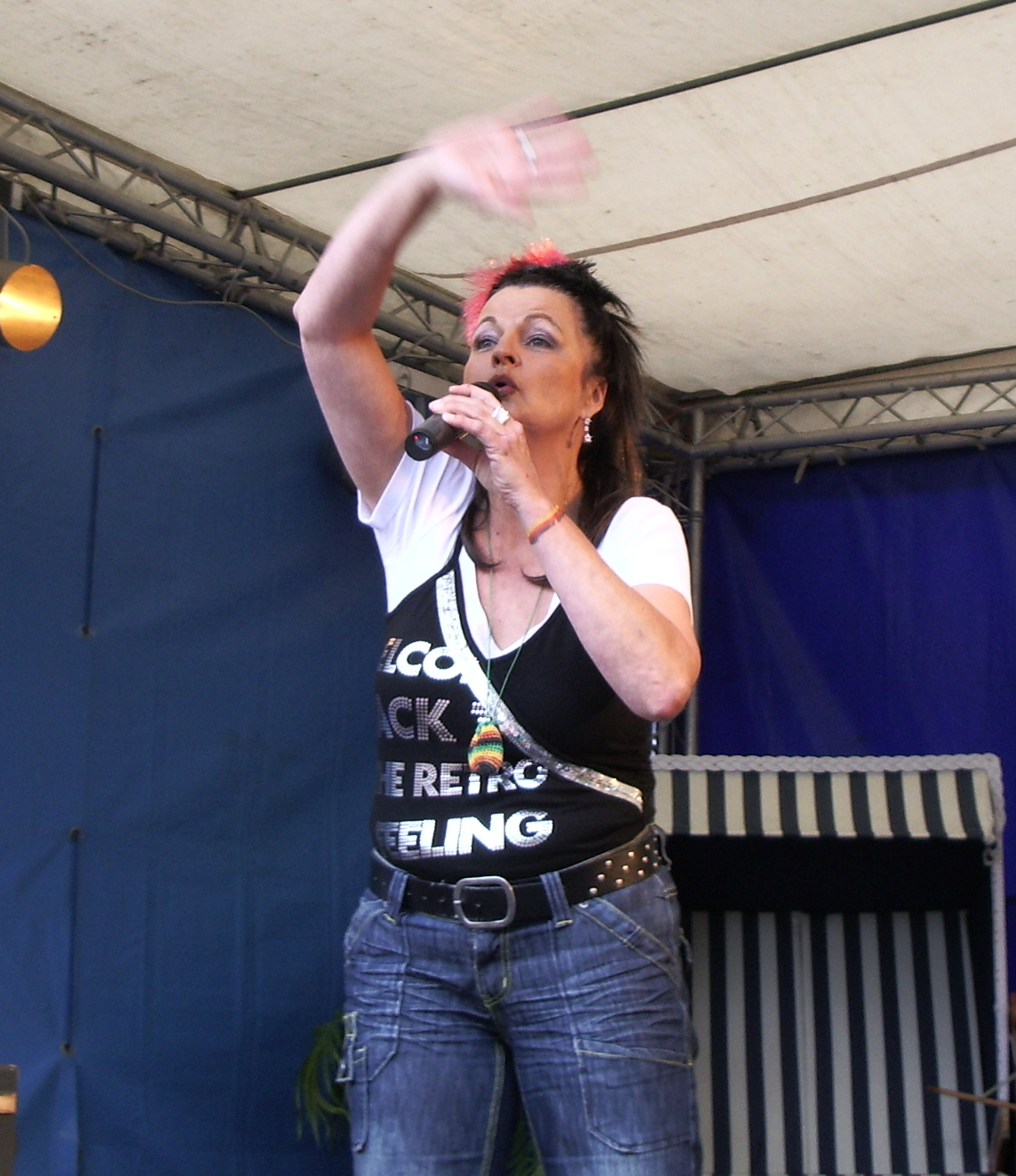
Frl. Menke performing in 2008

=== Albums ===
- 1982 Frl. Menke
- 1992 Ich will's gefährlich [as Franziska Menke]
- 2005 Einwandfrei

=== Singles ===
- 1980 "Wie Du bist" [as Franziska Menke]
- 1982 "Hohe Berge"
- 1982 "Traumboy"
- 1983 "Tretboot in Seenot"
- 1983 "Messeglück in Düsseldorf"
- 1984 "Die Ganze Nacht" [as Franziska Menke]
- 1990 "Hohe Berge – Remix"
- 1992 "Ich will's gefährlich" [as Franziska Menke]
- 1992 "Ich hol doch keine Brötchen" [as Franziska Menke]
- 1992 "Himmel" [as Franziska Menke]
- 1993 "Frau neben mir"
- 2010 "Freunde"

== Chart information ==
- Hohe Berge: No. 10 German single charts
- Traumboy: No. 39 German single charts
- Tretboot in Seenot: No. 24 German single charts
