= Jana Škoļina =

Latvian singer-songwriter

- Born: 2 November 1990 (age 35); Ludza, Latvia
- Genres: Pop
- Occupation: Singer-songwriter
- Instrument: Vocals
- Years active: 2006–present
- Label: 19 Recordings

Jana Škoļina (born 2 November 1990) is a Latvian singer-songwriter who has appeared on the TV programs Latvijas Talants and season 9 of Deutschland sucht den Superstar.

== Biography ==
=== Early life ===
Škoļina was born in Ludza, Latvia. She began playing violin and piano at age six, and attended music school in Ludza. Škoļina then moved to Riga, where she continued to study music at the Jazepa Medina Rigas Muzikas Vidusskola.

In 2006 she auditioned for the second season of the Latvian show Latvijas Talants, advanced to the final and finished second in the superfinal. Škoļina moved to London to attend The Institute of Contemporary Music Performance, studying vocal and stage performance.

=== Deutschland sucht den Superstar ===
During her first appearance on Deutschland sucht den Superstar, Škoļina (one of 35,401 candidates to audition for the season) sang two songs: "Hallelujah" accompanying herself on the piano and "A Night Like This". The jury allowed her to advance.

In the recall, Škoļina performed with three other candidates: Mercia Okemba, Alexandra Pauna and Anna Zafarian, singing Alexandra Stan's "Mr. Saxobeat". Out of 120 candidates, she was one of 31 to advance to the next recall in the Maldives. There, Škoļina performed several songs (including "Pata Pata", originally recorded by Miriam Makeba) with Isabelle Kessel and Liza-Marie Viebrock. The head of the jury (songwriter, TV personality and lead singer of Modern Talking Dieter Bohlen) said, "Today I see smaller breasts, but hear a bigger voice".

One of Škoļina's performance was a duet with Marcel Porfumo of "You're Beautiful", co-written and recorded by James Blunt. The jury again noted her singing as well as her looks, and it was considered among her best performances. After this performance, it was rumored that Škoļina and Porfumo had had an affair after a rumored flirtation between her and Luca Hänni in the Maldives.

For her last Maldives performance Škoļina chose the Lady Gaga song "You and I", and was one of 15 candidates chosen to perform before a live TV audience. On the live show, telecast by RTL Television, Škoļina performed Katy Perry's "The One That Got Away". With 3.21 percent of the vote, she placed 12th of the 15 finalists.

==== Performances ====
Show (Original air date)	Song (artist)
Casting (25 January 2012)	"Hallelujah" (Jeff Buckley)
Casting (25 January 2012)	"A Night Like This" (Caro Emerald)
Recall (1 February 2012)	"Mr. Saxobeat" (Alexandra Stan)
Maldives (8 February 2012)	"Pata Pata" (Miriam Makeba)
Maldives (15 February 2012)	"You're Beautiful" (James Blunt)
Maldives (21 February 2012)	"You and I" (Lady Gaga)
Live Show (26 February 2012)	"The One That Got Away" (Katy Perry)

== Singles ==
Title	Year
"Every Minute of My Life"	2012
