= Ich bin ein Star – Holt mich hier raus! season 11 =

Ich bin ein Star – Holt mich hier raus!
- Season 11
- Presented by: Sonja Zietlow; Daniel Hartwich
- No. of days: 16
- No. of contestants: 12
- Winner: Marc Terenzi
- Runner-up: Hanka Rackwitz
- No. of episodes: 16

Release
- Original network: RTL Television
- Original release: 13 January – 28 January 2017

Season chronology
- ← Previous; Season 10 Next → Season 12

The eleventh season of the German-version of the reality show I'm a Celebrity...Get Me Out of Here! began on 12 January 2017. In the last episode of Season 10 the presenters Zietlow and Hartwich announced that the show would return for an 11th season in January 2017. The contestants were announced in early January 2017. 12 participants were announced to compete. The group of contestants was split into two camps with six participants living in each of the camps. Bushtucker duels took place instead of the original bushtucker trials. The season started off with a special on 13 January.

== Contestants ==
Twelve contestants take part in this season. Before the season started, Nastassja Kinski withdrew from the show and was replaced by Kader Loth. Participants moved on 12 January 2017 Australian time to camp. This was the first season to have no voluntary exit by a contestant.

| Place | Contestant | Famous for being... | Left the Jungle |
|---|---|---|---|
| 1 | Marc Terenzi | Pop singer | Winner on 28 January 2017 |
| 2 | Hanka Rackwitz | contestant on Big Brother, docu soap actress | Runner-Up on 28 January 2017 |
| 3 | Florian Wess | model, Reality TV star, contestant on Big Brother | Third place on 28 January 2017 |
| 4 | Thomas Häßler | Former footballer | Eliminated 9th on 27 January 2017 |
| 5 | Kader Loth | mannequin, contestant on Big Brother | Eliminated 8th on 26 January 2017 |
| 6 | Jens Büchner | Expatriate in the docu soap "Goodbye Deutschland!" | Eliminated 7th on 25 January 2017 |
| 7 | Alexander "Honey" Keen | model, ex-boyfriend of Germany's Next Topmodel winner Kim Hnizdo | Eliminated 6th on 24 January 2017 |
| 8 | Gina-Lisa Lohfink | model, contestant on Germany's Next Topmodel | Eliminated 5th on 23 January 2017 |
| 9 | Nicole Mieth | Soap actress | Eliminated 4th on 22 January 2017 |
| 10 | Markus Majowski | Actor, comedian | Eliminated 3rd on 21 January 2017 |
| 11 | Sarah Joelle Jahnel | contestant on Deutschland sucht den Superstar | Eliminated 2nd on 20 January 2017 |
| 12 | Frl. Menke | 80's pop singer | Eliminated 1st on 19 January 2017 |

== Results and elimination ==
Indicates that the celebrity received the most votes from the public
Indicates that the celebrity received the fewest votes and was eliminated immediately (no bottom two)
Indicates that the celebrity was in the bottom two of the public vote

Daily results per celebrity
| | Day 7 | Day 8 | Day 9 | Day 10 | Day 11 | Day 12 | Day 13 | Day 14 | Day 15 | Day 16 Final | |
| | Day 7 | Day 8 | Day 9 | Day 10 | Day 11 | Day 12 | Day 13 | Day 14 | Day 15 | Round 1 | Round 2 |
|---|---|---|---|---|---|---|---|---|---|---|---|
| Marc | 2nd 11.26% | 2nd 14.04% | 1st 27.59% | 1st 24.56% | 1st 33.47% | 1st 32.89% | 1st 32.93% | 1st 38.81% | 1st 60.05% | 1st 59.31% | Winner; 74.30% |
| Hanka | 1st 24.03% | 1st 19.78% | 2nd 17.70% | 2nd 17.96% | 2nd 18.86% | 2nd 23.33% | 2nd 20.44% | 2nd 19.00% | 3rd 13.63% | 2nd 21.14% | Runner-Up; 25.70% |
| Florian | 4th 8.81% | 3rd 13.73% | 5th 7.72% | 3rd 15.57% | 3rd 10.99% | 3rd 13.45% | 3rd 16.55% | 3rd 17.79% | 2nd 14.08% | 3rd 19.55% | Eliminated (Day 16) |
| Thomas | 5th 8.80% | 5th 8.24% | 7th 6.58% | 8th 6.00% | 5th 7.98% | 6th 7.17% | 5th 10.15% | 4th 14.66% | 4th 12.24% | Eliminated (Day 15) | |
| Kader | 6th 8.75% | 9th 5.92% | 4th 9.16% | 5th 7.53% | 6th 6.94% | 4th 9.22% | 4th 11.68% | 5th 9.74% | Eliminated (Day 14) | | |
| Jens | 3rd 8.91% | 6th 8.17% | 3rd 9.18% | 6th 6.79% | 7th 6.24% | 5th 7.85% | 6th 8.25% | Eliminated (Day 13) | | | |
| Honey | 10th 4.18% | 10th 4.86% | 9th 4.84% | 4th 9.61% | 4th 9.71% | 7th 6.09% | Eliminated (Day 12) | | | | |
| Gina-Lisa | 7th 8.50% | 4th 9.52% | 6th 7.11% | 7th 6.47% | 8th 5.81% | Eliminated (Day 11) | | | | | |
| Nicole | 8th 6.19% | 8th 6.03% | 8th 6.41% | 9th 5.51% | Eliminated (Day 10) | | | | | | |
| Markus | 11th 3.51% | 7th 6.36% | 10th 3.71% | Eliminated (Day 9) | | | | | | | |
| Sarah Joelle | 9th 4.32% | 11th 3.35% | Eliminated (Day 8) | | | | | | | | |
| Frl. Menke | 12th 2.74% | Eliminated (Day 7) | | | | | | | | | |
| Bottom two (named in) | Frl. Menke, Markus | Honey, Sarah Joelle | Honey, Markus | Nicole, Thomas | Gina-Lisa, Jens | Honey, Thomas | Jens, Thomas | Kader, Thomas | Hanka, Thomas | None | |
| Eliminated | Frl. Menke; 2.74% to save | Sarah Joelle; 3.35% to save | Markus; 3.71% to save | Nicole; 5.51% to save | Gina-Lisa; 5.81% to save | Honey; 6.09% to save | Jens; 8.25% to save | Kader; 9.74% to save | Thomas; 12.24% to save | Florian; 19.55% to win | Hanka; 25.70% to win |
| Eliminated | Frl. Menke; 2.74% to save | Sarah Joelle; 3.35% to save | Markus; 3.71% to save | Nicole; 5.51% to save | Gina-Lisa; 5.81% to save | Honey; 6.09% to save | Jens; 8.25% to save | Kader; 9.74% to save | Thomas; 12.24% to save | Florian; 19.55% to win | Marc; 74.30% to win |

== The Camps ==
At the beginning of the season saw the first two camps and thus the teams Base Camp and Snake Rock . In the first episode, Honey for Base Camp and Hanka for Snake Rock selected their team alternately. While the team phase, the bushtucker trials were carried out as a duel, in which one of each camp fighting for star or food rations. Only the team of the winner got the earned number of rations, the losing team had to make do with rice and beans.

| Team Base Camp | Team Snake Rock |
|---|---|
| Gina-Lisa Lohfink; Honey; Marc Terenzi; Markus Majowski; Nicole Mieth; Sarah Joelle Jahnel | Florian Wess; Frl. Menke; Hanka Rackwitz; Jens Büchner; Kader Loth; Thomas Häßler |

After four days in the Australian jungle, the camps were merged on 16 January. The candidates of the team Snake Rock 'walked' in the well-known Camp, which was already used by the team Base Camp since the beginning of the season.

== Bushtucker Trials & Duels ==
Bushtucker duels
| Date | Contestant(s) of the Base Camp | Contestant(s) of the Snake Rock | Duel | Winner und earned rations (stars) | Loser und invalid earned star |
|---|---|---|---|---|---|
| 12 January 2017 | All | All | "Jungle Arena" | Team Snake Rock (Büchner, Frl. Menke, Wess, Rackwitz, Loth, Häßler) | Team Base Camp ("Honey", Terenzi, Lohfink, Majowski, Jahnel, Mieth) |
| 13 January 2017 | Markus Majowski | Frl. Menke | "Oll you can eat" | Team Base Camp | Team Snake Rock (forfeited challenge) |
| 14 January 2017 | Alexander "Honey" Keen | Florian Wess | "Das Schlimmbad" ("The evil bath") | Team Base Camp | Team Snake Rock |
| 15 January 2017 | Gina-Lisa Lohfink; Alexander "Honey" Keen | Hanka Rackwitz; Kader Loth | "Getier für vier" ("Animals for four") | Team Base Camp | Team Snake Rock |
| 16 January 2017 | Sarah Joelle Jahnel (assisted by Marc Terenzi & Markus Majowski) | Kader Loth (assisted by Florian Wess & Jens Büchner) | "Der große Preis von Murwillumbah" ("Murwillumbah Grand Prix") | Team Base Camp | Team Snake Rock |
Bushtucker Trials
| Date | Contestant(s) | Trial | | Earned rations (stars) | |
| 17 January 2017 | Kader Loth | "Down Under" | | 9/12 stars | |
| 18 January 2017 | Hanka Rackwitz; Nicole Mieth | "Die Zwickmühle" (" Pinching windmill") | | 12/12 stars | |
| 19 January 2017 | Sarah Joelle Jahnel | "Dschungelschlachthof" ("Jungle Slaughterhouse") | | 7/12 stars | |
| 20 January 2017 | Alexander „Honey“ Keen; Marc Terenzi; Markus Majowski; Florian Wess; Thomas Häßler | „Ruck Schluck“ | | 3/11 stars | |
| 21 January 2017 | Marc Terenzi; Jens Büchner | „Sternenfänger“ ("Star catchers") | | 2/10 stars | |
| 22 January 2017 | All | „Museum of Murwillumbah" | | (Trial aborted by Honey) | |
| 23 January 2017 | Alexander „Honey“ Keen; Marc Terenzi | "Unter Strom" ("Under electricity") | | 5/8 stars | |
| 24 January 2017 | Hanka Rackwitz; Marc Terenzi | "Dschungel-Casino" ("Jungle casino") | | 1/7 stars | |
| 25 January 2017 | All | „Museum of Murwillumbah - Part 2" | | 0/6 stars | |
| 26 January 2017 | Thomas Häßler; Florian Wess | „Zwei Paddel für ein Krabbelujah“ ("Two paddles for a crawling-lujah") | | 1/5 stars | |
| 27 January 2017 | Marc Terenzi | "Kanalverkehr" ("Canal traffic") | | 4/4 stars | |
| 28 January 2017 | Hanka Rackwitz | Appetizer: "Uff!" | | 5/5 stars | |
| 28 January 2017 | Marc Terenzi | Main dish: "Ächz!" | | 2/5 stars | |
| 28 January 2017 | Florian Wess | Dessert: "Doing!" | | 5/5 stars | |

=== Statistics ===
| Celebrity | Trials | Awarded stars | Possible stars | Percentage | Stars |
|---|---|---|---|---|---|
| Marc | 9 | 22 | 55 | 40% | 22/55 stars |
| Hanka | 7 | 23 | 43 | 76.7% | 23/43 stars |
| Florian | 8 | 15 | 36 | 41.6% | 15/36 stars |
| Thomas | 5 | 4 | 15 | 26.6% | 4/15 stars |
| Kader | 6 | 13 | 27 | 48.1% | 13/27 stars |
| Jens | 5 | 3 | 19 | 15.7% | 3/19 stars |
| Honey | 6 | 20 | 33 | 60.6% | 20/33 stars |
| Gina | 3 | 6 | 8 | 75% | 6/8 stars |
| Nicole | 3 | 12 | 14 | 85.7% | 12/14 stars |
| Markus | 4 | 11 | 24 | 45.8% | 11/24 stars |
| Sarah | 3 | 11 | 19 | 57.9% | 11/19 stars |
| Frl. Menke | 2 | 0 | 7 | 0.0% | 0/7 stars |

== Ratings ==
Ratings of season eleven
| Episode | Length | | Date | Viewers Total | Market share Total | Viewers 14 to 49 years | Market share 14 to 49 years | Source |
| Episode | (with ad | (without ad) | Date | Viewers Total | Market share Total | Viewers 14 to 49 years | Market share 14 to 49 years | Source |
|---|---|---|---|---|---|---|---|---|
Episodes: "Who Should go to the Bushtucker Trials/Duels?"
| Episode 1 | 175 Min. | 142 Min. | 13. January 2017 | 7,36 Mio. | 26,8 % | 4,20 Mio. | 41,8 % | |
| Episode 2 | 105 Min. | 80 Min. | 14. January 2017 | 7,26 Mio. | 28,6 % | 4,30 Mio. | 44,0 % | |
| Episode 3 | 82 Min. | 67 Min. | 15. January 2017 | 6,29 Mio. | 25,1 % | 3,59 Mio. | 38,0 % | |
| Episode 4 | 112 Min. | 89 Min. | 16. January 2017 | 6,34 Mio. | 30,3 % | 3,48 Mio. | 43,3 % | |
| Episode 5 | 112 Min. | 88 Min. | 17. January 2017 | 5,75 Mio. | 28,6 % | 3,08 Mio. | 41,6 % | |
| Episode 6 | 66 Min. | 50 Min. | 18. January 2017 | 6,60 Mio. | 28,5 % | 3,59 Mio. | 44,0 % | |
Episodes: "Who should stay in the camp?"
| Episode 7 | 76 Min. | 59 Min. | 19. January 2017 | 6,14 Mio. | 27,4 % | 3,44 Mio. | 42,9 % | |
| Episode 8 | 111 Min. | 90 Min. | 20. January 2017 | 6,48 Mio. | 26,9 % | 3,49 Mio. | 38,4 % | |
| Episode 9 | 110 Min. | 88 Min. | 21. January 2017 | 6,62 Mio. | 26,4 % | 3,55 Mio. | 38,6 % | |
| Episode 10 | 83 Min. | 65 Min. | 22. January 2017 | 6,09 Mio. | 24,6 % | 3,22 Mio. | 34,0 % | |
| Episode 11 | 80 Min. | 65 Min. | 23. January 2017 | 6,57 Mio. | 29,0 % | 3,43 Mio. | 40,9 % | |
| Episode 12 | 114 Min. | 91 Min. | 24. January 2017 | 6,12 Mio. | 29,5 % | 3,23 Mio. | 43,0 % | |
| Episode 13 | 67 Min. | 52 Min. | 25. January 2017 | 6,49 Mio. | 27,4 % | 3,55 Mio. | 41,9 % | |
| Episode 14 | 87 Min. | 70 Min. | 26. January 2017 | 5,92 Mio. | 26,6 % | 3,24 Mio. | 39,8 % | |
| Episode 15 | 70 Min. | 56 Min. | 27. January 2017 | 6,60 Mio. | 24,7 % | 3,54 Mio. | 36,5 % | |
Final
| Episode 16 | | | 28. January 2017 | | | | | |
The big reunion
| — | | | 29. January 2017 | | | | | |
The sequel
| — | | | 11. February 2017 | | | | | |
