= 21st Century Girls =

British band

- Also known as: She Devil
- Origin: Dudley, England, UK
- Years active: 1996–2000
- Labels: 19 Recordings
- Past members: Leanne Garner; Fiona Garner; Kate Turley; Meriam "Mim" Mohammad; Charlotte Fendek

21st Century Girls were a teenage all-female band founded in 1996 in Dudley, West Midlands, UK. Previously called Girl Power and She Devil, the band originally consisted of singer Leanne Garner, her sister Fiona Garner on bass, guitarists Kate Turley and Meriam "Mim" Mohammad, and drummer Charlotte Fendek. Fendek later left the band, and Mohammad moved onto drums. In 1999, the band (then aged 14–16 years) were the first signing to Simon Fuller's 19 Recordings. After a big publicity campaign the band released their debut single, "21st Century Girls", in June 1999. The single reached number 16 on the UK Singles Chart.

The band disbanded after they were dropped by their record company in 2000.

Kate Turley went on to form the band The Fight.

== Discography ==
=== Album ===
- 21st Century Girls (19 Recordings/EMI) (1999) [Japan only release]

=== Singles ===
- "21st Century Girls" / "If You're Mad Enough" (19 Recordings/EMI) (1999) (UK #16)
- "Teenage Attack" / "Cats & Dogs" (19 Recordings/EMI) (1999) [Japan only release]

=== Compilation appearances ===
- Music From The Motion Picture Anywhere But Here (Atlantic) (1999) – "Scream And Shout"
- Now That's What I Call Music! 10 (EMI) (1999) – "21st Century Girls"
- EMI Summer '99 (Shit Va' Hits!) 3XCD (EMI/Chrysalis) (1999) – "21st Century Girls"
- EMI Summer 1999 (EMI/Chrysalis) (1999) – "Teenage Attack"

== Final line-up ==
- Leanne Garner – Lead Vocals
- Fiona Garner – Bass / Vocals
- Kate Turley – Guitar / Vocals
- Meriam "Mim" Mohammad – Drums (previously Guitar) / Vocals

== Previous member ==
- Charlotte Fendek – Drums
