= Kristof Hering =

German singer (born 1989)

Kristof Hering (born 27 February 1989) is a German singer, best known for finishing in sixth place in season 9 of Deutschland sucht den Superstar.

== Early life ==
Hering was born in Hanover, West Germany. He has an older sister and younger brother. In 2008, he left home and went to a Catholic Gymnasium where he received his Abitur. He was at the Stage-School-Hamburg in 2008 and 2009.

He is a fan of Udo Jürgens, Robbie Williams and Peter Maffay. He also likes jazz and pop. His favorite songs includes "Über 7 Brücken" by Peter Maffay and "I sing a Liad für di" by Andreas Gabalier.

== Career ==
=== DSDS ===
Hering was eliminated in the top 6 of Deutschland sucht den Superstar. He suffered verbal abuse and death threats during his participation during season 9 due to his homosexuality. People were writing stuff like "You are sooo gay to .."; "I'll cut your balls"; "Get out of DSDS, if you value your life" and "I stab you up". Broadcaster RTL filed charges against unknown persons because of the threats.

==== Performances ====
Show (Original airdate)	Song (artist)	Percentage of calls
Top 16 (25 February 2012)	"Und es war Sommer" (Peter Maffay)	
Top 10 (3 March 2012)	"Verdammt ich lieb dich" (Matthias Reim)	
Top 9 (10 March 2012)	"Ai se eu te pego!" (Michel Teló)	
Top 8 (17 March 2012)	"So bist du" (Peter Maffay)	
Top 7 (24 March 2012)	"Über den Wolken" (Dieter Thomas Kuhn)	
Top 6 (31 March 2012)	"Joana" (Roland Kaiser)	
Top 6 (31 March 2012)	"Y.M.C.A" (Village People) (duet with Daniele Negroni)	

=== Post-DSDS ===
After DSDS, Hering released a single called "Tears of Happiness".
