= Ich bin ein Star – Holt mich hier raus! season 9 =

Ich bin ein Star – Holt mich hier raus!
- Season 9
- Presented by: Sonja Zietlow; Daniel Hartwich
- No. of days: 17
- No. of contestants: 11
- Winner: Maren Gilzer
- Runner-up: Jörn Schlönvoigt
- No. of episodes: 16

Release
- Original network: RTL Television
- Original release: 16 January – 28 January 2015

Season chronology
- ← Previous; Season 8 Next → Season 10

In the last episode of season 8, Zietlow and Hartwich confirmed that the show will return for its 9th season in 2015. The contestants were announced in early January 2015. The season started off with a special on 16 January. While the first five contestants moved into the camp on 15 January, the six other campers stayed in a pre-camp on an island for a night and joined the other contestants on 16 January.

== Contestants ==
Place	Contestant	Famous for being...	Entered the Jungle	Left the Jungle	Picture
1	Maren Gilzer	Former assistant on the German edition of Wheel of Fortune	15 January	1 February (won with 56.18%)	
2	Jörn Schlönvoigt	Singer and actor (Gute Zeiten, schlechte Zeiten)	15 January	1 February (eliminated with 43.82%)	
3	Tanja Tischewitsch	Contestant on Deutschland sucht den Superstar	15 January	1 February (eliminated with 21.59%)	
4	Rolf Scheider	Former jury member on Germany's Next Topmodel and Austria's Next Topmodel	16 January	31 January (eliminated with 9.65%)	
5	Aurelio Savina	Contestant on Die Bachelorette	16 January	30 January (eliminated with 6.40%)	
6	Walter Freiwald	TV host, presenter of Der Preis ist heiß and Teleshopping	16 January	29 January (eliminated with 8.30%)	
7	Rebecca Siemoneit-Barum	Actress (Lindenstraße) and former circus artist	15 January	28 January (eliminated with 7.18%)	
8	Sara Kulka	Model and contestant on Germany's Next Topmodel	15 January	26 January (eliminated with 7.37%)	
9	Benjamin Boyce	Member of disbanded boygroup Caught in the Act	15 January	25 January (eliminated with 5.33%)	
10	Patricia Blanco	Daughter of singer Roberto Blanco	16 January	24 January (eliminated with 4.32%)	
11	Angelina Heger	Contestant on Der Bachelor	16 January	23 January (voluntarily)	

== Results and elimination ==
Indicates that the celebrity received the most votes from the public
Indicates that the celebrity received the fewest votes and was eliminated immediately (no bottom two)
Indicates that the celebrity was in the bottom two of the public vote

Daily results per celebrity
	Day 8	Day 9	Day 10	Day 11	Day 12	Day 13	Day 14	Day 15	Day 16 Final	
	Day 8	Day 9	Day 10	Day 11	Day 12	Day 13	Day 14	Day 15	Round 1	Round 2
Maren	3rd 15.47%	1st 21.10%	2nd 16.09%	3rd 15.91%	1st 37.85%	1st 45.08%	2nd 34.29%	1st 45.40%	1st 46.00%	Winner; 56.18%
Jörn	2nd 17.90%	2nd 19.37%	1st 22.01%	1st 23.47%	2nd 17.21%	3rd 12.43%	1st 42.33%	2nd 30.09%	2nd 32.41%	Runner-Up; 43.82%
Tanja	4th 9.37%	4th 9.65%	5th 11.59%	7th 8.69%	6th 8.17%	2nd 13.47%	3rd 9.23%	3rd 14.86%	3rd 21.59%	Eliminated (Day 16)
Rolf	9th 5.19%	7th 6.64%	6th 9.92%	2nd 22.05%	3rd 12.72%	5th 10.04%	4th 7.75%	4th 9.65%	Eliminated (Day 15)	
Aurelio	7th 7.35%	6th 6.89%	7th 7.48%	6th 8.78%	5th 8.32%	4th 10.68%	5th 6.40%	Eliminated (Day 14)		
Walter	1st 18.65%	3rd 17.97%	4th 12.72%	4th 10.66%	4th 8.55%	6th 8.30%	Eliminated (Day 13)			
Rebecca	8th 6.53%	8th 6.04%	3rd 12.82%	5th 10.44%	7th 7.18%	Eliminated (Day 12)				
Sara	6th 7.42%	5th 7.01%	8th 7.37%	Eliminated (Day 10)						
Benjamin	5th 7.80%	9th 5.33%	Eliminated (Day 9)							
Patricia	10th 4.32%	Eliminated (Day 8)								
Angelina	Withdrew (Day 7)									
Bottom two (named in)	Patricia, Rolf	Benjamin, Rebecca	Aurelio, Sara	No Elimination	Rebecca, Tanja	Rolf, Walter	Aurelio, Rolf	Rolf, Tanja	None	
Eliminated	Patricia; 4.32% to save	Benjamin; 5.33% to save	Sara; 7.37% to save	No Elimination	Rebecca; 7.18% to save	Walter; 8.30% to save	Aurelio; 6.40% to save	Rolf; 9.65% to save	Tanja; 21.59% to win	Jörn; 43.82% to win
Eliminated	Patricia; 4.32% to save	Benjamin; 5.33% to save	Sara; 7.37% to save	No Elimination	Rebecca; 7.18% to save	Walter; 8.30% to save	Aurelio; 6.40% to save	Rolf; 9.65% to save	Tanja; 21.59% to win	Maren; 56.18% to win

== Trials (Dschungelprüfungen) ==
Date	Contestant 1	Contestant 2	Trial	Translation	Stars
16 January 2015	Sara Kulka	Aurelio Savina	Sommerfest	Summer Party	6/11 stars
17 January 2015	Sara Kulka	—	Hölle der Finsternis	Hell of Darkness	(trial refused)
18 January 2015	Sara Kulka	—	Schabenfreude	Cockroach's Pleasure	7/11 stars
19 January 2015	Angelina Heger	—	Atemlos durch den Schacht	Breathless through the pit	10/11 stars
20 January 2015	Walter Freiwald	Jörn Schlönvoigt	Kleine Dschungelkneipe	Little Jungle Pub	5/11 stars
21 January 2015	Walter Freiwald	Tanja Tischewitsch	Am schlauchenden Band	At the running Flowbelt	6/11 stars
22 January 2015	Walter Freiwald	—	Teufels Küche	Hell's Kitchen	1/11 stars
23 January 2015	Walter Freiwald	Angelina Heger	Schlimms Märchen	Grimm's Scarytales	4/11 stars
24 January 2015	Benjamin Boyce	Maren Gilzer	Unglücksrad	Wheel of Misfortune	2/9 stars
25 January 2015	Rebecca Siemoneit- Barum	—	Dschungelmuseum	Jungle Museum	1/8 stars
26 January 2015	Rolf Scheider	—	Hölle der Finsternis (Teil 2)	Hell of Darkness (Part 2)	5/7 stars
27 January 2015	Maren Gilzer	Jörn Schlönvoigt	Rasthof Würgenich	Resting place Würgenich	5/7 stars
28 January 2015	Rolf Scheider	Tanja Tischewitsch	Schlau oder Schlotze	Smart or Slime	2/6 stars
29 January 2015	Jörn Schlönvoigt	—	Harter Brocken	Hard Boulder	5/5 stars
30 January 2015	Maren Gilzer	Tanja Tischewitsch	Die Tribute von Murwillumbah	The Tributes of Murwillumbah	1/4 stars
31 January 2015	Maren Gilzer	—	Schlangengrube	Snakepit	5/5 stars
31 January 2015	Tanja Tischewitsch	—	Schnicks wie weg	—	4/5 stars
31 January 2015	Jörn Schlönvoigt	—	Voll auf die Glocke	Full on the Bell	5/5 stars

=== Statistics ===
Walter Freiwald, Jörn Schlönvoigt, Tanja Tischewitsch and Maren Gilzer completed the most trials (4). Patricia Blanco was the season's only contestant to not attended a trial. The contestants won 69 of 149 possible stars – more precisely: 68 and 1/2 stars. This is a percentage of 46%.

Contestant	Trials	Awarded stars	Possible stars	Percentage	Rank by percentage
Jörn	4	20	28	71%	1
Angelina	2	14	20	70%	2
Tanja	4	13	23	57%	3
Aurelio	1	6	11	55%	4
Rolf	2	7	13	54%	5
Maren	4	13	25	52%	6
Sarah	3	13	33	39%	7
Walter	4	16	44	36%	8
Benjamin	1	2	9	22%	9
Rebecca	1	1	8	13%	10
Patricia	0	0	0	0%	11

== Ratings ==
Episode	Date	Viewers		Market share	
Episode	Date	Total	14 to 49 years	as 3 years	14 to 49 years
1	16 January 2015	7.50 Mio.	4.24 Mio.	28.7%	41.9%
2	17 January 2015	7.23 Mio.	4.14 Mio.	28.0%	41.8%
3	18 January 2015	5.64 Mio.	3.36 Mio.	21.3%	33.1%
4	19 January 2015	6.68 Mio.	3.56 Mio.	28.6%	39.2%
5	20 January 2015	6.36 Mio.	3.62 Mio.	31.0%	45.0%
6	21 January 2015	6.41 Mio.	3.42 Mio.	28.6%	39.9%
7	22 January 2015	6.36 Mio.	3.58 Mio.	27.5%	38.9%
8	23 January 2015	6.71 Mio.	3.59 Mio.	28.3%	38.4%
9	24 January 2015	7.44 Mio.	4.15 Mio.	30.0%	42.3%
10	25 January 2015	6.15 Mio.	3.65 Mio.	22.9%	34.3%
11	26 January 2015	6.50 Mio.	3.52 Mio.	27.5%	38.5%
12	27 January 2015	6.29 Mio.	3.40 Mio.	30.6%	42.0%
13	28 January 2015	6.67 Mio.	3.66 Mio.	29.0%	40.9%
14	29 January 2015	6.17 Mio.	3.30 Mio.	26.9%	36.8%
15	30 January 2015	6.28 Mio.	3.29 Mio.	22.6%	31.4%
16 (Finale)	31 January 2015	7.43 Mio.	4.08 Mio.	32.8%	45.7%
17 ("The Great Reunion")	1 February 2015				
18 ("Welcome Home-Special")	15 February 2015				
