= Daniele Negroni =

German-Italian singer

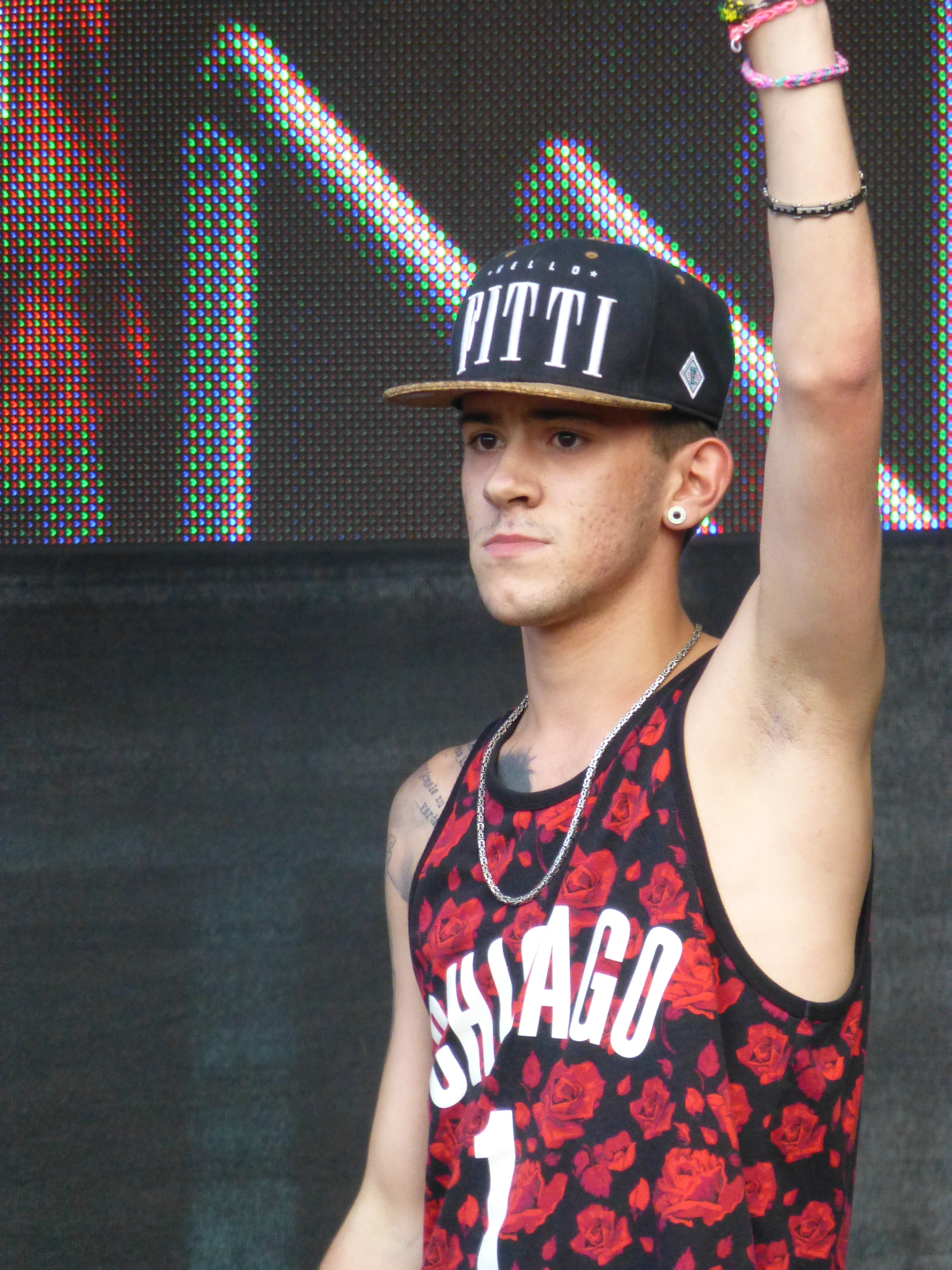
- Negroni in 2014
- Born: Daniele Negroni; 31 July 1995 (age 31); Arona, Italy
- Occupations: Singer and television personality

Daniele Negroni (born 31 July 1995) is a German-Italian singer and television personality, known for being the runner-up in season 9 of Deutschland sucht den Superstar and the twelfth season of Ich bin ein Star – Holt mich hier raus!.

== Early life ==
Negroni was born in Arona, Italy, and currently resides in Nersingen, Germany. He was recently in an apprenticeship for being a chef. He can play the drums and guitar. He is a fan of James Blunt, James Morrison and Xavier Naidoo. He plays football and is a big fan of Borussia Mönchengladbach.

== DSDS ==
In an argument with fellow DSDS candidate Kristof Hering, Negroni called Kristof a "faggot", but apologised for it later on. He became the runner-up in season 9 of DSDS.

=== Performances ===
Show (Original airdate)	Song (artist)	Percentage of calls
Top 16 (25 February 2012)	"Forget You" (Cee Lo Green)	
Top 10 (3 March 2012)	"Beautiful Girls" (Sean Kingston)	
Top 9 (10 March 2012)	"All Summer Long" (Kid Rock)	
Top 8 (17 March 2012)	"Oh Jonny" (Jan Delay)	
Top 7 (24 March 2012)	"Ab in den Süden" (Buddy & DJ The Wave)	
Top 6 (31 March 2012)	"Forgive Forget" (Caligola)	
Top 6 (31 March 2012)	"Y.M.C.A" (Village People) (duet with Kristof Hering)	
Top 5 (7 April 2012)	"It's My Life" (Bon Jovi)	
Top 5 (7 April 2012)	"Cello" (Udo Lindenberg ft. Clueso)	
Top 4 (14 April 2012)	"No Matter What" (Boyzone)	
Top 4 (14 April 2012)	"Sex on Fire" (Kings of Leon)	
Top 4 (14 April 2012)	"Knockin' on Heaven's Door" (Bob Dylan)	
Top 3 (21 April 2012)	"Wherever You Will Go" (The Calling)	
Top 3 (21 April 2012)	"Drive By" (Train)	
Top 3 (21 April 2012)	"Beggin'" (Madcon)	
Top 2 (28 April 2012)	"Dance with Somebody" (Mando Diao)	47,15% (2/2)
Top 2 (28 April 2012)	"Forgive Forget" (Caligola)	47,15% (2/2)
Top 2 (28 April 2012)	"Don't Think About Me" (Winner's Single)	47,15% (2/2)

== Post-DSDS ==
Negroni's debut album did better than the debut album of Luca Hänni; who won season 9 of DSDS.

== Discography ==
=== Studio albums ===
List of albums, with selected chart positions
Title	Album details	Peak chart positions			Sales
Title	Album details	GER	AUT	SWI	Sales
Crazy	Released: 25 May 2012; Label: Universal; Format: CD, Music download	2	1	2	100,000+
Bulletproof	Released: 12 April 2013; Label: Universal; Format: CD, Music download	7	5	38	

=== Singles ===
List of singles, with selected chart positions and certifications
Title	Year	Peak chart positions			Album
Title	Year	GER	AUT	SWI	Album
"Absolutely Right"	2012	15	18	20	Crazy
"I Like It Hot"	2012	45	—	—	Crazy
"Hold on My Heart"	2013	40	66	—	Bulletproof
"Why Do I Do"	2013	—	—	—	Bulletproof
"—" denotes a title that was not released or did not chart in that territory.

=== Other charted songs ===
List of singles, with selected chart positions and certifications
Title	Year	Peak chart positions			Album
Title	Year	GER	AUT	SWI	Album
"Don't Think About Me"	2012	4	3	2	Crazy
"Forgive Forget"	2012	—	64	45	Crazy
"Oh Jonny"	2012	—	68	62	Crazy
"Cello"	2012	—	75	—	Crazy
"—" denotes a title that was not released or did not chart in that territory.
