= Deutschland sucht den Superstar season 9 =

Season of television series

Deutschland sucht den Superstar
- Season 9
- Judges: Dieter Bohlen; Bruce Darnell; Natalie Horler
- Winner: Luca Hänni
- Runner-up: Daniele Negroni

Release
- Original network: RTL
- Original release: 7 January – 27 April 2012

Season chronology
- ← Previous; Season 8 Next → Season 10

The ninth season of Deutschland sucht den Superstar was broadcast on German channel RTL from 7 January to 27 April 2012. Luca Hänni won the series. Jury members Fernanda Brandão and Patrick Nuo left DSDS and were replaced by Bruce Darnell and Cascada's Natalie Horler. As the winner, Luca Hänni received a recording contract with Universal Music Group and €500,000. Participants must be living in Germany, Austria and Switzerland. For the first time, the age limit was relaxed. The auditions stage had 34 audition events in 33 cities across Germany, Austria or Switzerland. 35,401 participants auditioned for season 9. Marco Schreyl will not be returning to host season 10.

== Production ==
Changes include Fernanda Brandão and Patrick Nuo leaving the DSDS jury immediately after season 8 and were replaced by Bruce Darnell and Cascada's Natalie Horler. RTL decided to have a "Top 16" instead of a "Top 15". Participants sang in duets in the Top 6.

The audition cities were Soltau, Saarbrücken, Trier, Mannheim, Karlsdorf, Munich, Landshut, Stuttgart, Nuremberg, Freiburg, Zurich, Bern, Graz, Salzburg, Berlin, Dresden, Leipzig, Magdeburg, Rostock, Bremen, Hamburg, Hanover, Osnabrück, Cologne, Dortmund, Koblenz, Aachen, Schüttorf, Vienna, Frankfurt, Kassel, Münster, Essen and a second time in Cologne. There were 35.401 participants that auditioned for season 9. Production for the Top 36 was in the Maldives.

== The jury and host ==
Dieter Bohlen was born on 7 February 1954 in Oldenburg. He has been a judge on DSDS since season 1. He got his first job as a composer and producer in 1979. He is now the most successful German composer and producer. Bohlen and Thomas Anders, as members of Modern Talking, are the only German act with five titles in a row at number 1 on the German singles chart.

Season 9 is Natalie Horler's first season on the jury panel. She is the lead singer for Cascada. She was born in the United Kingdom and grew up in Germany. Horler is the daughter of David Horler.

Bruce Darnell was born on 19 July 1957 in the US state of Colorado. He grew up in New York City. In 1983, he began his career as a model in Munich. He later moved to Cologne to continue his career as a model. Since 1990, Darnell worked as a choreographer and trained models for the catwalk. He was a judge on Germany's Next Topmodel and Das Supertalent. He replaced Patrick Nuo for season 9.

Marco Schreyl has been the host of DSDS since season 3. He was born on 1 January 1974 in Erfurt, East Germany and is a graduate of the University of Jena. He has also hosted Das Supertalent.

== Auditions ==
The auditions for season 9 started on 27 August 2011. The deadline to apply for auditions was 15 August 2011. Participants must be between the ages of 16 and 30 and living in Germany, Austria or Switzerland. 34 Audition events were held in 33 cities.

== "Recall" ==
The first recall show aired on 4 February. The 135 candidates who advanced to the Recall were split up into groups where the judges picked 60 candidates for the next round. The 60 candidates who advanced participated in groups and duets. The Top 36 went to the Maldives. Ole Jahn left voluntarily in the Top 36 for health reasons.

== Finalists ==
(Ages stated at time of contest)

Contestant	Age	Hometown	Voted off	Liveshow theme
Luca Hänni	17	Uetendorf, Switzerland	Winner	Grand Finale
Daniele Negroni	16	Regensburg	28 April 2012	Grand Finale
Jesse Ritch	20	Urtenen-Schönbühl, Switzerland	21 April 2012	Semifinal
Fabienne Rothe	16	Dormagen	14 April 2012	Pop, Rock & Classic
Joey Heindle	18	Freising	7 April 2012	Power Song vs. Unplugged
Kristof Hering	23	Hamburg	31 March 2012	Solo & Duets
Hamed Anousheh	25	Cologne	24 March 2012	Let's Go to the South
Vanessa Krasniqi	17	Iserlohn	17 March 2012	Songs from the Heart for You
Silvia Amaru	21	Hamburg	10 March 2012	Party Hits
Thomas Pegram	27	Hohenems, Austria	3 March 2012	Hammer Hits

== Top 16 – "Jetzt oder nie" (Now or Never) ==
Original airdate: 25 February 2012

Contestants	Song (Artist)	Percentage of calls
Ursula James	We Found Love (Rihanna)	2,70% (13/16)
Daniele Negroni	Forget You (Cee Lo Green)	12,97% (3/16)
Fabienne Rothe	Just Hold Me (Maria Mena)	5,63% (7/16)
Christian Schöne	I Want to Break Free (Queen)	3,60% (11/16)
Marcello Ciurlia	Summer of '69 (Bryan Adams)	2,57% (14/16)
Angel Burjansky	Get Here (Oleta Adams)	1,81% (16/16)
Silvia Amaru	I Wanna Dance with Somebody (Whitney Houston)	3,65% (10/16)
Jesse Ritch	Let Me Love You (Mario)	8,00% (4/16)
Kristof Hering	Und es war Sommer (Peter Maffay)	4,26% (8/16)
Dennis Richter	I Won't Let You Go (James Morrison)	2,16% (15/16)
Jana Skolina	The One That Got Away (Katy Perry)	3,21% (12/16)
Hamed Anousheh	Hangover (Taio Cruz)	7,00% (5/16)
Thomas Pegram	You've Got a Friend (Carole King)	3,98% (9/16)
Joey Heindle	Here Without You (3 Doors Down)	14,12% (2/16)
Vanessa Krasniqi	I'll Be There (Mariah Carey)	6,90% (6/16)
Luca Hänni	The A Team (Ed Sheeran)	17,41% (1/16)

- Group Song: "Good Feeling"
- Advancing to Top 10 (Public votes): Vanessa, Jesse, Thomas, Fabienne, Joey, Kristof, Luca, Daniele, Silvia and Hamed.
- Eliminated in the Top 16 Show: Angel, Jana, Marcello, Ursula, Christian and Dennis.

== Theme shows ==
=== Top 10 - "Hammer Hits" ===
Original airdate: 3 March 2012

Contestants	Song (Artist)	Percentage of calls
Silvia Amaru	Domino (Jessie J)	5,84% (8/10)
Kristof Hering	Verdammt, ich lieb' dich (Matthias Reim)	5,53% (9/10)
Thomas Pegram	Man in the Mirror (Michael Jackson)	5,02% (10/10)
Joey Heindle	Hey, Soul Sister (Train)	14,84% (2/10)
Vanessa Krasniqi	Rolling in the Deep (Adele)	11,93% (4/10)
Jesse Ritch	So Sick (Ne-Yo)	7,10% (7/10)
Daniele Negroni	Beautiful Girls (Sean Kingston)	14,39% (3/10)
Fabienne Rothe	Wovon sollen wir träumen (Frida Gold)	10,76% (5/10)
Hamed Anousheh	You Give Me Something (James Morrison)	8,10% (6/10)
Luca Hänni	Baby Can I Hold You (Boyzone)	17,49% (1/10)

- Group Song:"Troublemaker"
- Jury Elimination Forecast: Silvia Amaru
- Bottom 3: Kristof Hering, Thomas Pegram, Silvia Amaru
- Eliminated: Thomas Pegram

=== Top 9 - "Party Hits" ===
Original airdate: 10 March 2012

Contestants	Song (Artist)	Percentage of calls
Kristof Hering	Ai se eu te pego! (Michel Teló)	8,07% (7/9)
Fabienne Rothe	Jungle Drum (Emilíana Torrini)	10,35% (4/9)
Jesse Ritch	Yeah 3x (Chris Brown)	7,66% (8/9)
Silvia Amaru	On the Floor (Jennifer Lopez ft. Pitbull)	5,63% (9/9)
Luca Hänni	Baby (Justin Bieber)	17,66% (1/9)
Daniele Negroni	All Summer Long (Kid Rock)	14,51% (3/9)
Vanessa Krasniqi	Titanium (David Guetta ft. Sia)	9,48% (6/9)
Joey Heindle	Crying at the Discoteque (Alcazar)	16,61% (2/9)
Hamed Anousheh	Give Me Everything (Ne-Yo ft. Pitbull)	10,03% (5/9)

- Group Song:"Party Rock Anthem"
- Jury Elimination Forecast: Silvia Amaru or Joey Heindle
- Bottom 3: Silvia Amaru, Kristof Hering & Jesse Ritch
- Eliminated: Silvia Amaru

=== Top 8 - "Herzensongs für dich" (Songs from the heart for you) ===
Original airdate: 17 March 2012

Contestants	Song (Artist)	Percentage of calls
Daniele Negroni	Oh Johnny (Jan Delay)	15,27% (2/8)
Jesse Ritch	Just the Way You Are (Bruno Mars)	9,58% (5/8)
Kristof Hering	So Bist Du (Peter Maffay)	7,46% (7/8)
Fabienne Rothe	Mercy (Duffy)	9,69% (4/8)
Vanessa Krasniqi	Bleeding Love (Leona Lewis)	7,38% (8/8)
Hamed Anousheh	Moves Like Jagger (Maroon 5)	9,14% (6/8)
Luca Hänni	Use Somebody (in the version of Laura Jansen)	14,89% (3/8)
Joey Heindle	Der Weg (Herbert Grönemeyer)	26,59% (1/8)

- Group Song: "I Came for You"
- Jury Elimination Forecast: Joey Heindle
- Bottom 3: Kristof Hering, Hamed Anousheh & Vanessa Krasniqi
- Eliminated: Vanessa Krasniqi

=== Top 7 - "Ab in den Süden" (Let's go to the South) ===
Original airdate: 24 March 2012

Contestants	Song (Artist)	Percentage of calls
Jesse Ritch	Danza Kuduro (Lucenzo ft. Don Omar)	9,77% (6/7)
Fabienne Rothe	36 Grad (2raumwohnung)	24,33% (1/7)
Kristof Hering	Über Den Wolken (Dieter Thomas Kuhn)	10,67% (5/7)
Luca Hänni	Fields of Gold (Sting)	15,67% (3/7)
Hamed Anousheh	Heart Skips a Beat (Olly Murs ft. Rizzle Kicks)	8,88% (7/7)
Joey Heindle	Love Is in the Air (John Paul Young)	16,31% (2/7)
Daniele Negroni	Ab In Den Süden (Buddy & DJ The Wave)	14,37% (4/7)

- Group Song:"I Was Made for Lovin' You"
- Jury Elimination Forecast:Joey Heindle & Kristof Hering
- Bottom 3: Hamed Anousheh, Kristof Hering & Jesse Ritch
- Eliminated: Hamed Anousheh

=== Top 6 - "Solo & Duets" ===
Original airdate: 31 March 2012

Contestants	Song (Artist)	Percentage of calls
Fabienne Rothe	Higher (Taio Cruz ft. Kylie Minogue)	
Jesse Ritch	Higher (Taio Cruz ft. Kylie Minogue)	
Daniele Negroni	Y.M.C.A (Village People)	
Kristof Hering	Y.M.C.A (Village People)	
Joey Heindle	Hero (Enrique Iglesias)	
Luca Hänni	Hero (Enrique Iglesias)	
Jesse Ritch	DJ Got Us Fallin' in Love (Usher)	21,41% (1/6)
Fabienne Rothe	New Soul (Yael Naim)	16,14% (5/6)
Daniele Negroni	Forgive Forget (Caligola)	17,39% (3/6)
Kristof Hering	Joana (Roland Kaiser)	9,42% (6/6)
Luca Hänni	You and Me (in My Pocket) (Milow)	19,47% (2/6)
Joey Heindle	Bitte hör nicht auf zu träumen (Xavier Naidoo)	16,17% (4/6)

- Group Song: "Without You"
- Jury Elimination Forecast: Jesse Ritch & Kristof Hering
- Bottom 3: Joey Heindle, Kristof Hering & Fabienne Rothe
- Eliminated: Kristof Hering

=== Top 5 - "Power Song vs. Unplugged" ===
Original airdate: 7 April 2012

Contestants	Song (Artist)	Percentage of calls
Fabienne Rothe	"Someone like You" (Adele)	17,32% (4/5)
Fabienne Rothe	"Hello" (Martin Solveig ft. Dragonette)	17,32% (4/5)
Jesse Ritch	"Breathing" (Jason Derulo)	21,66% (3/5)
Jesse Ritch	"Breathe Easy" (Blue)	21,66% (3/5)
Daniele Negroni	"Cello" (Udo Lindenberg ft. Clueso)	23,59% (1/5)
Daniele Negroni	"It's My Life" (Bon Jovi)	23,59% (1/5)
Joey Heindle	"Grenade" (Bruno Mars)	15,57% (5/5)
Joey Heindle	"Behind Blue Eyes" (Limp Bizkit)	15,57% (5/5)
Luca Hänni	"Hey There Delilah" (Plain White T's)	21,86% (2/5)
Luca Hänni	"Wonderful Life" (Hurts)	21,86% (2/5)

- Group Song: "Don't Wanna Go Home"
- Jury Elimination Forecast: Fabienne Rothe & Joey Heindle
- Bottom 3: Jesse Ritch, Fabienne Rothe & Joey Heindle
- Eliminated: Joey Heindle

=== Top 4 - "Pop, Rock & Classic" ===
Original airdate: 14 April 2012

Contestants	Song (Artist)	Percentage of calls
Fabienne Rothe	"Hot N Cold" (Katy Perry)	20,31% (4/4)
Fabienne Rothe	"Black Velvet" (Alannah Myles)	20,31% (4/4)
Fabienne Rothe	"Liebe ist Alles" (Rosenstolz)	20,31% (4/4)
Jesse Ritch	"She Doesn't Mind" (Sean Paul)	25,70% (3/4)
Jesse Ritch	"The Final Countdown" (Europe)	25,70% (3/4)
Jesse Ritch	"Earth Song" (Michael Jackson)	25,70% (3/4)
Daniele Negroni	"No Matter What" (Boyzone)	27,97% (1/4)
Daniele Negroni	"Sex on Fire" (Kings of Leon)	27,97% (1/4)
Daniele Negroni	"Knockin' on Heaven's Door" (Guns N' Roses)	27,97% (1/4)
Luca Hänni	"Beautiful People" (Chris Brown ft. Benny Benassi)	26,02% (2/4)
Luca Hänni	"Chasing Cars" (Snow Patrol)	26,02% (2/4)
Luca Hänni	"Eisener Steg" (Philipp Poisel)	26,02% (2/4)

- Group Song: "Turn This Club Around"
- Jury Elimination Forecast: Fabienne Rothe
- Bottom 2: Fabienne Rothe & Jesse Ritch
- Eliminated: Fabienne Rothe

=== Top 3 - Semi-Final ===
Original airdate: 21 April 2012

Contestants	Song (Artist)	Percentage of calls
Daniele Negroni	"Wherever You Will Go" (The Calling)	34,62% (1/3)
Daniele Negroni	"Drive By" (Train)	34,62% (1/3)
Daniele Negroni	"Beggin'" (Madcon)	34,62% (1/3)
Jesse Ritch	"Die Erste Träne" (Bisou)	32,55% (3/3)
Jesse Ritch	"Every Breath You Take" (The Police)	32,55% (3/3)
Jesse Ritch	"Unbelievable" (Craig David)	32,55% (3/3)
Luca Hänni	"Das Beste" (Silbermond)	32,83% (2/3)
Luca Hänni	"The Man Who Can't Be Moved" (The Script)	32,83% (2/3)
Luca Hänni	"Ma Chèrie" (DJ Antoine)	32,83% (2/3)

- Group Song: "Relight My Fire" & "Live My Life"
- Jury Elimination Forecast: The jury was indecisive.
- Bottom 2: Jesse Ritch & Luca Hänni
- Eliminated: Jesse Ritch

=== Top 2 - Final (Contestants' Choice, Highlight Song & Winner's Single) ===
Original airdate: 28 April 2012

Contestants	Song (Artist)	Percentage of calls
Daniele Negroni	"Dance with Somebody" (Mando Diao)	47,15% (2/2)
Daniele Negroni	"Forgive Forget" (Caligola)	47,15% (2/2)
Daniele Negroni	"Don't Think About Me" (Winner's Single)	47,15% (2/2)
Luca Hänni	"Allein, Allein" (Polarkreis 18)	52,85% (1/2)
Luca Hänni	"The A Team" (Ed Sheeran)	52,85% (1/2)
Luca Hänni	"Don't Think About Me" (Winner's Single)	52,85% (1/2)

- Group Song: "Good Feeling" (Top 10 Finalists), "There She Goes" & "Almost Lover" (Daniele & Luca)
- Jury's Forecast of who will win: /
- Winner: Luca Hänni
- Runner-Up: Daniele Negroni

== Elimination chart ==
Female	Male	Top 16	Top 10	Winner

Safe	Safe First	Safe Last	Eliminated

Stage:		Semi-Final	Finals								
Week:		2/25	3/3	3/10	3/17	3/24	3/31	4/7	4/14	4/21	4/28
Place	Contestant	Result									
1	Luca Hänni	1st 17.41%	1st 17.49%	1st 17.66%	3rd 14.89%	3rd 15.67%	2nd 19.47%	2nd 21.86%	2nd 26.02%	2nd 32.83%	1st 52.85%
2	Daniele Negroni	3rd 12.97%	3rd 14.39%	3rd 14.51%	2nd 15.27%	4th 14.37%	3rd 17.39%	1st 23.59%	1st 27.97%	1st 34.62%	2nd 47.15%
3	Jesse Ritch	4th 8.00%	7th 7.10%	8th 7.66%	5th 9.58%	6th 9.77%	1st 21.41%	3rd 21.66%	3rd 25.70%	3rd 32.55%	
4	Fabienne Rothe	7th 5.63%	5th 10.76%	4th 10.35%	4th 9.69%	1st 24.33%	5th 16.14%	4th 17.32%	4th 20.31%		
5	Joey Heindle	2nd 14.12%	2nd 14.84%	2nd 16.61%	1st 26.59%	2nd 16.31%	4th 16.17%	5th 15.57%			
6	Kristof Hering	8th 4.26%	9th 5.53%	7th 8.07%	7th 7.46%	5th 10.67%	6th 9.42%				
7	Hamed Anousheh	5th 7.00%	6th 8.10%	5th 10.03%	6th 9.14%	7th 8.88%					
8	Vanessa Krasniqi	6th 6.90%	4th 11.93%	6th 9.48%	8th 7.38%						
9	Silvia Amaru	10th 3.65%	8th 5.84%	9th 5.63%							
10	Thomas Pegram	9th 3.98%	10th 5.02%								
11	Christian Schöne	11th 3.60%									
12	Jana Skolina	12th 3.21%									
13	Ursula James	13th 2.70%									
14	Marcello Ciurlia	14th 2.57%									
15	Dennis Richter	15th 2.16%									
16	Angel Burjansky	16th 1.81%									

- On 24 February, Thomas Pegram became the 16th contestant after Bohlen chose him, which resulted in six instead of five contestants being eliminated on 25 February.
- On 25 February, the public vote for the first time since season 4, the Top 10 alone. The judges did not have any rights to choose any contestants like in the seasons before.

== Top 10 candidates ==
=== Luca Hänni ===
Luca Hänni was born on 8 October 1994 in Uetendorf, Switzerland. He was in an apprenticeship for bricklaying at the time. He can play the piano and the guitar and is a fan of Justin Bieber. He's considered a sex symbol on this show. He has been compared to Alexander Klaws. Luca was considered Dieter Bohlen's favorite to win the competition and eventually went on to win, becoming the first winner from Switzerland. At age 17, he became the youngest winner-to-date to win DSDS. He only stayed 2,5 minutes for the after-show party after he won season 9. As the winner, he received a recording contract with Universal Music Group and €500,000.

Show (Original airdate)	Song (Artist)	Percentage of calls
Top 16 (25 February 2012)	"The A Team" (Ed Sheeran)	17,44% (1/16)
Top 10 (3 March 2012)	"Baby Can I Hold You" (Boyzone)	17,49% (1/10)
Top 9 (10 March 2012)	"Baby" (Justin Bieber)	17,66% (1/9)
Top 8 (17 March 2012)	"Use Somebody" (in the version of Laura Jansen)	14,89% (3/8)
Top 7 (24 March 2012)	"Fields of Gold" (Sting)	15,67% (3/7)
Top 6 (31 March 2012)	"You and Me (in My Pocket)" (Milow)	19,47% (2/6)
Top 6 (31 March 2012)	"Hero" (Enrique Iglesias) (duet with Joey Heindle)	19,47% (2/6)
Top 5 (7 April 2012)	"Wonderful Life" (Hurts)	21,86% (2/5)
Top 5 (7 April 2012)	"Hey There Delilah" (Plain White T's)	21,86% (2/5)
Top 4 (14 April 2012)	"Beautiful People" (Chris Brown ft. Benny Benassi)	26,02% (2/4)
Top 4 (14 April 2012)	"Chasing Cars" (Snow Patrol)	26,02% (2/4)
Top 4 (14 April 2012)	"Eisener Steg" (Philipp Poisel)	26,02% (2/4)
Top 3 (21 April 2012)	"Das Beste" (Silbermond)	32,83% (2/3)
Top 3 (21 April 2012)	"The Man Who Can't Be Moved" (The Script)	32,83% (2/3)
Top 3 (21 April 2012)	"Ma Chèrie" (DJ Antoine)	32,83% (2/3)
Top 2 (28 April 2012)	"Allein, Allein" (Polarkreis 18)	52,85% (1/2)
Top 2 (28 April 2012)	"The A Team" (Ed Sheeran)	52,85% (1/2)
Top 2 (28 April 2012)	"Don't Think About Me" (Winner's Single)	52,85% (1/2)

=== Daniele Negroni ===
Daniele Negroni was born on 31 July 1995 in Arona, Italy. He can play the drums and is a fan of James Blunt, James Morrison and Xavier Naidoo. He has played for and a fan of football club Borussia Mönchengladbach. He is a heavy smoker. In a conflict with fellow DSDS candidate Kristof Hering, he called Kristof a "faggot". He became the runner-up behind Luca Hänni.

Show (Original airdate)	Song (Artist)	Percentage of calls
Top 16 (25 February 2012)	"Forget You" (Cee Lo Green)	12,97% (3/16)
Top 10 (3 March 2012)	"Beautiful Girls" (Sean Kingston)	14,39% (3/10)
Top 9 (10 March 2012)	"All Summer Long" (Kid Rock)	14,51% (3/9)
Top 8 (17 March 2012)	"Oh Jonny" (Jan Delay)	15,27% (2/8)
Top 7 (24 March 2012)	"Ab In Den Süden" (Buddy & DJ The Wave)	14,37% (4/7)
Top 6 (31 March 2012)	"Forgive Forget" (Caligola)	17,39% (3/6)
Top 6 (31 March 2012)	"Y.M.C.A" (Village People) (duet with Kristof Hering)	17,39% (3/6)
Top 5 (7 April 2012)	"It's My Life" (Bon Jovi)	23,59% (1/5)
Top 5 (7 April 2012)	"Cello" (Udo Lindenberg ft. Clueso)	23,59% (1/5)
Top 4 (14 April 2012)	"No Matter What" (Boyzone)	27,97% (1/4)
Top 4 (14 April 2012)	"Sex on Fire" (Kings of Leon)	27,97% (1/4)
Top 4 (14 April 2012)	"Knockin' on Heaven's Door" (Guns N' Roses)	27,97% (1/4)
Top 3 (21 April 2012)	"Wherever You Will Go" (The Calling)	34,62% (1/3)
Top 3 (21 April 2012)	"Drive By" (Train)	34,62% (1/3)
Top 3 (21 April 2012)	"Beggin'" (Madcon)	34,62% (1/3)
Top 2 (28 April 2012)	"Dance with Somebody" (Mando Diao)	47,15% (2/2)
Top 2 (28 April 2012)	"Forgive Forget" (Caligola)	47,15% (2/2)
Top 2 (28 April 2012)	"Don't Think About Me" (Winner's Single)	47,15% (2/2)

=== Jesse Ritch ===
Jesse-Ritch Kama-Kalonji was born on 19 February 1992 in Urtenen-Schönbühl, Switzerland. He won a regional music competition in 2006. He has had minor roles in weddings and sang in a gospel choir. He took piano and singing lessons for five years in classical and pop and taught himself to play the guitar. His father is from the Congo. He likes to relax with singing, listening to music, cooking, or for a cozy evening with his girlfriend in front of the television. Music, shopping and football are among his biggest hobbies. He was eliminated in the Top 3.

Show (Original airdate)	Song (Artist)	Percentage of calls
Top 16 (25 February 2012)	"Let Me Love You" (Mario)	8,00% (4/16)
Top 10 (3 March 2012)	"So Sick" (Ne-Yo)	7,10% (7/10)
Top 9 (10 March 2012)	"Yeah 3x" (Chris Brown)	7,66% (8/9)
Top 8 (17 March 2012)	"Just the Way You Are" (Bruno Mars)	9,58% (5/8)
Top 7 (24 March 2012)	"Danza Kuduro" (Lucenzo ft. Don Omar)	9,77% (6/7)
Top 6 (31 March 2012)	"DJ Got Us Fallin' in Love" (Usher)	21,41% (1/6)
Top 6 (31 March 2012)	"Higher" (Taio Cruz ft. Kylie Minogue) (duet with Fabienne Rothe)	21,41% (1/6)
Top 5 (7 April 2012)	"Breathing" (Jason Derulo)	21,66% (3/5)
Top 5 (7 April 2012)	"Breathe Easy" (Blue)	21,66% (3/5)
Top 4 (14 April 2012)	"She Doesn't Mind" (Sean Paul)	25,70% (3/4)
Top 4 (14 April 2012)	"The Final Countdown" (Europe)	25,70% (3/4)
Top 4 (14 April 2012)	"Earth Song" (Michael Jackson)	25,70% (3/4)
Top 3 (21 April 2012)	"Die Erste Träne" (Bisou)	32,55% (3/3)
Top 3 (21 April 2012)	"Every Breath You Take" (The Police)	32,55% (3/3)
Top 3 (21 April 2012)	"Unbelievable" (Craig David)	32,55% (3/3)

=== Fabienne Rothe ===
Fabienne Rothe was born on 9 December 1995 in Dormagen. She is a member of the member of the Music Academy of Neuss. She is a fan of Tyler Ward, Justin Bieber and Usher. Before participating on DSDS, she auditioned twice on Das Supertalent in 2010 and 2011, respectively. She was rumoured to be in a relationship with fellow DSDS candidate Hamed Anousheh. Kristof Hering stated that Fabienne and Hamed went to bed with each other. Hamed denied this. Fabienne was crying when Hamed left the DSDS Villa. She told Bravo that "I've never had sex". She was the last female contestant and was eventually eliminated in the Top 4.

Show (Original airdate)	Song (Artist)	Percentage of calls
Top 16 (25 February 2012)	"Just Hold Me" (Maria Mena)	5,63% (7/16)
Top 10 (3 March 2012)	"Wovon sollen wir träumen" (Frida Gold)	10,76% (5/10)
Top 9 (10 March 2012)	"Jungle Drum" (Emilíana Torrini)	10,35% (4/9)
Top 8 (17 March 2012)	"Mercy" (Duffy)	9,69% (4/8)
Top 7 (24 March 2012)	"36 Grad" (2raumwohnung)	24,33% (1/7)
Top 6 (31 March 2012)	"New Soul" (Yael Naim)	16,14% (5/6)
Top 6 (31 March 2012)	"Higher" (Taio Cruz ft. Kylie Minogue) (duet with Jesse Ritch)	16,14% (5/6)
Top 5 (7 April 2012)	"Hello" (Martin Solveig ft. Dragonette)	17,32% (4/5)
Top 5 (7 April 2012)	"Someone Like You" (Adele)	17,32% (4/5)
Top 4 (14 April 2012)	"Hot N Cold" (Katy Perry)	20,31% (4/4)
Top 4 (14 April 2012)	"Black Velvet" (Alannah Myles)	20,31% (4/4)
Top 4 (14 April 2012)	"Liebe ist Alles" (Rosenstolz)	20,31% (4/4)

=== Joey Heindle ===
Joey Heindle was born on 14 May 1993 in Munich. He has five siblings. He trained as an assistant chef and has further training as a chef. He had to cancel training due to a hand injury. He can play the guitar. He has sung at birthday parties. His favourite singers are Elton John and Xavier Naidoo. He went shirtless for his Top 8 performance. He felt uncomfortable going shirtless. Joey stated (about being shirtless) "Actually, I did not want that, but did that because the director wanted." Joey called DSDS jury member Dieter Bohlen a "pussy" for the negative criticism he has given him. After the show, Joey stated "Dieter was a pussy. He's just went out and did not further heard. That was just simply sucks. That would make no man on earth in a talent show. This is an insult to the power of three". Joey also stated that his relationship in the long-term won't suffer because of this and he will forgive Dieter at some point. He was eliminated at the Top 5. Within days of being eliminated, he got a recording contract with music producer Mark Delgardo.

Show (Original airdate)	Song (Artist)	Percentage of calls
Top 16 (25 February 2012)	"Here Without You" (3 Doors Down)	14,12% (2/16)
Top 10 (3 March 2012)	"Hey, Soul Sister" (Train)	14,84% (2/10)
Top 9 (10 March 2012)	"Crying at the Discoteque" (Alcazar)	16,61% (2/9)
Top 8 (17 March 2012)	"Der Weg" (Herbert Grönemeyer)	26,59% (1/8)
Top 7 (24 March 2012)	"Love Is in the Air" (John Paul Young)	16,31% (2/7)
Top 6 (31 March 2012)	"Bitte hör nicht auf zu träumen" (Xavier Naidoo)	16,17% (4/6)
Top 6 (31 March 2012)	"Hero" (Enrique Iglesias) (duet with Luca Hänni)	16,17% (4/6)
Top 5 (7 April 2012)	"Grenade" (Bruno Mars)	15,57% (5/5)
Top 5 (7 April 2012)	"Behind Blue Eyes" (Limp Bizkit)	15,57% (5/5)

=== Kristof Hering ===
Kristof Hering was born on 27 February 1989 in Hanover. He lives with his boyfriend who is 30 years older than him. He has a tattoo on his left ankle. He has an older sister and younger brother. In 2008, he left home and went to a catholic gymnasium where he received his abitur. He is a fan of Udo Jürgens, Robbie Williams and Peter Maffay. He also likes jazz and pop. He likes to go shopping, listening to music, do sports with his friends. He has lost 25 pounds since 2008. He keeps it off by going to the gym three times a week. He was at the Stage-School-Hamburg in 2008 and 2009. His favourite songs includes "Über 7 Brücken" by Peter Maffay and "I Sing A Lied Für Du" by Andreas Gabalier. Kristof was eliminated in the Top 6. Kristof stated that "I'll miss the whole team, but none of the candidates." He believes fellow candidates Luca Hänni, Jesse Ritch and Fabienne Rothe are cold and calculating. suffered verbal and death threats during his participation during season 9 due to his homosexuality. People were writing stuff like "You are sooo gay to .."; "I'll cut your eggs"; "Get out of DSDS, if you value your life" and "I stab you up". RTL filed charges against unknown persons because of the threats.

Show (Original airdate)	Song (Artist)	Percentage of calls
Top 16 (25 February 2012)	"Und es war Sommer" (Peter Maffay)	4,26% (8/16)
Top 10 (3 March 2012)	"Verdammt ich lieb dich" (Matthias Reim)	5,53% (9/10)
Top 9 (10 March 2012)	"Ai se eu te pego!" (Michel Teló)	8,07% (7/9)
Top 8 (17 March 2012)	"So Bist Du" (Peter Maffay)	7,46% (7/8)
Top 7 (24 March 2012)	"Über Den Wolken" (Dieter Thomas Kuhn)	10,67% (5/7)
Top 6 (31 March 2012)	"Joana" (Roland Kaiser)	9,42% (6/6)
Top 6 (31 March 2012)	"Y.M.C.A" (Village People) (duet with Daniele Negroni)	9,42% (6/6)

=== Hamed Anousheh ===
Hamed Anousheh was born on 13 January 1987 in Trier. He currently resides in Cologne. He has an Iranian background. His parents fled Iran because of the Iranian Revolution. His father is among the five masters of Persian flute and played before the Queen. After his birth, the family moved back to Iran. His parents divorced and him and his siblings returned to Germany with their father. He is a fan of Michael Jackson. Hamed was eliminated in the Top 7. Hamed was rumoured to be in a relationship with fellow DSDS candidate Fabienne Rothe. Kristof Hering stated that Hamed and Fabienne went to bed with each other. Hamed denied this. Fabienne was crying hard when he left the DSDS Villa.

Show (Original airdate)	Song (Artist)	Percentage of calls
Top 16 (25 February 2012)	"Hangover" (Taio Cruz)	7,00% (5/16)
Top 10 (3 March 2012)	"You Give Me Something" (James Morrison)	8,10% (6/10)
Top 9 (10 March 2012)	"Give Me Everything" (Ne-Yo ft. Pitbull)	10,03% (5/9)
Top 8 (17 March 2012)	"Moves Like Jagger" (Maroon 5)	9,14% (6/8)
Top 7 (24 March 2012)	"Heart Skips a Beat" (Olly Murs ft. Rizzle Kicks)	8,88% (7/7)

=== Vanessa Krasniqi ===
Vanessa Krasniqi was born on 22 June 1994 in Iserlohn. She is going for her Fachabitur and is currently in the 11th class. Her father is from Kosovo. She has a half-brother name Dardan. She became the fourth place at Das Supertalent in 2008. She was eliminated in the Top 8 on 17 March. Considered a frontrunner of her season, her early elimination shocked the judges and her fellow contestants. RTL stated that she won't return despite angry fans protesting.

Show (Original airdate)	Song (Artist)	Percentage of calls
Top 16 (25 February 2012)	"I'll Be There" (Mariah Carey)	6,90% (6/16)
Top 10 (3 March 2012)	"Rolling in the Deep" (Adele)	11,93% (4/10)
Top 9 (10 March 2012)	"Titanium" (David Guetta ft. Sia)	9,48% (6/9)
Top 8 (17 March 2012)	"Bleeding Love" (Leona Lewis)	7,38% (8/8)

=== Silvia Amaru ===
Silvia Amaru was born in Hamburg on 22 December 1990. She has an Italian background. She has sung for five years at the Alster sparrows and the Hamburg State Opera. She likes soul, R'n'B and Italian music. She is a fan of Alicia Keys, Whitney Houston and Lady Gaga. She was eliminated in the Top 9 on 10 March.

Show (Original airdate)	Song (Artist)	Percentage of calls
Top 16 (25 February 2012)	"I Wanna Dance with Somebody" (Whitney Houston)	3,65% (10/16)
Top 10 (3 March 2012)	"Domino" (Jessie J)	5,84% (8/10)
Top 9 (10 March 2012)	"On the Floor" (Jennifer Lopez ft. Pitbull)	5,63% (9/9)

=== Thomas Pegram ===
Thomas Pegram was born on 14 January 1985 in Hohenems, Austria. His father is American. He can play violin, piano and electric guitar. He sang in his band at age 16 and wrote and recorded his own music in his home. He participated for Austria in the 2004 edition of the Eurovision Song Contest. He became the 16th participant of the Top 16. There had been a "Top 15" in the previous 4 seasons. He was eliminated in the Top 10 on 3 March. He stated in an interview with RTL that one of the reasons why he didn't go further is that the girls didn't consider him a heartthrob and fellow candidate Luca Hänni "can do much better".

Show (Original airdate)	Song (Artist)	Percentage of calls
Top 16 (25 February 2012)	"You've Got a Friend" (Carole King)	3,98% (9/16)
Top 10 (3 March 2012)	"Man in the Mirror" (Michael Jackson)	5,02% (10/10)

== Controversy ==
=== Voting error ===
During the Top 16 show Marco Schreyl read out an incorrect phone number for Christian Schöne. Following complaints that the error may have cost Schöne his place in the competition RTL started voting to see if viewers wanted to reinstate Schöne and give him a second chance. Approximately 1.4 million people voted in the poll, but the majority voted against Schöne returning. The remaining contestants who had already qualified for the "Top 10" announced that they were happy with the result.

=== Producer favouritism ===
On 25 April, three days before the final show was broadcast, Daniele Negroni was declared the winner on RTL's website. Hamburger Morgenpost published an article complaining that "amazingly" RTL were promoting a winners tour for Daniele Negroni "on an RTL ticket page". Another Negroni concert was also announced for 30 June 2012 at the MEP arena in Meppen. In the final TV show Luca Hänni was voted the winner of season 9, with Negroni finishing second.

=== Facebook predictions ===
At the start of the theme shows, the Hamburger Morgenpost suggested that Thomas Pegram's elimination was expected because of some of his statistics on the DSDS Facebook pages. He had the fewest "likes" of all the contestants, with only 4,105 people having clicked the button, and received only 813 comments after the official DSDS Facebook fanpage put up his photo. The following week Hamburger Morgenpost again suggested that Silvia Amaru's elimination was expected as she had the lowest "like" total of the remaining contestants. Silvia Amaru's photo had 4,761 "likes" while her competitors were around 10,000 on Sunday 11 March. The Morgenpost said that it should be "clear" to RTL that "Facebook is a power killer" for Deutschland sucht den Superstar. In the Top Eight show the following week, Kristof Hering had the fewest likes for his photo, but was not voted out of the show.

=== Employment laws ===
The Cologne district government had concerns that the show was violating employment laws that protect children, prohibiting minors from appearing on–stage after 10 PM. The issue had been raised the previous season when the appearance of Sebastian Wurth was judged to have contravened the law, with RTL receiving a 15,000 Euro fine for the incident. The season nine contestants affected were Daniele Negroni (16), Luca Hänni (17), Vanessa Krasniqi (17) and Fabienne Rothe (16). RTL decided to cancel the results shows for 7 April 14 and 21 April to avoid infringing the child labour laws.

=== Homophobia ===
Contestant Kristof Hering suffered abuse and death threats during his participation during season 9 due to being openly gay. Comments were posted on various websites making physical threats against Hering, including "I'll cut your balls"; "Get out of DSDS, if you value your life" and "I'll stab you up", prompting RTL to file charges against various individuals for making the threats. Hering also clashed with fellow contestant Daniele Negroni, with Hering calling Negroni "antisocial" prompting Negroni to publicly call Hering a "faggot".

== Reception ==
TV ratings for season 9 were disappointing. None of the theme shows reached 5 million viewers. Season 1 averaged 8.09 million viewers and season 8 averaged 6.32 million viewers in the show's key demographic (ages 14 to 49). Only 4.71 million people watch the final show of season 9. This is the lowest viewership in the history of all the final shows of DSDS.

== Aftermath ==
The winner, Luca Hänni, received a recording contract with Universal Music Group and €500,000. Within days of being eliminated, Joey Heindle got a recording contract with music producer Mark Delgardo.

Marco Schreyl, who has hosted DSDS since season 3, will not be returning to host season 10. Bruce Darnell and Natalie Horler both left the show after season 9.
