= Let's Dance (German TV series) =

German television series

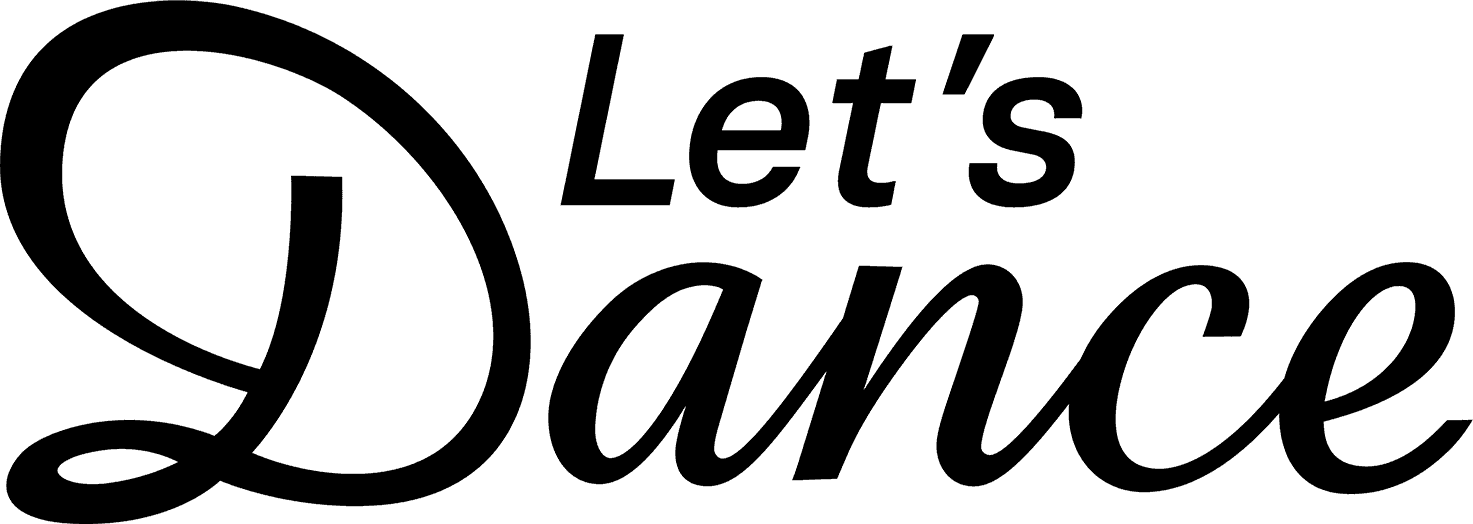
- Genre: Reality competition
- Based on: Strictly Come Dancing
- Presented by: Nazan Eckes; Hape Kerkeling; Daniel Hartwich; Sylvie Meis; Victoria Swarovski
- Judges: Joachim Llambi; Markus Schöffl; Katarina Witt; Michael Hull; Ute Lemper; Isabel Edvardsson; Peter Kraus; Harald Glööckler; Motsi Mabuse; Roman Frieling; Maite Kelly; Jorge González
- Opening theme: Pepe Lienhard Orchester – Let’s Dance TV Theme
- Country of origin: Germany
- Original language: German
- No. of seasons: 19
- No. of episodes: 216

Production
- Production locations: Cologne, Germany (1–2, 4–); Berlin, Germany (3)
- Production companies: ITV Studios Germany (1–7); Seapoint Productions (8–); BBC Studios Germany (8–)

Original release
- Network: RTL
- Release: April 3, 2006 – present

Let's Dance is a German dance competition television series that premiered on April 3, 2006, on RTL and filmed live in Cologne. The show is based on the British reality TV competition Strictly Come Dancing and is part of the Dancing with the Stars franchise.

The format of the show consists of a celebrity paired with a professional dancer. Each couple performs predetermined dances and competes against the others for judges' points and audience votes. The couple receiving the lowest combined total of judges' points and audience votes is eliminated each week until only the champion dance pair remains.

== Format ==
Celebrities dance in the programs with a professional or successful tournament dancer in several dances. At the end of each performance, each jury member gives a score between one and ten. Which couples on the next Let's Dance show will participate and which not, will be determined by the jury rating and the audience, who can vote for their favorites by telephone at the end of the program. The last placed in the jury evaluation receives one point, the penultimate two points and so on. The same applies to the placements of the audience rating. The organizer does not publish the results of the audience rating, numbers of callers or ranking list. The highest placed person receives as many points as there are still couples in the race in the respective episode. Jury and spectator ratings are added together, the pair with the fewest points is eliminated. If there are several last-placed couples with the same rating, the couple with the lowest audience rating will be eliminated.

== Cast ==
=== Hosts ===
Nazan Eckes has been the host for seasons one to three. In season one and two, her co-host was Hape Kerkeling and in season three Daniel Hartwich. Between season four and ten Hartwich has been presenting alongside Sylvie Meis. The program is currently hosted by Hartwich and Austrian singer and former winner Victoria Swarovski. Daniel Hartwich was replaced by Oliver Geissen in the first regular show of season 11 and by Jan Köppen in fifth regular show and the final of season 15. Victoria Swarovski was replaced by Laura Wontorra in the quarter-final of season 19.

Colour key

Host	Contestant

Presenter	Season																		
Presenter	1	2	3	4	5	6	7	8	9	10	11	12	13	14	15	16	17	18	19
Nazan Eckes																			
Hape Kerkeling																			
Daniel Hartwich																			
Sylvie Meis																			
Victoria Swarovski																			

=== Judging panel ===
The judges in season one were Michael Hull, Markus Schöffl, Katarina Witt and Joachim Llambi. In season two Ute Lemper replaced Katarina Witt. The judges in season three were Harald Glööckler, Peter Kraus, Isabel Edvardsson and Joachim Llambi. In season four Roman Frieling replaced Peter Kraus and Motsi Mabuse replaced Isabel Edvardsson. In season five Maite Kelly replaced Harald Glööckler. From season six onwards, the judges are Jorge González, Motsi Mabuse and Joachim Llambi. Dieter Bohlen filled in for Ute Lemper for the season 2 final. Joachim Llambi was replaced by Rúrik Gíslason in the season 15 launch show.

Colour key

Judge	Contestant	Professional

Judge	Season																		
Judge	1	2	3	4	5	6	7	8	9	10	11	12	13	14	15	16	17	18	19
Joachim Llambi																			
Markus Schöffl																			
Katarina Witt																			
Michael Hull																			
Ute Lemper																			
Isabel Edvardsson																			
Peter Kraus																			
Harald Glööckler																			
Motsi Mabuse																			
Roman Frieling																			
Maite Kelly																			
Jorge González																			

=== Professional dancers ===
Color key:

Winner of the season
Runner-up of the season
Third place of the season
Last place of the season
Withdrew or quit in the season
Still participating in the current season

- **Bold** denotes a current professional dancer.

Professional dancer	Season																		
Professional dancer	Season 1	Season 2	Season 3	Season 4	Season 5	Season 6	Season 7	Season 8	Season 9	Season 10	Season 11	Season 12	Season 13	Season 14	Season 15	Season 16	Season 17	Season 18	Season 19
**Alexandru Ionel**														Vanessa Neigert		Alex Mariah Peter	Sophia Thiel	Marie Mouroum	Betty Taube
Alona Uehlin													Sükrü Pehlivan						
**Anastasia Mărușter**																	Tony Bauer	Fabian Hambüchen	Gustav Schäfer
Anastasiya Kravchenko		Markus Majowski																	
Andrzej Cibis										Cheyenne Pahde			Loiza Lamers	Auma Obama	Lilly zu Sayn-Wittgenstein-Berleburg	Natalia Yegorova			
Anna Karina Mosmann	Axel Bulthaupt	Eralp Uzun																	
Cathrin Hissnauer								Miloš Vuković											
Christian Bärens			Sylvie van der Vaart																
Christian Polanc		Susan Sideropoulos	Hillu Schwetje	Maite Kelly	Joana Zimmer	Sıla Şahin	Carmen Geiss	Enissa Amani	Nastassja Kinski	Vanessa Mai	Iris Mareike Steen	Nazan Eckes	Laura Müller	Lola Weippert	Michelle	Sharon Battiste			
Christian Polanc		Susan Sideropoulos	Sylvie van der Vaart	Maite Kelly	Joana Zimmer	Sıla Şahin	Carmen Geiss	Enissa Amani	Nastassja Kinski	Vanessa Mai	Iris Mareike Steen	Nazan Eckes	Laura Müller	Lola Weippert	Michelle	Sharon Battiste			
Christina Hänni										Giovanni Zarrella		Oliver Pocher	Luca Hänni	Jan Hofer	Mike Singer	Ali Güngörmüş		Osan Yaran	
Christine Deck		Ben																	
Dirk Bastert	Heike Henkel																		
**Ekaterina Leonova**						Paul Janke	Patrice Bouédibéla	Matthias Steiner	Julius Brink	Gil Ofarim	Ingolf Lück	Pascal Hens			Bastian Bielendorfer	Timon Krause	Detlef Soost	Diego Pooth	Simon Gosejohann
Erich Klann				Kristina Bach	Magdalena Brzeska	Simone Ballack	Lilly Becker	Cora Schumacher	Victoria Swarovski	Anni Friesinger-Postma	Judith Williams	Sabrina Mockenhaupt	Ilka Bessin						
**Evgeny Vinokurov**												Evelyn Burdecki		Ilse DeLange	Cheyenne Ochsenknecht			Simone Thomalla	Anna-Carina Woitschack
Gennady Bondarenko					Gitte Hænning														
Helena Kaschurow				Jörn Schlönvoigt	Uwe Fahrenkrog-Petersen														
Hendrik Höfken	Heide Simonis	Jasmin Wagner																	
Ilia Russo									Sonja Kirchberger										
Isabel Edvardsson	Wayne Carpendale	Giovane Élber		Tim Lobinger	Patrick Lindner	Tetje Mierendorf	Alexander Klaws	Detlef Steves	Michael Wendler	Maximilian Arland		Benjamin Piwko	Aílton		Riccardo Basile	Knossi			
Jürgen Schlegel		Margarethe Schreinemakers																	
**Kathrin Menzinger**								Hans Sarpei	Ulli Potofski	Heinrich Popow	Heiko Lochmann	Thomas Rath	Tijan Njie	Kai Ebel	René Casselly	Abdelkarim	Mark Keller	Roland Trettl	Jan Kittmann
Katja Kalugina					Ardian Bujupi		Dirk Moritz				Roman Lochmann	Lukas Rieger							
**Malika Dzumaev**														Mickie Krause	Timur Ülker	Younes Zarou	Gabriel Kelly	Ben Zucker	Joel Mattli
**Mariia Maksina**																Mimi Kraus	Stefano Zarrella		Ross Antony
Marius Iepure							Cindy Berger	Cathy Fischer											
**Marta Arndt**					Lars Riedel					Jörg Draeger	Chakall	Özcan Cosar	Martin Klempnow	Erol Sander			Biyon Kattilathu		Milano
**Marta Arndt**					Lars Riedel					Giovanni Zarrella	Chakall	Özcan Cosar	Martin Klempnow	Erol Sander			Biyon Kattilathu		Milano
**Massimo Sinató**			Sophia Thomalla	Liliana Matthäus	Rebecca Mir	Manuela Wisbeck	Larissa Marolt	Minh-Khai Phan-Thi	Jana Pallaske	Angelina Kirsch	Julia Dietze	Barbara Becker	Lili Paul-Roncalli		Amira Pocher	Sally Özcan	Lulu	Paola Maria	Esther Schweins
Melissa Ortiz-Gomez			Raúl Richter	Moritz A. Sachs	Patrick Bach	Manuel Cortez													
Mika Tatarkin																	Maria Clara Groppler		
Motsi Mabuse		Guildo Horn	Rolfe Scheider																
Nikita Bazev						Gülcan Kamps													
Nikita Kuzmin													Sabrina Setlur						
Nina Uszkureit			Arthur Abraham	Bernd Herzsprung															
Oana Nechiti						Jürgen Milski	Alexander Leipold	Ralf Bauer	Eric Stehfest	Faisal Kawusi	Bela Klentze								
Oliver Seefeldt	Wolke Hegenbarth	Katja Ebstein																	
Oliver Tienken			Brigitte Nielsen																
Oti Mabuse								Daniel Küblböck	Niels Ruf										
Oxana Lebedew									Attila Hildmann										
Pasha Zvychaynyy														Kim Riekenberg					
**Patricija Ionel**														Simon Zachenhuber	Hardy Krüger jr.	Philipp Boy	Tillman Schulz	Taliso Engel	Willi Banner
Paul Lorenz								Katja Burkard									Eva Padberg		
Regina Luca								Thomas Drechsel	Thomas Häßler		Thomas Hermanns	Kerstin Ott	John Kelly						
Renata Lusin											Jimi Blue Ochsenknecht	Jan Hartmann	Moritz Hans	Rúrik Gíslason	Mathias Mester			Marc Eggers	
Robert Beitsch									Sarah Lombardi	Susi Kentikian	Jessica Paszka	Ulrike Frank	Steffi Jones	Senna Gammour					
Roberto Albanese	Sandy Mölling		Nina Bott																
Sarah Latton			Achim Mentzel	Thomas Karaoglan	Marc Terenzi	Balian Buschbaum	Bernhard Brink			Bastiaan Ragas									
Sarah Latton			Achim Mentzel	Thomas Karaoglan	Marc Terenzi	Balian Buschbaum	Bernhard Brink			Maximilian Arland									
Sascha Karabey		Jenny Elvers-Elbertzhagen																	
Sergiu Luca								Panagiota Petridou	Alessandra Meyer-Wölden	Ann-Kathrin Brömmel	Barbara Meier								
Sergiu Mărușter																		Leyla Lahouar	
Sergiy Plyuta				Regina Halmich	Stefanie Hertel														
Sofia Bogdanova	Jochen Horst																		
Stefano Terrazzino				Andrea Sawatzki	Mandy Capristo	Marijke Amado													
Tatjana Kuschill			Mathieu Carrière																
Uta Deharde	Jürgen Hingsen																		
**Vadim Garbuzov**								Beatrice Richter	Franziska Traub	Chiara Ohoven	Tina Ruland			Nicolas Puschmann	Sarah Mangione	Chryssanthi Kavazi	Jana Wosnitza	Jeanette Biedermann	Nadja Benaissa
**Vadim Garbuzov**								Beatrice Richter	Sonja Kirchberger	Chiara Ohoven	Tina Ruland			Nicolas Puschmann	Sarah Mangione	Chryssanthi Kavazi	Jana Wosnitza	Jeanette Biedermann	Nadja Benaissa
**Valentin Lusin**											Charlotte Würdig	Ella Endlich	Ulrike von der Groeben	Valentina Pahde	Caroline Bosbach	Anna Ermakova	Ann-Kathrin Bendixen	Christine Neubauer	Sonya Kraus
**Vica Sauerwald**																			Vanessa Borck
Willi Gabalier							Tanja Szewczenko												
**Zsolt Sándor Cseke**															Janin Ullmann	Julia Beautx	Lina Larissa Strahl	selfiesandra	Bibi Heinicke

== Series overview ==
Season	Couples	Weeks	Duration dates		Placements		
Season	Couples	Weeks	Premiere	Finale	First place	Second place	Third place
1	8	8	April 3, 2006	May 21, 2006	Wayne Carpendale & Isabel Edvardsson	Wolke Hegenbarth & Oliver Seefeldt	Sandy Mölling & Roberto Albanese
2	10	8	May 14, 2007	June 30, 2007	Susan Sideropoulos & Christian Polanc	Katja Ebstein & Oliver Seefeldt	Giovane Élber & Isabel Edvardsson
3	10	8	April 9, 2010	May 28, 2010	Sophia Thomalla & Massimo Sinató	Sylvie van der Vaart & Christian Polanc, Christian Bärens	Nina Bott & Roberto Albanese
4	10	9	March 23, 2011	May 18, 2011	Maite Kelly & Christian Polanc	Moritz A. Sachs & Melissa Ortiz-Gomez	Thomas Karaoglan & Sarah Latton
5	12	11	March 14, 2012	May 23, 2012	Magdalena Brzeska & Erich Klann	Rebecca Mir & Massimo Sinató	Stefanie Hertel & Sergiy Plyuta
6	10	9	April 5, 2013	May 31, 2013	Manuel Cortez & Melissa Ortiz-Gomez	Sıla Şahin & Christian Polanc	Paul Janke & Ekaterina Leonova
7	10	9	March 28, 2014	May 30, 2014	Alexander Klaws & Isabel Edvardsson	Tanja Szewczenko & Willi Gabalier	Carmen Geiss & Christian Polanc
8	14	12	March 13, 2015	June 5, 2015	Hans Sarpei & Kathrin Menzinger	Minh-Khai Phan-Thi & Massimo Sinató	Matthias Steiner & Ekaterina Leonova
9	14	12	March 11, 2016	June 3, 2016	Victoria Swarovski & Erich Klann	Sarah Lombardi & Robert Beitsch	Jana Pallaske & Massimo Sinató
10	14	13	February 24, 2017	June 9, 2017	Gil Ofarim & Ekaterina Leonova	Vanessa Mai & Christian Polanc	Angelina Kirsch & Massimo Sinató
11	14	13	March 9, 2018	June 8, 2018	Ingolf Lück & Ekaterina Leonova	Judith Williams & Erich Klann	Barbara Meier & Sergiu Luca
12	14	13	March 15, 2019	June 14, 2019	Pascal Hens & Ekaterina Leonova	Ella Endlich & Valentin Lusin	Benjamin Piwko & Isabel Edvardsson
13	14	13	February 21, 2020	May 22, 2020	Lili Paul-Roncalli & Massimo Sinató	Moritz Hans & Renata Lusin	Luca Hänni & Christina Luft
14	14	13	February 26, 2021	May 28, 2021	Rúrik Gíslason & Renata Lusin	Valentina Pahde & Valentin Lusin	Nicolas Puschmann & Vadim Garbuzov
15	14	13	February 18, 2022	May 20, 2022	René Casselly & Kathrin Menzinger	Janin Ullmann & Zsolt Sándor Cseke	Mathias Mester & Renata Lusin
16	14	13	February 17, 2023	May 19, 2023	Anna Ermakova & Valentin Lusin	Julia Beautx & Zsolt Sándor Cseke	Philipp Boy & Patricija Ionel
17	14	13	February 23, 2024	May 24, 2024	Gabriel Kelly & Malika Dzumaev	Jana Wosnitza & Vadim Garbuzov	Detlef Soost & Ekaterina Leonova
18	14	13	February 21, 2025	May 23, 2025	Diego Pooth & Ekaterina Leonova	Taliso Engel & Patricija Ionel	Fabian Hambüchen & Anastasia Mărușter
19	14	13	February 27, 2026	May 29, 2026	Anna-Carina Woitschack & Evgeny Vinokurov	Milano & Marta Arndt	Joel Mattli & Malika Dzumaev

== Specials ==
Only standalone programs or formats are listed as specials, and not those that are part of another program.

=== Christmas Specials ===
Year	Winning couple
2013	Magdalena Brzeska & Erich Klann
2022	Rúrik Gíslason & Malika Dzumaev
2023	Anna Ermakova & Valentin Lusin
2024	René Casselly & Kathrin Menzinger
2025	Diego Pooth & Ekaterina Leonova

==== Let's Dance – Let's Christmas ====
The show celebrated a special called Let's Dance – Let's Christmas with 5 celebrities from the past seasons on December 20, 2013, and on December 21, 2013. It was hosted by Daniel Hartwich & Sylvie Meis and the judging panel consisted of Jorge González, Motsi Mabuse and Joachim Llambi. With the prize money of 10,000 euros, Magdalena Brzeska, as the winner of the show, supported blind children in Togo in her function as project sponsor of RTL – Wir helfen Kindern.

Celebrity	Known for	Let's Dance history	Professional partner	Status
Manuel Cortez	Actor	season 6 winner	Oana Nechiti	Eliminated on December 20, 2013
Susan Sideropoulos	Actress	season 2 winner	Stefano Terrazzino	Eliminated on December 20, 2013
Moritz A. Sachs	Actor	season 4 runner-up	Isabel Edvardsson	Third place on December 21, 2013
Sophia Thomalla	Actress	season 3 winner	Massimo Sinató	Runner-up on December 21, 2013
Magdalena Brzeska	Gymnast	season 5 winner	Erich Klann	Winner on December 21, 2013

==== Let's Dance – Die große Weihnachtsshow ====
indicates the winning couple.

===== 2022 =====
On December 23, 2022, the special Let's Dance – Die große Weihnachtsshow (The big Christmas show) was broadcast. The jury consisted of Jorge González, Motsi Mabuse and Joachim Llambi. Up to 60 points per couple were awarded. Hosts were Victoria Swarovski and Daniel Hartwich. Participants were the winners of 2020 Lili Paul-Roncalli & Massimo Sinató, the winner of 2021 Rúrik Gíslason, who danced with Malika Dzumaev this time instead of Renata Lusin, the winners of 2022 René Casselly & Kathrin Menzinger, the runners-up of 2022 Janin Ullmann & Zsolt Sándor Cseke, and the third-place couple of 2022 Mathias Mester & Renata Lusin. All five couples presented two dances each. Although the show was taped on June 4, 2022, TV viewers were still able to vote live for their favorites as all five possible winning scenarios were pre-taped. The winners were Rúrik & Malika, who donated the prize money of 10,000 euros to the SOS Children's Villages in Africa.

Order	Couple	Let's Dance history	Dance	Music	Judge's Scores			Total	Grand Total
Order	Couple	Let's Dance history	Dance	Music	González	Mabuse	Llambi	Total	Grand Total
1	Lili & Massimo	season 13 winner	Cha-cha-cha	"Feliz Navidad" - José Feliciano	10	10	8	28	57
7	Lili & Massimo	season 13 winner	Foxtrot	"Oh Santa" - Kylie Minogue	10	10	9	29	57
2	Mathias & Renata	season 15 third place	Charleston	"In der Weihnachtsbäckerei" - Rolf Zuckowski	8	8	7	23	49
6	Mathias & Renata	season 15 third place	Jive	"Frosty the Snowman" - Gene Autry	9	9	8	26	49
3	René & Kathrin	season 15 winner	Quickstep	"Santa Claus Is Comin' to Town" - Frank Sinatra	10	10	8	28	58
10	René & Kathrin	season 15 winner	Tango	"Last Christmas" - Wham!	10	10	10	30	58
4	Janin & Zsolt	season 15 runner-up	Rumba	"Merry Christmas Darling" - The Carpenters	10	10	10	30	60
8	Janin & Zsolt	season 15 runner-up	Charleston	"Jingle Bells" - James Lord Pierpont	10	10	10	30	60
5	Rúrik & Malika	season 14 winner	Jive	"Incredible Christmas" - Gary Barlow	10	10	10	30	60
9	Rúrik & Malika	season 14 winner	Contemporary	"All I Want (For Christmas)" - Liam Payne	10	10	10	30	60

===== 2023 =====
On December 22, 2023, there was another Christmas show. The judges were Jorge González, Motsi Mabuse and Joachim Llambi, the hosts were Victoria Swarovski and Daniel Hartwich. Participants were the runners-up of 2012 Rebecca Mir & Massimo Sinató, the runner-up of 2016 Sarah Engels, who danced with Vadim Garbuzov this time instead of Robert Beitsch, the winners of 2018 Ingolf Lück & Ekaterina Leonova, the third-place couple of 2019 Benjamin Piwko & Isabel Edvardsson, the runners-up of 2020 Moritz Hans & Renata Lusin, and the winners of 2023 Anna Ermakova & Valentin Lusin. Although the show was taped on June 3, 2023, TV viewers were still able to vote live for their favorites as all six possible winning scenarios were pre-taped. The winners were Anna & Valentin, who donated the prize money of 10,000 euros to Ein Herz für Kinder.

Order	Couple	Let's Dance history	Dance	Music	Judge's Scores			Total	Grand Total
Order	Couple	Let's Dance history	Dance	Music	González	Mabuse	Llambi	Total	Grand Total
1	Rebecca & Massimo	season 5 runner-up	Salsa	"All I Want for Christmas Is You" - Mariah Carey	10	10	9	29	57
7	Rebecca & Massimo	season 5 runner-up	Tango	"A Christmas Tango (With Santa)" - L M Azpiazu	10	9	9	28	57
2	Moritz & Renata	season 13 runner-up	Charleston	"Rudolph the Red-Nosed Reindeer" - Gene Autry	10	10	9	29	56
8	Moritz & Renata	season 13 runner-up	Rumba	"White Christmas" - Bing Crosby	9	9	9	27	56
3	Sarah & Vadim	season 9 runner-up	Contemporary	"Happy Xmas (War Is Over)" - John Lennon	10	10	8	28	52
9	Sarah & Vadim	season 9 runner-up	Cha-cha-cha	"I Saw Mommy Kissing Santa Claus" - Tommie Connor	9	8	7	24	52
4	Anna & Valentin	season 16 winner	Rumba	"Santa Baby" - Eartha Kitt	10	10	10	30	60
10	Anna & Valentin	season 16 winner	Quickstep	"Merry Christmas Everyone" - Shakin' Stevens	10	10	10	30	60
5	Ingolf & Ekaterina	season 11 winner	Tango	"Never Do a Tango with an Eskimo" - Alma Cogan	9	9	8	26	49
11	Ingolf & Ekaterina	season 11 winner	Jive	"Sleigh Ride" - Leroy Anderson	8	8	7	23	49
6	Benjamin & Isabel	season 12 third place	Viennese waltz	"Snowman" - Sia	9	9	7	25	54
12	Benjamin & Isabel	season 12 third place	Contemporary	"Silent Night" - Boyce Avenue	10	10	9	29	54

===== 2024 =====
On December 20, 2024, there was the third Christmas show. The judges were Jorge González, Motsi Mabuse and Joachim Llambi, the hosts were Victoria Swarovski and Daniel Hartwich. Participants were the quarter-finalist of 2019 Evelyn Burdecki, who danced with Vadim Garbuzov this time instead of Evgeny Vinokurov, the winners of 2022 René Casselly & Kathrin Menzinger, the semi-finalist of 2022 Amira Aly, who danced with Valentin Lusin this time instead of Massimo Sinató, the runners-up of 2023 Julia Beautx & Zsolt Sándor Cseke, the winners of 2024 Gabriel Kelly & Malika Dzumaev, and Tony Bauer & Anastasia Mărușter, another couple of 2024. Although the show was taped on June 8, 2024, TV viewers were still able to vote live for their favorites as all six possible winning scenarios were pre-taped. The winners were René & Kathrin, who donated the prize money of 10,000 euros to the Big Life Foundation.

Order	Couple	Let's Dance history	Dance	Music	Judge's Scores			Total	Grand Total
Order	Couple	Let's Dance history	Dance	Music	González	Mabuse	Llambi	Total	Grand Total
1	Julia & Zsolt	season 16 runner-up	Quickstep	"Jingle Bells" - James Lord Pierpont	10	9	8	27	57
7	Julia & Zsolt	season 16 runner-up	Tango	"The Power of Love" - Frankie Goes to Hollywood	10	10	10	30	57
2	Evelyn & Vadim	season 12 quarter-finalist	Tango	"Do They Know It's Christmas?" - Band Aid	8	8	7	23	49
8	Evelyn & Vadim	season 12 quarter-finalist	Contemporary	"Underneath the Christmas Lights" - Sia	9	9	8	26	49
3	Tony & Anastasia	season 17 contestant	Waltz	"Drei Haselnüsse für Aschenbrödel" - Czech National Symphony Orchestra	9	8	7	24	50
9	Tony & Anastasia	season 17 contestant	Charleston	"Here Comes Santa Claus" - Gene Autry	9	9	8	26	50
4	Gabriel & Malika	season 17 winner	Viennese waltz	"The Christmas Song" - Nat King Cole	10	10	10	30	60
10	Gabriel & Malika	season 17 winner	Cha-cha-cha	"Last Christmas" - Wham!	10	10	10	30	60
5	Amira & Valentin	season 15 semi-finalist	Charleston	"Hurry Santa" - David Tobin	9	8	8	25	51
11	Amira & Valentin	season 15 semi-finalist	Rumba	"Driving Home for Christmas" - Chris Rea	9	9	8	26	51
6	René & Kathrin	season 15 winner	Jive	"All I Want for Christmas Is You" - Mariah Carey	10	10	10	30	60
12	René & Kathrin	season 15 winner	Contemporary	"Carol of the Bells" - Mykola Leontovych	10	10	10	30	60

===== 2025 =====
On December 19, 2025, there was the fourth Christmas show. The judges were Jorge González, Motsi Mabuse and Joachim Llambi, the hosts were Victoria Swarovski and Daniel Hartwich. Participants were the winners of 2006 Wayne Carpendale & Isabel Edvardsson, the runner-up of 2017 Vanessa Mai, who danced with Evgeny Vinokurov this time instead of Christian Polanc, the semi-finalist of 2019 Nazan Eckes, who danced with Valentin Lusin this time instead of Christian Polanc, the third-place couple of 2021 Nicolas Puschmann & Vadim Garbuzov, the winners of 2025 Diego Pooth & Ekaterina Leonova, and the semi-finalists of 2025 selfiesandra & Zsolt Sándor Cseke. Although the show was taped on June 7, 2025, TV viewers were still able to vote live for their favorites as all six possible winning scenarios were pre-taped. The winners were Diego & Ekaterina, who donated the prize money of 10,000 euros to the Kolibri Stiftung.

Order	Couple	Let's Dance history	Dance	Music	Judge's Scores			Total	Grand Total
Order	Couple	Let's Dance history	Dance	Music	González	Mabuse	Llambi	Total	Grand Total
1	Sandra & Zsolt	season 18 semi-finalist	Charleston	"Mele Kalikimaka" - Bing Crosby	10	9	7	26	49
7	Sandra & Zsolt	season 18 semi-finalist	Viennese waltz	"O Holy Night" - Mariah Carey	8	8	7	23	49
2	Nazan & Valentin	season 12 semi-finalist	Paso Doble	"Deck the Halls" - Nat King Cole	9	9	8	26	55
8	Nazan & Valentin	season 12 semi-finalist	Tango	"Feliz Navidad" - José Feliciano	10	10	9	29	55
3	Diego & Ekaterina	season 18 winner	Waltz	"Leise rieselt der Schnee" - Rondò Veneziano	10	9	8	27	57
9	Diego & Ekaterina	season 18 winner	Jive	"Underneath the Tree" - Kelly Clarkson	10	10	10	30	57
4	Wayne & Isabel	season 1 winner	Jive	"What Christmas Means to Me" - CeeLo Green	9	9	7	25	50
10	Wayne & Isabel	season 1 winner	Foxtrot	"Let It Snow" - Michael Bublé	9	9	7	25	50
5	Vanessa & Evgeny	season 10 runner-up	Cha-cha-cha	"Santa Baby" - Sheila E.	10	10	10	30	60
11	Vanessa & Evgeny	season 10 runner-up	Contemporary	"Where Are You Christmas?" - Faith Hill	10	10	10	30	60
6	Nicolas & Vadim	season 14 third place	Waltz	"I'll Be Home for Christmas" - Frank Sinatra	10	10	10	30	60
12	Nicolas & Vadim	season 14 third place	Charleston	"Merry Christmas allerseits" - Udo Jürgens	10	10	10	30	60

=== Let's Dance – Stepping Out ===
Let's Dance – Stepping Out was a spin-off of Let's Dance that aired on RTL in fall 2015. It was hosted by Daniel Hartwich & Sylvie Meis and the judging panel consisted of Jorge González, Motsi Mabuse and Joachim Llambi.

Unlike the original dance show, the contestants were all couples in real life, not one celebrity plus one professional dancer.

Celebrity	Known for	Coach	Status
Anna Hofbauer	Model & former Die Bachelorette star	Oliver Seefeldt	Winners on 16 October 2015
Marvin Albrecht	Contestant on Die Bachelorette	Oliver Seefeldt	Winners on 16 October 2015
Joelina Drews	Daughter of Jürgen Drews	Alla Bastert-Tkachenko	Runners-up on 16 October 2015
Marc Aurel Zeeb	Contestant on Deutschland sucht den Superstar	Alla Bastert-Tkachenko	Runners-up on 16 October 2015
Bruno Rauh	Contestant on Bauer sucht Frau	Timo Kulczak	Third place on 16 October 2015
Anja Rauh	Contestant on Bauer sucht Frau	Timo Kulczak	Third place on 16 October 2015
Mimi Fiedler	Tatort actress	Evgenij Voznyuk	Eliminated on 9 October 2015
Bernhard Bettermann	Actor	Evgenij Voznyuk	Eliminated on 9 October 2015
Felix von Jascheroff	Former Gute Zeiten, schlechte Zeiten actor	Maria Arces	Eliminated on 2 October 2015
Lisa Steiner	Girlfriend of Felix von Jascheroff	Maria Arces	Eliminated on 2 October 2015
Natascha Ochsenknecht	Actress	Nina Uszkureit	Eliminated on 11 September 2015 and on 25 September 2015
Umut Kekilli	Football player	Nina Uszkureit	Eliminated on 11 September 2015 and on 25 September 2015
Mario Basler	Former Football player	Marta Arndt	Withdrawn on 22 September 2015
Doris Büld	Fashion designer	Marta Arndt	Withdrawn on 22 September 2015
Björn Freitag	Chef	Oliver Thalheim	Eliminated on 18 September 2015
Anna Freitag	Model & former Miss Germany	Oliver Thalheim	Eliminated on 18 September 2015

=== Let's Dance – Die große Profi-Challenge ===
indicates the winning couple.
indicates the runner-up couple.
indicates the third-place couple.

Year
Year	Champions	Runners-up	Third place
2019	Ekaterina Leonova & Massimo Sinató	Kathrin Menzinger & Vadim Garbuzov	Renata Lusin & Valentin Lusin
2020	Christina Luft & Christian Polanc	Isabel Edvardsson & Marcus Weiß	Renata Lusin & Valentin Lusin
2021	Renata Lusin & Valentin Lusin	Kathrin Menzinger & Vadim Garbuzov	Christina Luft & Luca Hänni
2022	Renata Lusin & Christian Polanc	Kathrin Menzinger & Evgeny Vinokurov	Massimo Sinató & Vadim Garbuzov
2023	Malika Dzumaev & Zsolt Sándor Cseke	Kathrin Menzinger & Valentin Lusin	Andrzej Cibis & Vadim Garbuzov
2024	Massimo Sinató & Valentin Lusin	Anastasia Stan & Evgeny Vinokurov	Ekaterina Leonova & Paul Lorenz
2025	Ekaterina Leonova & Valentin Lusin	Evgeny Vinokurov & Mariia Maksina	Kathrin Menzinger & Christian Polanc
2026	Anastasia Mărușter & Vadim Garbuzov	Massimo Sinató & Isabel Edvardsson	Patricija Ionel & Evgeny Vinokurov

==== 2019 ====
On the show Let's Dance – Die große Profi-Challenge (The big professional challenge), only the professionals competed for the first time on June 27, 2019. The judges were Jorge González, Motsi Mabuse and Joachim Llambi, they commented but gave no points. The hosts were Daniel Hartwich and Victoria Swarovski. The show was pre-recorded on June 19, 2019. Because of that, a voting of the studio audience decided on the winners.

The solo dancers and some of the couples had other dancers on the floor. The professional challenge was won by Ekaterina Leonova & Massimo Sinató, Kathrin Menzinger & Vadim Garbuzov came second and Renata Lusin & Valentin Lusin came third. The winners were promised that one of them will be allowed to choose his or her own celebrity dance partner at Let's Dance 2020.

Running order

Order	Couple	Freestyle dance
1	Renata Lusin & Valentin Lusin	Tango & Foxtrot
2	Christina Luft	Aerial acrobatics & Freestyle
3	Regina Luca & Sergiu Luca	Hip Hop, Rhythmic gymnastics, Cha-cha-cha, Rumba & Jive
4	Ekaterina Leonova & Massimo Sinató	Argentine tango
5	Kathrin Menzinger & Vadim Garbuzov	Contemporary & Rumba
6	Robert Beitsch & Anastasia Bodnar	Cha-cha-cha, Charleston, Waacking, Breakdance, Samba & Salsa
7	Marta Arndt, Evgeny Vinokurov & Evgenij Voznyuk	Contemporary, Rumba & Paso Doble
8	Christian Polanc	Contemporary & Paso Doble
9	Katja Kalugina & Andrzej Cibis	Samba, Rumba & Commercial
10	Erich Klann & Oana Nechiti	Argentine tango & Contemporary

==== 2020 ====
In 2020, there was also a professional challenge, which was broadcast live on May 29, 2020. Due to the COVID-19 pandemic, this time it took place without a studio audience. Since then there has been a phone voting of the viewers at home to decide on the winners. The judges were again Jorge González, Motsi Mabuse and Joachim Llambi, they commented but gave no points. The hosts were again Daniel Hartwich and Victoria Swarovski.

Christina Luft & Christian Polanc won the second professional challenge and Isabel Edvardsson & Marcus Weiß were runners-up. As in the previous year, Renata Lusin & Valentin Lusin took third place. For Let's Dance 2021, one of the two winners will be allowed to choose his or her own partner among the celebrities.

Running order

Order	Couple	Freestyle dance
1	Marta Arndt & Robert Beitsch	Contemporary, Rumba & Samba
2	Kathrin Menzinger & Vadim Garbuzov	Argentine tango, Rumba, Paso Doble & Contemporary
3	Andrzej Cibis & Victoria Kleinfelder-Cibis	Rumba, Contemporary, Argentine tango & Paso Doble
4	Christina Luft & Christian Polanc	Paso Doble, Flamenco, Samba, Salsa, Argentine tango & Rumba
5	Alona Uehlin & Anton Skuratov	Foxtrot, Tango, Viennese waltz & Hip Hop
6	Evgeny Vinokurov & Nina Bezzubova	Rumba, Samba & Contemporary
7	Regina Luca & Sergiu Luca	Samba, African dance & Rumba
8	Renata Lusin & Valentin Lusin	Tango, Viennese waltz, Quickstep & Foxtrot
9	Erich Klann & Anne-Marie Kot	Contemporary & Pole dance
10	Isabel Edvardsson & Marcus Weiß	Rumba, American Smooth & Foxtrot

==== 2021 ====
In 2021, there was a professional challenge as well, which was broadcast live on June 4, 2021. The judges were again Jorge González, Motsi Mabuse and Joachim Llambi, they commented but gave no points. The hosts were again Daniel Hartwich and Victoria Swarovski. Due to a COVID-19 infection or COVID-19 contact, three originally planned couples, Alona Uehlin & Anton Skuratov, Malika Dzumaev & Zsolt Sándor Cseke and Regina Luca & Sergiu Luca, could not take part in the competition.

Renata Lusin & Valentin Lusin won the third professional challenge. As in the first professional challenge in 2019, Kathrin Menzinger & Vadim Garbuzov came second. As in season 13, Christina Luft & Luca Hänni took third place. For Let's Dance 2022, one of the two winners will be allowed to choose his or her own partner among the celebrities.

Running order

Order	Couple	Freestyle dance
1	Andrzej Cibis & Victoria Kleinfelder-Cibis	Contemporary, Freestyle & Jitterbug
2	Evgeny Vinokurov & Nina Bezzubova	Rumba & Contemporary
3	Marta Arndt & Christian Polanc	Paso Doble, Argentine tango, Slow Jive, Rumba & Contemporary
4	Robert Beitsch, Oxana Lebedew & Katharina Lebedew	Acrobatics, Rumba, Contemporary & Samba
5	Christina Luft & Luca Hänni	Viennese waltz, Contemporary & Freestyle
6	Patricija Belousova & Alexandru Ionel	Tango, Paso Doble & Foxtrot
7	Renata Lusin & Valentin Lusin	Tango, Waltz & Paso Doble
8	Kathrin Menzinger & Vadim Garbuzov	Rumba, Argentine tango, Contemporary, Samba & Paso Doble

==== 2022 ====
In 2022, there was another professional challenge, which was broadcast live on May 27, 2022. The judges were again Jorge González, Motsi Mabuse and Joachim Llambi, they commented but gave no points. The hosts were again Daniel Hartwich and Victoria Swarovski. For the first time, the professionals weren't allowed to choose their dance partners themselves, but rather the producers of the show put the couples together.

Renata Lusin & Christian Polanc won the fourth professional challenge. It was the second win in a professional challenge for both of them. Kathrin Menzinger & Evgeny Vinokurov came second and Massimo Sinató & Vadim Garbuzov took third place. For Let's Dance 2023, one of the two winners will be allowed to choose his or her own partner among the celebrities.

Running order

Order	Couple	Freestyle dance
1	Malika Dzumaev & Robert Beitsch	Cha-cha-cha, Samba & Jive
2	Patricija Ionel & Sergiu Luca	Viennese waltz
3	Christina Luft & Andrzej Cibis	Jive, Tango, Cha-cha-cha & Paso Doble
4	Ekaterina Leonova & Oxana Lebedew	Flamenco, Paso Doble & Tango
5	Alexandru Ionel & Anastasia Bodnar	Tango, Rumba, Paso Doble & Freestyle
6	Renata Lusin & Christian Polanc	Flamenco, Paso Doble, Contemporary, Rumba & Salsa
7	Isabel Edvardsson & Valentin Lusin	Foxtrot, Tango & Rumba
8	Massimo Sinató & Vadim Garbuzov	Contemporary, Ballet, Tango, Paso Doble & Viennese waltz
9	Zsolt Sándor Cseke & Marta Arndt	Rumba, Contemporary, Paso Doble & Samba
10	Kathrin Menzinger & Evgeny Vinokurov	Tango & Paso Doble

==== 2023 ====
In 2023, there was the fifth professional challenge, which was broadcast live on May 26, 2023. The judges were again Jorge González, Motsi Mabuse and Joachim Llambi, they commented but gave no points. The hosts were again Daniel Hartwich and Victoria Swarovski. For the first time, lots were used to determine who danced with whom. The winners were found by a new method. After all couples had danced their freestyle, there was an interim decision. The three teams with the most votes were allowed to compete against each other a second time in a "Dance Off". They danced one after the other to the same song - "Higher" by Michael Bublé. All votes from the first round were added to those from the second round.

Malika Dzumaev & Zsolt Sándor Cseke were announced as the winners. Kathrin Menzinger & Valentin Lusin came second and Andrzej Cibis & Vadim Garbuzov took third place. There was a new prize as well. For Let's Dance 2024, the winning couple will create the choreography for the professional opening of the launch show. Also, both of them get a bonus jury ranking point to use within the first four regular shows that can save them and their celebrity partners from elimination.

Running order

Order	Couple	Freestyle dance
1	Kathrin Menzinger & Valentin Lusin	Foxtrot, Tango, Quickstep, Tap dance & Jazz
2	Evgeny Vinokurov & Anna Salita	Cha-cha-cha & Rumba
3	Ekaterina Leonova & Alexandru Ionel	Tango, Paso Doble, Foxtrot, Rumba & Contemporary
4	Patricija Ionel & Christian Polanc	Contemporary & Ballroom styles
5	Malika Dzumaev & Zsolt Sándor Cseke	Paso Doble & Samba
6	Christina Luft & Isabel Edvardsson	Tango, Contemporary & Rumba
7	Marta Arndt & Artur Balandin	Rumba, Jive, Paso Doble & Freestyle
8	Andrzej Cibis & Vadim Garbuzov	Foxtrot, Cha-cha-cha, Paso Tango fusion
9	Mariia Maksina & Massimo Sinató	Paso Doble, Salsa, Flamenco, Samba & Freestyle

==== 2024 ====
In 2024, there was the sixth professional challenge, which was broadcast live on May 31, 2024. The judges were again Jorge González, Motsi Mabuse and Joachim Llambi, they commented but gave no points. The hosts were again Daniel Hartwich and Victoria Swarovski. For the second time, lots were used to determine who danced with whom. This time, there were three different rounds. First, all couples danced their freestyle as usual, then the "Quickdance Battle" took place for the first time, in which all couples danced one after the other to the same song - "Spicy Margarita" by Jason Derulo & Michael Bublé. An interim decision was then made. The three teams with the most votes were allowed to compete against each other a third time in a "Dance Off". Again they danced one after the other to the same song - "Can't Help Falling in Love [DARK VERSION]" by Tommee Profitt feat. brooke. All votes from the first two rounds were added to those from the third round.

Massimo Sinató & Valentin Lusin were announced as the winners. Anastasia Stan & Evgeny Vinokurov came second and Ekaterina Leonova & Paul Lorenz took third place. For Let's Dance 2025, the winning couple will create the choreography for the professional opening of the launch show. Also, both of them get a bonus jury ranking point to use within the first four regular shows that can save them and their celebrity partners from elimination.

Running order

Order	Couple	Freestyle dance
1	Mariia Maksina & Vadim Garbuzov	Foxtrot, Contemporary, Paso Doble, Viennese waltz & Samba
2	Malika Dzumaev & Fabian Täschner	Paso Doble, Contemporary, Samba & Jumpstyle
3	Ekaterina Leonova & Paul Lorenz	Tango, Foxtrot & Argentine tango
4	Anastasia Stan & Evgeny Vinokurov	Samba, Tango, Paso Doble, Rumba & Foxtrot
5	Marta Arndt & Zsolt Sándor Cseke	Jive, Samba & Salsa
6	Andrzej Cibis & Adeline Kastalion	Contemporary, Paso Doble, Tango, Rumba & Freestyle
7	Massimo Sinató & Valentin Lusin	Tango, Paso Doble, Contemporary & Freestyle
8	Kathrin Menzinger & Mika Tatarkin	Argentine tango, Samba, Rumba, Paso Doble & Tango
9	Patricija Ionel & Alexandru Ionel	Waltz, Tango, Foxtrot & Freestyle

==== 2025 ====
In 2025, there was the seventh professional challenge, which was broadcast live on May 30, 2025. The judges were again Jorge González, Motsi Mabuse and Joachim Llambi, they commented but gave no points. The hosts were again Daniel Hartwich and Victoria Swarovski. For the first time, the judges decided who danced with whom. For the second time, there were three different rounds. First, all couples danced their freestyle as usual, then the "Quickdance Battle" took place, in which all couples danced one after the other to the same song - "Bailar" by Deorro feat. Elvis Crespo. An interim decision was then made. The three teams with the most votes were allowed to compete against each other a third time in a "Dance Off". Again they danced one after the other to the same songs - "Codigo de Barra" by Bajofondo and "Sweet Dreams (Are Made of This)" by Eurythmics. All votes from the first two rounds were added to those from the third round.

Ekaterina Leonova & Valentin Lusin were announced as the winners. Evgeny Vinokurov & Mariia Maksina came second and Kathrin Menzinger & Christian Polanc took third place. For Let's Dance 2026, the winning couple will create the choreography for the professional opening of the launch show. Also, both of them get a bonus jury ranking point to use within the first four regular shows that can save them and their celebrity partners from elimination.

Running order

Order	Couple	Freestyle dance
1	Vadim Garbuzov & Katja Kalugina	Rumba, Contemporary, Samba & African moves
2	Anastasia Mărușter & Zsolt Sándor Cseke	Tango, Rumba, Samba & Paso Doble
3	Evgeny Vinokurov & Mariia Maksina	Rumba, Paso Doble, Viennese waltz, Tango, Foxtrot & Contemporary
4	Christina Hänni & Sergiu Mărușter	Cha-cha-cha, Samba, Paso Doble & Rumba
5	Kathrin Menzinger & Christian Polanc	Pas de deux, Viennese waltz & Tango
6	Renata Lusin & Alexandru Ionel	Charleston, Foxtrot, Samba & Slapstick
7	Ekaterina Leonova & Valentin Lusin	Freestyle
8	Isabel Edvardsson & Paul Lorenz	Tango & Foxtrot
9	Patricija Ionel & Mika Tatarkin	Freestyle

==== 2026 ====
In 2026, there was the eighth professional challenge, which was broadcast live on June 5, 2026. The judges were again Jorge González, Motsi Mabuse and Joachim Llambi, they commented but gave no points. The hosts were again Daniel Hartwich and Victoria Swarovski. For the second time, the judges decided who danced with whom, but this time they also dictated the dance style. For the third time, there were three different rounds. First, all couples danced their freestyle as usual, then the "Quickdance Battle" took place, in which all couples danced one after the other to the same song - "Azukita" by Steve Aoki, Daddy Yankee, Play-N-Skillz & Elvis Crespo. An interim decision was then made. The three teams with the most votes were allowed to compete against each other a third time in an "Instant Impro Dance". The first couple, Patricija & Evgeny, danced a fusion of Viennese waltz and Jive. The second couple, Massimo & Isabel, danced a fusion of Quickstep and Rumba. And the third couple, Anastasia & Vadim, danced a fusion of Foxtrot and Paso Doble. All votes from the first two rounds were added to those from the third round.

Anastasia Mărușter & Vadim Garbuzov were announced as the winners. Massimo Sinató & Isabel Edvardsson came second and Patricija Ionel & Evgeny Vinokurov took third place. For Let's Dance 2027, the winning couple will create the choreography for the professional opening of the launch show. Also, both of them get a bonus jury ranking point to use within the first four regular shows that can save them and their celebrity partners from elimination.

Running order

Order	Couple	Freestyle dance
1	Ekaterina Leonova & Mika Tatarkin	Quickstep
2	Malika Dzumaev & Sergiu Mărușter	Samba
3	Massimo Sinató & Isabel Edvardsson	Charleston
4	Vica Sauerwald & Valentin Lusin	Foxtrot
5	Anastasia Mărușter & Vadim Garbuzov	Tango
6	Mariia Maksina & Zsolt Sándor Cseke	Cha-cha-cha
7	Marta Arndt & Alexandru Ionel	Jive
8	Kathrin Menzinger & Paul Lorenz	Viennese waltz
9	Patricija Ionel & Evgeny Vinokurov	Rumba

=== Let's Dance – Llambis Tanzduell ===
In 2019 and 2020, RTL broadcast the spin-off show Let's Dance – Llambis Tanzduell (Llambi's dance duel). In each episode, Let's Dance judge Joachim Llambi sends two professional dancers or celebrities abroad, where they learn unknown local dances. They are supported by local dance trainers. Afterwards, both of them present their skills in front of spectators in national costume together with a local dance group and also solo. Back in Germany, the professional dancers meet Llambi again and review their experiences with the images. At the end of the dance, the local dance trainers and Llambi give it a grade between 1 and 10. The sum of both points awarded determines the winner of the duel.

The results of the duels were as follows:

Duel	Date	Location	Dance style	Winning contestant	1st points (dance trainers) + 2nd points (Joachim Llambi) = total points	Losing contestant	1st points (dance trainers) + 2nd points (Joachim Llambi) = total points
1	April 19, 2019	Hawaii	Hula	Christian Polanc	9 (live audience) + 8 = 17	Massimo Sinató	8 (live audience) + 7 = 15
2	April 19, 2020	Senegal	Sabar	Oana Nechiti	9.3 + 8 = 17.3	Kathrin Menzinger	6.5 + 8 = 14.5
3	April 26, 2020	Norway	Halling	Massimo Sinató	5.6 + 7 = 12.6	Christian Polanc	6.4 + 6 = 12.4
4	May 3, 2020	New Zealand	Haka	Pascal Hens	7.5 + 8 = 15.5	Ingolf Lück	6.5 + 7 = 13.5
5	May 10, 2020	Georgia	Kazbeguri	Erich Klann	10 + 9 = 19	Valentin Lusin	10 + 8 = 18
6	May 17, 2020	Peru	Scissors dance	Evgeny Vinokurov	8.6 + 8 = 16.6	Sergiu Luca	6.1 + 6 = 12.1
7	May 24, 2020	Ireland	Irish dance	Marta Arndt	8 + 6 = 14	Isabel Edvardsson	7 + 6 = 13

=== Let's Dance – Kids ===
In March 2021, RTL announced that it would broadcast Let's Dance – Kids on its own streaming platform TVNOW from April 9, 2021, for four episodes. As in the original version, Daniel Hartwich and Victoria Swarovski were the presenters. Also formed Joachim Llambi, Motsi Mabuse and Jorge Gonzalez the jury.

The show is based on the American version Dancing with the Stars: Juniors.

Celebrity	Notability (known for)	Professional partner	Coach	Status
Maris Ohneck	Erdoğan Atalay son	Jana Lebersky	Sergiu Luca	Eliminated 1st on May 16, 2021
Spencer König	Die Pfefferkörner actor	Selma Lohmann	Melissa Ortiz-Gomez	Eliminated 2nd on May 23, 2021
Zoé Baillieu	Gute Zeiten, schlechte Zeiten actress	Mischa Bakscheev	Regina Luca	Third place on May 30, 2021
Angelina Stecher-Williams	Judith Williams daughter	Erik Rettich	Victoria Kleinfelder-Cibis	Runner-up on June 6, 2021
Jona Szewczenko	Tanja Szewczenko daughter	Tizio Tiago Domingues da Silva	Roberto Albanese	Winner on June 6, 2021

=== Let's Dance – Die Live-Tour ===
Year	Couple with the most wins	Number of wins
2019	Benjamin Piwko & Isabel Edvardsson	10
2021	Rúrik Gíslason & Renata Lusin	6
2022	René Casselly & Kathrin Menzinger	18
2023	Julia Beautx & Zsolt Sándor Cseke	9
2024	René Casselly & Kathrin Menzinger	16
2025	Ella Endlich & Valentin Lusin	12

==== 2019 ====
Let's Dance – Die Live-Tour (The Live Tour) is a nationwide arena tour in Germany. Let's Dance went on tour in autumn 2019 for the first time. The judges were Jorge González, Motsi Mabuse and Joachim Llambi, they judged and gave points but only the audience in the arena decided on the winning couple every evening. The host was Daniel Hartwich. The group dances were choreographed by Massimo Sinató and Victoria Kleinfelder-Cibis. The tour began on 8 November in Riesa and finished on 29 November in Munich. In total there were 16 cities and 17 shows.

Participating couples and their dances were:

Celebrity	Let's Dance history	Professional partner	Dances	Number of wins
Rebecca Mir	season 5 runner-up	Massimo Sinató	Salsa and Tango (new)	4
Pascal Hens	season 12 winner	Renata Lusin	Salsa and Tango (Jury dance)	1
Benjamin Piwko	season 12 third place	Isabel Edvardsson	Rumba and Paso Doble	10
Evelyn Burdecki	season 12 quarter-finalist	Valentin Lusin	Jive and Salsa	0
Oliver Pocher	season 12 contestant	Christina Luft	Paso Doble and Charleston	1
Sabrina Mockenhaupt	season 12 contestant	Erich Klann	Tango and Waltz	1

Other participating professionals were:

- Andrzej Cibis
- Dimitri Boog
- Kathrin Menzinger
- Katja Kalugina
- Marta Arndt
- Robert Beitsch
- Vadim Garbuzov
- Victoria Kleinfelder-Cibis

The results of the tour were as follows:

Date	City	Winners
November 8, 2019	Riesa	Rebecca Mir & Massimo Sinató
November 9, 2019 ^{1}	Dortmund ^{1}	Benjamin Piwko & Isabel Edvardsson
November 10, 2019	Mannheim	Rebecca Mir & Massimo Sinató
November 13, 2019	Kiel	Pascal Hens & Renata Lusin
November 14, 2019	Düsseldorf	Benjamin Piwko & Isabel Edvardsson
November 15, 2019	Nuremberg	Benjamin Piwko & Isabel Edvardsson
November 16, 2019 ^{1}	Leipzig ^{1}	Benjamin Piwko & Isabel Edvardsson
November 18, 2019	Leipzig	Benjamin Piwko & Isabel Edvardsson
November 19, 2019	Braunschweig	Benjamin Piwko & Isabel Edvardsson
November 20, 2019	Berlin	Rebecca Mir & Massimo Sinató
November 21, 2019	Oberhausen	Rebecca Mir & Massimo Sinató
November 22, 2019	Bremen	Benjamin Piwko & Isabel Edvardsson
November 24, 2019	Hamburg	Benjamin Piwko & Isabel Edvardsson
November 26, 2019	Hanover	Oliver Pocher & Christina Luft
November 27, 2019	Frankfurt am Main	Benjamin Piwko & Isabel Edvardsson
November 28, 2019	Cologne	Sabrina Mockenhaupt & Erich Klann
November 29, 2019	Munich	Benjamin Piwko & Isabel Edvardsson

Annotation

- ^{1} On these dates, Oana Nechiti stood in as a judge for Motsi Mabuse.

==== 2021 ====
Let's Dance went on tour in autumn 2021 for the second time. The judges were Jorge González, Motsi Mabuse and Joachim Llambi again, they judged and gave points but only the audience in the arena decided on the winning couple every evening. The host was Daniel Hartwich. The group dances were choreographed by Vadim Garbuzov and Kathrin Menzinger. The tour began on 2 November in Riesa and finished on 28 November in Düsseldorf. In total there were 14 cities and 19 shows.

Participating couples and their dances were:

Celebrity	Let's Dance history	Professional partner	Dances	Number of wins
Lili Paul-Roncalli	season 13 winner	Andrzej Cibis	Tango and Freestyle (Magic Moment)	1
Moritz Hans	season 13 runner-up	Malika Dzumaev	Charleston and Rumba (Jury dance)	1
Luca Hänni	season 13 third place	Christina Luft	Cha-cha-cha and Rumba	5
Tijan Njie	season 13 semi-finalist	Kathrin Menzinger	Samba and Tango	1
Rúrik Gíslason	season 14 winner	Renata Lusin	Paso Doble and Jive	6
Valentina Pahde	season 14 runner-up	Valentin Lusin	Freestyle (Magic Moment) and Viennese waltz	1
Nicolas Puschmann	season 14 third place	Vadim Garbuzov	Waltz and Charleston	4

Other participating professionals were:

- Alexandru Ionel
- Evgeny Vinokurov
- Jesse Wijnans
- Marta Arndt
- Regina Luca
- Victoria Kleinfelder-Cibis
- Zsolt Sándor Cseke

The results of the tour were as follows:

Date	City	Winners
November 2, 2021	Riesa	Nicolas Puschmann & Vadim Garbuzov
November 3, 2021	Riesa	Valentina Pahde & Valentin Lusin
November 5, 2021	Hanover	Nicolas Puschmann & Vadim Garbuzov
November 6, 2021 ^{2}	Hamburg ^{2}	Nicolas Puschmann & Vadim Garbuzov
November 7, 2021	Oberhausen	Luca Hänni & Christina Luft
November 9, 2021	Leipzig	Moritz Hans & Malika Dzumaev
November 10, 2021	Leipzig	Rúrik Gíslason & Renata Lusin
November 12, 2021	Nuremberg	Luca Hänni & Christina Luft
November 13, 2021 ^{2}	Nuremberg ^{2}	Luca Hänni & Christina Luft
November 14, 2021	Dortmund	Rúrik Gíslason & Renata Lusin
November 16, 2021	Frankfurt am Main	Lili Paul-Roncalli & Andrzej Cibis
November 17, 2021	Frankfurt am Main	Tijan Njie & Kathrin Menzinger
November 18, 2021	Berlin	Luca Hänni & Christina Luft
November 19, 2021	Bremen	Rúrik Gíslason & Renata Lusin
November 20, 2021 ^{2}	Mannheim ^{2}	Rúrik Gíslason & Renata Lusin
November 22, 2021	Braunschweig	Rúrik Gíslason & Renata Lusin
November 23, 2021	Braunschweig	Luca Hänni & Christina Luft
November 27, 2021 ^{2}	Cologne ^{2}	Rúrik Gíslason & Renata Lusin
November 28, 2021	Düsseldorf	Nicolas Puschmann & Vadim Garbuzov

Annotation

- ^{2} On these dates, Isabel Edvardsson stood in as a judge for Motsi Mabuse.

==== 2022 ====
Let's Dance went on tour in autumn 2022 for the third time. The judges were Jorge González, Motsi Mabuse and Joachim Llambi again, they judged and gave points but only the audience in the arena decided on the winning couple every evening. The host was Daniel Hartwich. The group dances were choreographed by Vadim Garbuzov and Kathrin Menzinger. The tour began on 31 October in Riesa and finished on 27 November in Düsseldorf. In total there were 16 cities and 22 shows.

Participating couples and their dances were:

Celebrity	Let's Dance history	Professional partner	Dances	Number of wins
René Casselly	season 15 winner	Kathrin Menzinger	Tango and Freestyle (Final Freestyle)	18
Janin Ullmann	season 15 runner-up	Zsolt Sándor Cseke	Charleston and Rumba	2
Mathias Mester	season 15 third place	Renata Lusin	Paso Doble and Salsa	1
Sarah Mangione	season 15 quarter-finalist	Vadim Garbuzov	Foxtrot and Contemporary	1
Bastian Bielendorfer	season 15 contestant	Ekaterina Leonova	Cha-cha-cha and Tango	0
Mike Singer	season 15 contestant	Christina Luft	Contemporary and Quickstep	0
Timur Ülker	season 15 contestant	Malika Dzumaev	Jive and Tango	0

Other participating professionals were:

- Alexandru Ionel
- Andrzej Cibis
- Dimitar Stefanin
- Evgeny Vinokurov
- Jesse Wijnans
- Marta Arndt
- Patricija Ionel
- Regina Luca
- Valentin Lusin

The results of the tour were as follows:

Date	City	Winners
October 31, 2022	Riesa	René Casselly & Kathrin Menzinger
November 1, 2022	Riesa	René Casselly & Kathrin Menzinger
November 3, 2022	Berlin	René Casselly & Kathrin Menzinger
November 4, 2022	Oberhausen	René Casselly & Kathrin Menzinger
November 5, 2022 ^{3}	Dortmund ^{3}	René Casselly & Kathrin Menzinger
November 6, 2022	Cologne	René Casselly & Kathrin Menzinger
November 8, 2022	Leipzig	René Casselly & Kathrin Menzinger
November 9, 2022	Leipzig	René Casselly & Kathrin Menzinger
November 11, 2022	Munich	René Casselly & Kathrin Menzinger
November 12, 2022 ^{3}	Nuremberg ^{3}	René Casselly & Kathrin Menzinger
November 13, 2022	Nuremberg	René Casselly & Kathrin Menzinger
November 14, 2022	Mannheim	Janin Ullmann & Zsolt Sándor Cseke
November 16, 2022	Hamburg	René Casselly & Kathrin Menzinger
November 17, 2022	Hamburg	René Casselly & Kathrin Menzinger
November 18, 2022	Bremen	Janin Ullmann & Zsolt Sándor Cseke
November 19, 2022 ^{3}	Stuttgart ^{3}	René Casselly & Kathrin Menzinger
November 21, 2022	Frankfurt am Main	René Casselly & Kathrin Menzinger
November 22, 2022	Frankfurt am Main	René Casselly & Kathrin Menzinger
November 23, 2022	Braunschweig	Sarah Mangione & Vadim Garbuzov
November 24, 2022	Braunschweig	Mathias Mester & Renata Lusin
November 26, 2022 ^{3}	Hanover ^{3}	René Casselly & Kathrin Menzinger
November 27, 2022	Düsseldorf	René Casselly & Kathrin Menzinger

Annotation

- ^{3} On these dates, Isabel Edvardsson stood in as a judge for Motsi Mabuse.

==== 2023 ====
Let's Dance went on tour in autumn 2023 for the fourth time. The judges were Jorge González, Motsi Mabuse and Joachim Llambi again, they judged and gave points but only the audience in the arena decided on the winning couple every evening. The host was Daniel Hartwich. The group dances were choreographed by Vadim Garbuzov and Kathrin Menzinger. The tour began on 7 November in Riesa and finished on 4 December in Mannheim. In total there were 16 cities and 20 shows.

Participating couples and their dances were:

Celebrity	Let's Dance history	Professional partner	Dances	Number of wins	Number of 2nd places
Ingolf Lück	season 11 winner	Ekaterina Leonova	Rumba and Tango	0	1
Anna Ermakova	season 16 winner	Valentin Lusin	Tango and Contemporary	7	10
Julia Beautx	season 16 runner-up	Zsolt Sándor Cseke	Samba and Quickstep	9	5
Philipp Boy	season 16 third place	Patricija Ionel	Jive and Paso Doble	4	3
Mimi Kraus	season 16 contestant	Mariia Maksina	Waltz and Tango	0	0
Abdelkarim	season 16 contestant	Kathrin Menzinger	Charleston (Group dance) and Cha-cha-cha	0	1

Other participating professionals were:

- Alexandru Ionel
- Andrzej Cibis
- Christina Hänni
- Dimitar Stefanin
- Evgeny Vinokurov
- Jesse Wijnans
- Katja Kalugina
- Malika Dzumaev
- Marta Arndt
- Vadim Garbuzov

The results of the tour were as follows:

Date	City	Winners	Runners-up
November 7, 2023	Riesa	Julia Beautx & Zsolt Sándor Cseke	Anna Ermakova & Valentin Lusin
November 9, 2023	Leipzig	Julia Beautx & Zsolt Sándor Cseke	Anna Ermakova & Valentin Lusin
November 10, 2023	Leipzig	Anna Ermakova & Valentin Lusin	Philipp Boy & Patricija Ionel
November 11, 2023 ^{4}	Munich ^{4}	Anna Ermakova & Valentin Lusin	Abdelkarim & Kathrin Menzinger
November 12, 2023	Munich	Julia Beautx & Zsolt Sándor Cseke	Anna Ermakova & Valentin Lusin
November 14, 2023	Nuremberg	Anna Ermakova & Valentin Lusin	Philipp Boy & Patricija Ionel
November 16, 2023	Berlin	Philipp Boy & Patricija Ionel	Julia Beautx & Zsolt Sándor Cseke
November 17, 2023	Bremen	Julia Beautx & Zsolt Sándor Cseke	Anna Ermakova & Valentin Lusin
November 18, 2023 ^{4}	Hamburg ^{4}	Anna Ermakova & Valentin Lusin	Philipp Boy & Patricija Ionel
November 21, 2023	Braunschweig	Julia Beautx & Zsolt Sándor Cseke	Anna Ermakova & Valentin Lusin
November 23, 2023	Frankfurt am Main	Julia Beautx & Zsolt Sándor Cseke	Anna Ermakova & Valentin Lusin
November 24, 2023	Frankfurt am Main	Julia Beautx & Zsolt Sándor Cseke	Anna Ermakova & Valentin Lusin
November 25, 2023 ^{4}	Stuttgart ^{4}	Philipp Boy & Patricija Ionel	Anna Ermakova & Valentin Lusin
November 27, 2023	Stuttgart	Philipp Boy & Patricija Ionel	Julia Beautx & Zsolt Sándor Cseke
November 28, 2023	Düsseldorf	Anna Ermakova & Valentin Lusin	Julia Beautx & Zsolt Sándor Cseke
November 29, 2023	Dortmund	Anna Ermakova & Valentin Lusin	Ingolf Lück & Ekaterina Leonova
December 1, 2023	Hanover	Anna Ermakova & Valentin Lusin	Julia Beautx & Zsolt Sándor Cseke
December 2, 2023 ^{4}	Oberhausen ^{4}	Philipp Boy & Patricija Ionel	Julia Beautx & Zsolt Sándor Cseke
December 3, 2023	Cologne	Julia Beautx & Zsolt Sándor Cseke	Anna Ermakova & Valentin Lusin
December 4, 2023	Mannheim	Julia Beautx & Zsolt Sándor Cseke	Anna Ermakova & Valentin Lusin

Annotation

- ^{4} On these dates, Isabel Edvardsson stood in as a judge for Motsi Mabuse.

==== 2024 ====
Let's Dance went on tour in autumn 2024 for the fifth time. The judges were Jorge González, Motsi Mabuse and Joachim Llambi again, they judged and gave points but only the audience in the arena decided on the winning couple every evening. The host was Daniel Hartwich. The group dances were choreographed by Vadim Garbuzov and Kathrin Menzinger. The tour began on 29 October in Riesa and finished on 28 November in Zurich. In total there were 17 cities and 23 shows.

Participating couples and their dances were:

Celebrity	Let's Dance history	Professional partner	Dances	Number of wins	Number of 2nd places
René Casselly	season 15 winner	Kathrin Menzinger	Freestyle (new) and Jive	16	5
Sharon Battiste	season 16 contestant	Valentin Lusin	Cha-cha-cha and Rumba (Partner Switch)	0	0
Gabriel Kelly	season 17 winner	Malika Dzumaev	Tango and Samba (Jury dance)	5	17
Jana Wosnitza	season 17 runner-up	Vadim Garbuzov	Viennese waltz and Paso Doble	2	0
Detlef Soost	season 17 third place	Ekaterina Leonova	Samba and Tango (Trio dance with Mariia Maksina)	0	0
Lina Larissa Strahl	season 17 contestant	Zsolt Sándor Cseke	Quickstep and Cha-cha-cha	0	1

Other participating professionals were:

- Alexandru Ionel
- Anastasia Mărușter
- Evgeny Vinokurov
- Katja Kalugina
- Mariia Maksina
- Marta Arndt
- Mika Tatarkin
- Paul Lorenz
- Renata Lusin
- Sergiu Mărușter

The results of the tour were as follows:

Date	City	Winners	Runners-up
October 29, 2024	Riesa	René Casselly & Kathrin Menzinger	Gabriel Kelly & Malika Dzumaev
October 31, 2024	Leipzig	René Casselly & Kathrin Menzinger	Lina Larissa Strahl & Zsolt Sándor Cseke
November 1, 2024	Leipzig	René Casselly & Kathrin Menzinger	Gabriel Kelly & Malika Dzumaev
November 2, 2024 ^{5}	Munich ^{5}	René Casselly & Kathrin Menzinger	Gabriel Kelly & Malika Dzumaev
November 3, 2024	Munich	René Casselly & Kathrin Menzinger	Gabriel Kelly & Malika Dzumaev
November 5, 2024	Mannheim	René Casselly & Kathrin Menzinger	Gabriel Kelly & Malika Dzumaev
November 6, 2024	Oberhausen	René Casselly & Kathrin Menzinger	Gabriel Kelly & Malika Dzumaev
November 8, 2024	Hamburg	René Casselly & Kathrin Menzinger	Gabriel Kelly & Malika Dzumaev
November 9, 2024 ^{5}	Hamburg ^{5}	Gabriel Kelly & Malika Dzumaev	René Casselly & Kathrin Menzinger
November 10, 2024	Berlin	René Casselly & Kathrin Menzinger	Gabriel Kelly & Malika Dzumaev
November 12, 2024	Nuremberg	Gabriel Kelly & Malika Dzumaev	René Casselly & Kathrin Menzinger
November 13, 2024	Cologne	René Casselly & Kathrin Menzinger	Gabriel Kelly & Malika Dzumaev
November 14, 2024	Bremen	Gabriel Kelly & Malika Dzumaev	René Casselly & Kathrin Menzinger
November 15, 2024	Hanover	René Casselly & Kathrin Menzinger	Gabriel Kelly & Malika Dzumaev
November 16, 2024 ^{5}	Hanover ^{5}	René Casselly & Kathrin Menzinger	Gabriel Kelly & Malika Dzumaev
November 18, 2024	Braunschweig	René Casselly & Kathrin Menzinger	Gabriel Kelly & Malika Dzumaev
November 20, 2024	Frankfurt am Main	René Casselly & Kathrin Menzinger	Gabriel Kelly & Malika Dzumaev
November 21, 2024	Frankfurt am Main	René Casselly & Kathrin Menzinger	Gabriel Kelly & Malika Dzumaev
November 22, 2024	Stuttgart	René Casselly & Kathrin Menzinger	Gabriel Kelly & Malika Dzumaev
November 23, 2024 ^{5}	Stuttgart ^{5}	Jana Wosnitza & Vadim Garbuzov	Gabriel Kelly & Malika Dzumaev
November 25, 2024	Dortmund	Gabriel Kelly & Malika Dzumaev	René Casselly & Kathrin Menzinger
November 26, 2024	Düsseldorf	Jana Wosnitza & Vadim Garbuzov	Gabriel Kelly & Malika Dzumaev
November 28, 2024	Zurich	Gabriel Kelly & Malika Dzumaev	René Casselly & Kathrin Menzinger

Annotation

- ^{5} On these dates, Isabel Edvardsson stood in as a judge for Motsi Mabuse.

==== 2025 ====
Let's Dance went on tour in autumn 2025 for the sixth time. The judges were Jorge González, Motsi Mabuse and Joachim Llambi again, they judged and gave points but only the audience in the arena decided on the winning couple every evening. The host was Daniel Hartwich. The group dances were choreographed by Vadim Garbuzov and Kathrin Menzinger. The tour began on 1 November in Riesa and finished on 4 December in Mannheim. In total there were 18 cities and 25 shows.

Participating couples and their dances were:

Celebrity	Let's Dance history	Professional partner	Dances	Number of wins	Number of 2nd places
Ella Endlich	season 12 runner-up	Valentin Lusin	Samba and Rumba (Trio dance with Malika Dzumaev)	12	4
Ann-Kathrin Bendixen	season 17 semi-finalist	Zsolt Sándor Cseke	Contemporary and Quickstep	2	3
Mark Keller	season 17 contestant	Kathrin Menzinger	Charleston and Freestyle (Magic Moment)	1	0
Diego Pooth	season 18 winner	Ekaterina Leonova	Waltz and Cha-cha-cha (Jury dance)	2	8
Taliso Engel	season 18 runner-up	Patricija Ionel	Viennese waltz and Contemporary	6	7
Fabian Hambüchen	season 18 third place	Anastasia Mărușter	Tango and Freestyle (Magic Moment)	2	3
Marie Mouroum	season 18 quarter-finalist	Alexandru Ionel	Samba and Foxtrot	0	0

Other participating professionals were:

- Evgeny Vinokurov
- Katja Graf
- Malika Dzumaev
- Mariia Maksina
- Marta Arndt
- Mika Tatarkin
- Paul Lorenz
- Sergiu Mărușter
- Vadim Garbuzov

The results of the tour were as follows:

Date	City	Winners	Runners-up
November 1, 2025 ^{6}	Riesa ^{6}	Ella Endlich & Valentin Lusin	Diego Pooth & Ekaterina Leonova
November 2, 2025	Riesa	Ella Endlich & Valentin Lusin	Diego Pooth & Ekaterina Leonova
November 4, 2025	Leipzig	Taliso Engel & Patricija Ionel	Diego Pooth & Ekaterina Leonova
November 5, 2025	Leipzig	Ella Endlich & Valentin Lusin	Fabian Hambüchen & Anastasia Mărușter
November 7, 2025	Berlin	Ella Endlich & Valentin Lusin	Taliso Engel & Patricija Ionel
November 8, 2025 ^{6}	Hamburg ^{6}	Ella Endlich & Valentin Lusin	Taliso Engel & Patricija Ionel
November 9, 2025	Hamburg	Taliso Engel & Patricija Ionel	Ann-Kathrin Bendixen & Zsolt Sándor Cseke
November 11, 2025	Nuremberg	Taliso Engel & Patricija Ionel	Diego Pooth & Ekaterina Leonova
November 13, 2025	Dortmund	Ella Endlich & Valentin Lusin	Diego Pooth & Ekaterina Leonova
November 14, 2025	Oberhausen	Ella Endlich & Valentin Lusin	Taliso Engel & Patricija Ionel
November 15, 2025 ^{6}	Düsseldorf ^{6}	Diego Pooth & Ekaterina Leonova	Ella Endlich & Valentin Lusin
November 17, 2025	Frankfurt am Main	Taliso Engel & Patricija Ionel	Fabian Hambüchen & Anastasia Mărușter
November 18, 2025	Frankfurt am Main	Ella Endlich & Valentin Lusin	Fabian Hambüchen & Anastasia Mărușter
November 19, 2025	Bremen	Ella Endlich & Valentin Lusin	Diego Pooth & Ekaterina Leonova
November 21, 2025	Munich	Diego Pooth & Ekaterina Leonova	Ann-Kathrin Bendixen & Zsolt Sándor Cseke
November 22, 2025 ^{6}	Munich ^{6}	Taliso Engel & Patricija Ionel	Ella Endlich & Valentin Lusin
November 24, 2025	Braunschweig	Ann-Kathrin Bendixen & Zsolt Sándor Cseke	Ella Endlich & Valentin Lusin
November 25, 2025	Hanover	Ella Endlich & Valentin Lusin	Diego Pooth & Ekaterina Leonova
November 26, 2025	Cologne	Ella Endlich & Valentin Lusin	Taliso Engel & Patricija Ionel
November 28, 2025	Erfurt	Mark Keller & Kathrin Menzinger	Diego Pooth & Ekaterina Leonova
November 29, 2025 ^{6}	Stuttgart ^{6}	Fabian Hambüchen & Anastasia Mărușter	Taliso Engel & Patricija Ionel
November 30, 2025	Stuttgart	Fabian Hambüchen & Anastasia Mărușter	Ann-Kathrin Bendixen & Zsolt Sándor Cseke
December 2, 2025	Zurich	Taliso Engel & Patricija Ionel	Ella Endlich & Valentin Lusin
December 3, 2025 ^{6}	Zurich ^{6}	Ella Endlich & Valentin Lusin	Taliso Engel & Patricija Ionel
December 4, 2025	Mannheim	Ann-Kathrin Bendixen & Zsolt Sándor Cseke	Taliso Engel & Patricija Ionel

Annotation

- ^{6} On these dates, Isabel Edvardsson stood in as a judge for Motsi Mabuse.
