= Let's Dance (German TV series) season 1 =

Let's Dance
- Season 1
- Hosted by: Nazan Eckes; Hape Kerkeling
- Judges: Michael Hull; Joachim Llambi; Markus Schöffl; Katarina Witt
- Celebrity winner: Wayne Carpendale
- Professional winner: Isabel Edvardsson
- No. of episodes: 8

Release
- Original network: RTL Television
- Original release: April 3 – May 21, 2006

Season chronology
- Next → Season 2

The first season of Let's Dance debuted on RTL Television on 3 April 2006. Eight celebrities were paired with eight professional ballroom dancers. Nazan Eckes and Hape Kerkeling were the hosts, while Michael Hull, Joachim Llambi, Markus Schöffl, and Katarina Witt were the judges.

On 21 May 2006, actor Wayne Carpendale and Isabel Edvardsson were announced as the winners, while actress Wolke Hegenbarth and Oliver Seefeldt finished in second place.

== Couples ==
This season featured eight celebrity contestants.

Celebrity	Notability	Professional partner	Status
Axel Bulthaupt	Television host	Anna Karina Mosmann	Eliminated 1st on April 10, 2006
Heike Henkel	Olympic high jumper	Dirk Bastert	Eliminated 2nd on April 17, 2006
Jochen Horst	Actor	Sofia Bogdanova	Eliminated 3rd on April 24, 2006
Jürgen Hingsen	Olympic decathlete	Uta Deharde	Eliminated 4th on May 1, 2006
Heide Simonis	Politician	Hendrik Höfken	Withdrew on May 8, 2006
Sandy Mölling	Singer	Roberto Albanese	Eliminated 6th on May 15, 2006
Wolke Hegenbarth	Actress	Oliver Seefeldt	Runners-up on May 21, 2006
Wayne Carpendale	Actor	Isabel Edvardsson	Winners on May 21, 2006

== Scoring chart ==
The highest score each week is indicated in bold green with a dagger (†), while the lowest score each week is indicated in italicized red with a double-dagger (‡).

Color key:

Winners
Runners-up
Withdrew from competition
Eliminated

Let's Dance (season 1) - Weekly scores
Couple	Pl.	Week							
Couple	Pl.	1	2	3	4	5	6	7	8
Wayne & Isabel	1st	24	**29**†	**31**†	30	32	30+34=64	30+30=60‡	36+36=72‡ (Note: This couple finished in first place.)
Wolke & Oliver	2nd	27	**29**†	29	34	33	33+32=**65**†	32+35=**67**†	37+39=**76**† (Note: This couple finished in second place.)
Sandy & Roberto	3rd	27	28	21	**38**†	**34**†	27+34=61‡	31+36=**67**† (Note: This couple was eliminated.)	
Heide & Hendrik	4th	15‡	17	15‡	14‡	14‡	(Note: This couple withdrew from the competition.)		
Jürgen & Uta	5th	23	16‡	23	23	25			
Jochen & Sofia	6th	23	24	20	21				
Heike & Dirk	7th	**28**†	24	21					
Axel & Anna	8th	20	21						

== Weekly scores ==
Individual judges scores in charts below (given in parentheses) are listed in this order from left to right: Michael Hull, Katarina Witt, Markus Schöffl, Joachim Llambi.

=== Week 1 ===
Each couple performed either the cha-cha-cha or the waltz. Couples are listed in the order they performed.

Couple	Scores	Dance	Music
Wolke & Oliver	27 (6, 8, 7, 6)	Cha-cha-cha	"Think" — Aretha Franklin
Axel & Anna	20 (5, 5, 5, 5)	Waltz	"You Light Up My Life" — Kasey Cisyk
Jürgen & Uta	23 (7, 7, 6, 3)	Cha-cha-cha	"I'm Outta Love" — Anastacia
Sandy & Roberto	27 (7, 7, 7, 6)	Waltz	"Moon River" — Audrey Hepburn
Jochen & Sofia	23 (8, 5, 5, 5)	Cha-cha-cha	"Uptown Girl" — Billy Joel
Heike & Dirk	28 (8, 7, 7, 6)	Waltz	"If You Don't Know Me by Now" — Simply Red
Wayne & Isabel	24 (5, 7, 6, 6)	Cha-cha-cha	"Hung Up" — Madonna
Heide & Hendrik	15 (2, 6, 4, 3)	Waltz	"Three Times a Lady" — The Commodores

=== Week 2 ===
Each couple performed either the quickstep or the rumba. Couples are listed in the order they performed.

Couple	Scores	Dance	Music
Sandy & Roberto	28 (8, 7, 7, 6)	Rumba	"Mandy" — Barry Manilow
Jochen & Sofia	24 (6, 7, 6, 5)	Quickstep	"Puttin' On the Ritz" — Harry Richman
Heide & Hendrik	17 (3, 5, 5, 4)	Rumba	"Somethin' Stupid" — Frank & Nancy Sinatra
Wayne & Isabel	29 (8, 8, 7, 6)	Quickstep	"Gekommen, um zu bleiben" — Wir sind Helden
Heike & Dirk	24 (7, 7, 6, 4)	Rumba	"Your Song" — Elton John
Jürgen & Uta	16 (2, 6, 5, 3)	Quickstep	"Part-Time Lover" — Stevie Wonder
Axel & Anna	21 (5, 5, 6, 5)	Rumba	"Too Lost in You" — Sugababes
Wolke & Oliver	29 (7, 9, 7, 6)	Quickstep	"Diamonds Are a Girl's Best Friend" — Carol Channing

== Dance chart ==
The couples performed the following each week:

- Week 1: One unlearned dance (cha-cha-cha or waltz)
- Week 2: One unlearned dance (quickstep or rumba)
- Week 3: One unlearned dance (jive or tango)
- Week 4: One unlearned dance (foxtrot or paso doble)
- Week 5: Samba & Viennese waltz group dance
- Week 6: Two unlearned dances
- Week 7: Two unlearned dances
- Week 8 (Finals): Favorite Latin dance, favorite ballroom dance, Viennese waltz & freestyle

Let's Dance (season 1) - Dance chart
Couple	Week													
Couple	1	2	3	4	5		6		7		8			
Wayne & Isabel	Cha-cha-cha	Quickstep	Jive	Foxtrot	Samba	Group; Viennese waltz	Waltz	Rumba	Tango	Paso doble	Quickstep	Jive	Viennese waltz	Freestyle
Wolke & Oliver	Cha-cha-cha	Quickstep	Jive	Foxtrot	Samba	Group; Viennese waltz	Waltz	Rumba	Tango	Paso doble	Foxtrot	Samba	Viennese waltz	Freestyle
Sandy & Roberto	Waltz	Rumba	Tango	Paso doble	Samba	Group; Viennese waltz	Quickstep	Cha-cha-cha	Foxtrot	Jive				
Heide & Hendrik	Waltz	Rumba	Tango	Paso doble	Samba	Group; Viennese waltz								
Jürgen & Uta	Cha-cha-cha	Quickstep	Jive	Foxtrot	Samba	Group; Viennese waltz								
Jochen & Sofia	Cha-cha-cha	Quickstep	Jive	Foxtrot										
Heike & Dirk	Waltz	Rumba	Tango											
Axel & Anna	Waltz	Rumba												
