= René Casselly =

German Circus Performer (born 1996)

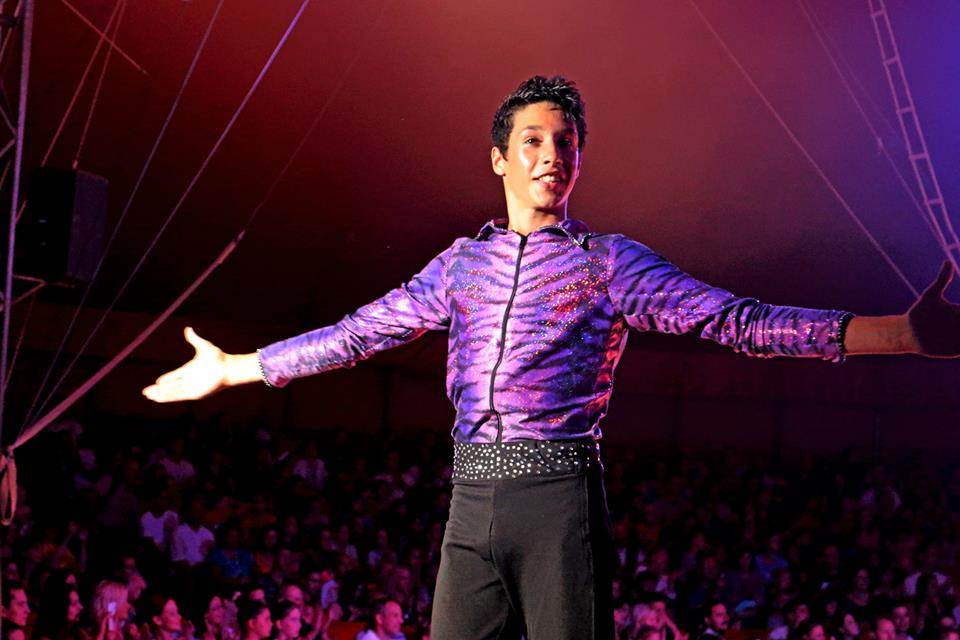
- Casselly in Hungarian National Circus 2014
- Born: René Kaselowsky; 6 September 1996 (age 29); Germany
- Occupations: Circus performer, businessman, TV personality
- Years active: 2002–present
- Known for: Founder and CEO of Kimba Elephant Park
- Relatives: Casselly Family
- Website: https://www.instagram.com/rene_casselly/

René Casselly Jr (born 6 September 1996 as René Kaselowsky) is a circus performer known for appearing on shows like Ninja Warrior Germany and Series 15 of Let's Dance, which he won.

== Early life ==
René was born into the Casselly circus family. He grew up in a trailer park because his family toured with the circus. He has been around elephants since being a toddler.

== Career ==
=== Circus ===
In 2022, Casselly joined the lineup of the World Christmas Circus in Stuttgart, and in 2023 he performed at the International Circus Festival of Monte-Carlo with Merrylu Casselly and Quincy Azzario and was awarded the Clown d'or (Golden Clown) award.

=== Ninja Warrior ===
René competed in the German, Japanese and French Ninja Warrior shows. In 2021, he became Germany's first ninja warrior to complete the last obstacle, the famous Mount Midoriyama. However, in 2022, he was eliminated in the first stage of the final and was unable to defend his title. In 2025, he beat Mount Midoriyama in France.

=== Let's Dance ===
In the spring of 2022, René took part in Let's Dance season 15 and was paired up with Kathrin Menzinger. The pair ended up winning the series.

== Filmography ==
Year	Title	Role	Ref.
2017	Ninja Warrior Germany	Participant; 2nd Place	
2018	Ninja Warrior Germany	Participant; 5th place	
2018	Team Ninja Warrior	Contestant; part of winning team	
2018	Ninja Warrior Germany: 4 Nations Special	Contestant; part of winning team (TeamGermany)	
2019	Ninja Warrior Germany	Participant; 9th place	
2019	Team Ninja Warrior	Participant; part of winning team	
2019	Ninja Warrior Germany: 4 Nations Special	Contestant; 2nd Place (TeamGermany)	
2020	Ninja Warrior Germany	Participant; 3rd Place	
2021	Ninja Warrior Germany All-Stars	Participant; 2nd Qualifying Round	
2021	Ninja Warrior Germany	Participant; Winner	
2022	Let's Dance (German season 15)	Contestant; Winner (with Kathrin Menzinger)	
2022	Ninja Warrior Germany All-Stars	Participant; Round 1 of Final	
2022	Klein Gegen GroB	Contestant; Winner of his duel	
2022	Ninja Warrior Germany	Participant; 11th Place	
2022	Let's Dance (German TV series) Christmas Special	Participant; 2nd Place	
2022	Unvergessen: Die Geheimnisse hinter den Kultigsten RTL-Momenten	Himself, alongside his cousin Ramon Roselly	
2023	Die große GEO Show - In 55 Fragen um die Welt	Participant; Eliminated 1st	

== Trivia ==
His cousin is schlager singer Ramon Roselly, the winner of Deutschland sucht den Superstar (season 17)
