= Renata Lusin =

Russian dancer and trainer (born 1987)

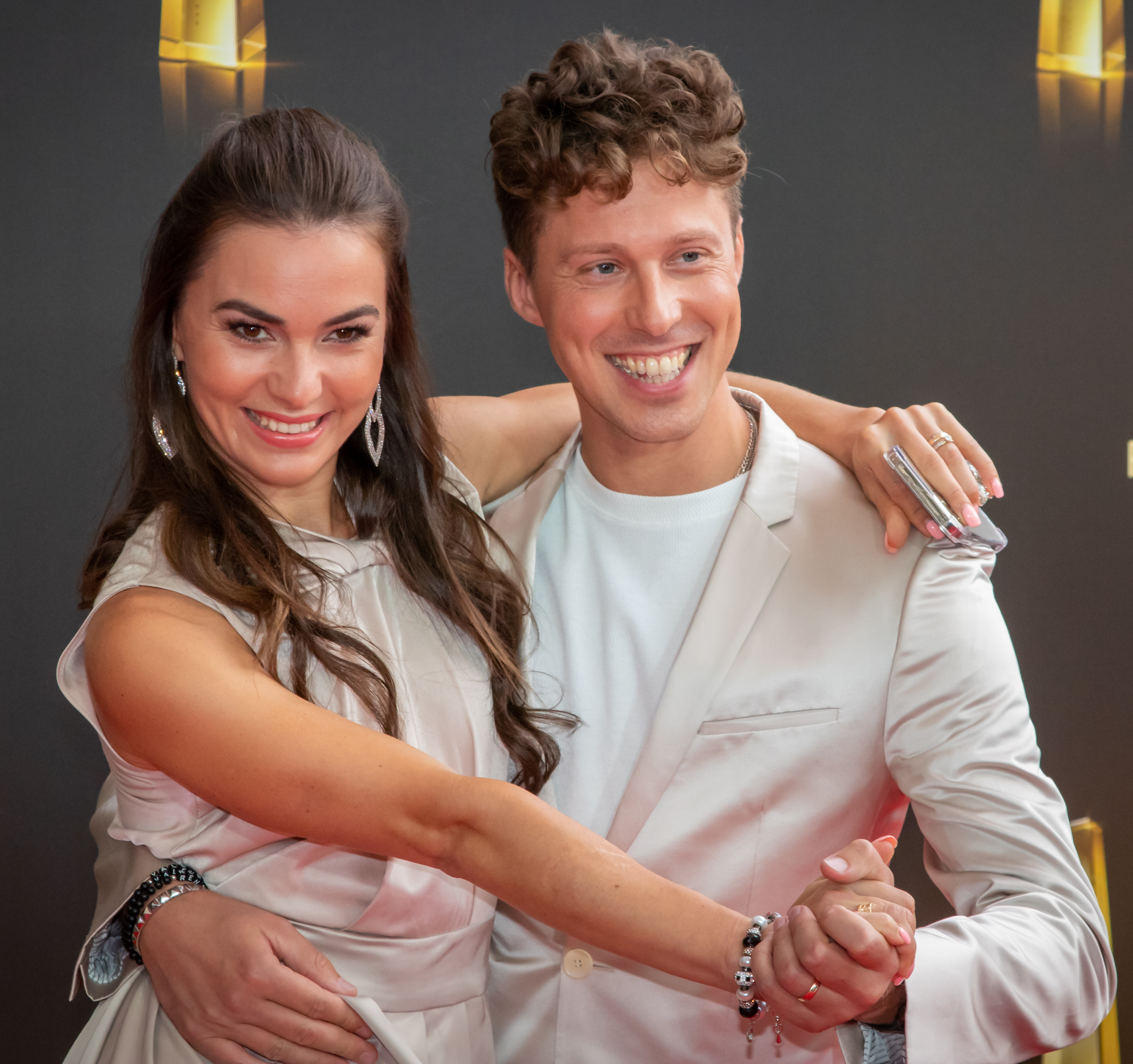
- Renata Lusin with Valentin Lusin (2021)
- Born: Renata Busheyeva; 16 June 1987 (age 38); Kasan, Tatar ASSR, Soviet Union
- Occupations: dancer and dance sports trainer

Renata Lusin (born 16 June 1987 in Kazan, Tatar ASSR, Soviet Union) is a Russian dancer and dance sports trainer.

== Life and career ==
Renata Busheyeva was born on 16 June 1987 in Kazan, Tatar ASSR, Soviet Union. Her mother is Tatar and her father is Ukrainian. Lusin started dancing when she was 11 years old. At the age of 13, she moved with her grandfather from Kazan to Moscow to pursue professional training. She danced with Valentin Rechetnikov for a few months in 2002, with Evgeni Grigorov in early 2003 and with Ivan Anichkhin later. When she was 16, her mother advertised for a dance partner for her. The parents of Valentin Lusin from Düsseldorf came across the advertisement and Renata Lusin moved to Germany to partner Valentin.

Since 2003, she has been dancing with Valentin Lusin in the TD Tanzsportclub Düsseldorf Rot-Weiss. From 2006, she studied business administration at the Heinrich Heine University of Düsseldorf. In May 2014, Renata and Valentin Lusin married and they live in Düsseldorf.

The couple became multiple national champions in the main group S-standard and S-Latin and won various ranking tournaments. They also won the German Ten Dances championship twice and took top places in national and international championships. They belonged to the federal A squad and took first place in the ranking list of the main group standard of the German Dance Sports Association (most recently on 28 February 2017). In autumn 2017, the couple switched to the professional dancing as a part of the German Dance Sports Association. After winning the title at the World Championships Showdance Standard of Professionals in October 2021, the couple announced the end of their active dance career. Renata Lusin works as a trainer at the TD Tanzsportclub Düsseldorf Rot-Weiss, at the Meerbuscher Tanzsport-Club and at TTC Schwarz-Gold Moers.

=== Let’s Dance ===
In 2018, Lusin took part in the RTL dance show Let's Dance for the first time. Her dance partner Jimi Blue Ochsenknecht had to give up in the fifth episode due to injury. A year later she and Jan Hartmann were the first couple to be eliminated. In 2020 and 2022, she reached second and third place in the final with Moritz Hans and Mathias Mester, and in 2021 she achieved victory with Rúrik Gíslason. In the spin-off The Big Professional Challenge, she took third place in 2019 and 2020 and won the competition in 2021 and 2022. In 2023 and 2024 she did not participate due to pregnancy.

Renata Lusin performance in Let’s Dance
Season (year)	Partner	Placement
11 (2018)	Jimi Blue Ochsenknecht	10
12 (2019)	Jan Hartmann	14
13 (2020)	Moritz Hans	Runner-up
14 (2021)	Rúrik Gíslason	Winner
Profi-Challenge 2021	Valentin Lusin	Winner
15 (2022)	Mathias Mester	Third
Profi-Challenge 2022	Christian Polanc	Winner

== Filmography ==
- 2018: Just a few words (short film)
- 2018-22: Let's Dance (TV show, RTL)
- 2020: Ninja Warrior Germany – The Strongest Show in Germany (TV show, RTL)
- 2020: Ramon Roselly: Infinite (Music Video)
- 2021: The RTL Summer Games (TV show, RTL)
- 2021: Who knows something like that? (quiz show, ARD)
- 2023: Inga Lindström: The Sweetness of Life (TV series)

== Achievements ==
- 2006: 2nd place at the German Championships over 10 dances
- 2007: 3rd place at the German Championships over 10 dances
- 2009: 1st place German Championship over 10 dances
- 2010: 1st place German Championship over 10 dances
- 2011: 2nd place at the German Championship over 10 dances
- 2013: 2nd place German championship over 10 dances
- 2013: 2nd place World Championship Showdance Standard
- 2013: 3rd place German Championship Standard
- 2014: 2nd place German Championship Hgr combination
- 2015: 3rd place World Championship Showdance Standard
- 2015: 3rd place German Championship Hgr-S-Standard
- 2016: 2nd place World Championship Showdance Standard
- 2016: 3rd place German Championship Hgr-S-Standard
- 2017: 3rd place World Championship Showdance Standard
- 2017: 3rd place World Championship Showdance Professionals Standard
- 2018: 1st place German Championship over 10 professional dances
- 2018: 2nd place German Championship Showdance Professionals Standard
- 2019: 2nd place WDSF World Championship Showdance Professionals Standard
- 2019: 1st place WDSF Open Professionals Standard
- 2019: 1st place German Championship Professionals Standard
- 2021: 1st place World Championship Showdance Professionals Standard
