= Let's Dance – Let's Christmas (German TV series) =

Season of television series

- Genre: Reality competition
- Based on: Let's Dance
- Presented by: Daniel Hartwich; Sylvie Meis
- Judges: Jorge Gonzalez; Motsi Mabuse; Joachim Llambi
- Country of origin: Germany
- Original language: German
- No. of seasons: 1
- No. of episodes: 2

Original release
- Network: RTL
- Release: December 20 – December 21, 2013

Let's Dance – Let's Christmas was a Christmas special show of the german dance competition Let's Dance. The show was broadcast in 2 live shows on December 20 and 21, 2013, on RTL. The judges were Jorge Gonzalez, Motsi Mabuse and Joachim Llambi. The hosts were Daniel Hartwich and Sylvie Meis.

Under the motto "Let's Dance – Let's Christmas", five former participants competed against each other in this two-part special edition. As announced on November 12, these were all previous season winners with the exception of Wayne Carpendale and Maite Kelly. Kelly was originally scheduled for the show, but canceled its participation due to scheduling reasons, which is why it was replaced by Moritz A. Sachs.

== Couples ==
Celebrity	Known for	Let's Dance history	Professional partner	Status
Manuel Cortez	Actor	season 6 winner	Oana Nechiti	Eliminated on December 20, 2013
Susan Sideropoulos	Actress	season 2 winner	Stefano Terrazzino	Eliminated on December 20, 2013
Moritz A. Sachs	Actor	season 4 runner-up	Isabel Edvardsson	Third place on December 21, 2013
Sophia Thomalla	Actress	season 3 winner	Massimo Sinató	Runner-up on December 21, 2013
Magdalena Brzeska	Gymnast	season 5 winner	Erich Klann	Winner on December 21, 2013

== Scoring chart ==
Couple	Place	1	2
Magdalena & Erich	1	26+23=49	28+29+29=86
Sophia & Massimo	2	26+30=56	28+29+29=86
Moritz & Isabel	3	26+25=51	20+26=46
Susan & Stefano	4	21+24=45	
Manuel & Oana	4	23+21=44	

Red numbers indicates the lowest score for each week.
Green numbers indicates the highest score for each week.
indicates the couple eliminated that week.
indicates the returning couple that finished in the bottom three.
indicates the winning couple.
indicates the runner-up couple.
indicates the third-place couple.

=== Averages ===
This table only counts for dances scored on a traditional 30-points scale.

Rank by Average	Place	Couple	Total points	Performances	Average
1	2	Sophia & Massimo	142	5	28.4
2	1	Magdalena & Erich	135	5	27.0
3	3	Moritz & Isabel	97	4	24.3
4	4	Susan & Stefano	45	2	22.5
5	4	Manuel & Oana	44	2	22.0

== Highest and lowest scoring performances ==
The best and worst performances in each dance according to the judges' 30-point scale are as follows:

Dance	Best dancer(s)	Highest score	Worst dancer(s)	Lowest score
Paso doble	Magdalena Brzeska	29	Susan Sideropoulos	21
Jive	Sophia Thomalla	28	Manuel Cortez	23
Tango	Magdalena Brzeska	26		
Salsa	Moritz Sachs	26		
Rumba	Sophia Thomalla	30	Magdalena Brzeska	23
Waltz	Manuel Cortez	21		
Contemporary	Sophia Thomalla	29		
Foxtrot	Magdalena Brzeska	28	Moritz Sachs	25
Quickstep	Sophia Thomalla	26		
Viennese Waltz	Magdalena Brzeska	29	Moritz Sachs	20
Jazz	Sophia Thomalla	29		
Cha-cha-cha	Sophia Thomalla	29		
Flamenco	Magdalena Brzeska	29		
American Smooth	Magdalena Brzeska	29		
Freestyle	Magdalena Brzeska; Sophia Thomalla	29	Moritz Sachs	26

== Weekly scores and songs ==
Unless indicated otherwise, individual judges scores in the charts below (given in parentheses) are listed in this order from left to right: Jorge Gonzalez, Motsi Mabuse, Joachim Llambi.

=== Show 1: December 20, 2013 ===
Running order

Couple	Score	Style	Music
Susan & Stefano	21 (8, 8, 5)	Paso Doble	"Left Outside Alone" — Anastacia
Susan & Stefano	24 (9, 9, 6)	Jive	"All I Want For Christmas Is You" — Mariah Carey
Manuel & Oana	23 (10, 9, 4)	Jive	"You Never Can Tell" — Chuck Berry
Manuel & Oana	21 (8, 8, 5)	Waltz	"Have Yourself A Merry Little Christmas" — Ralph Blane
Magdalena & Erich	26 (10, 10, 6)	Tango	"Por Una Cabeza" — Carlos Gardel
Magdalena & Erich	23 (10, 10, 3)	Rumba	"Last Christmas" — WHAM!
Moritz & Isabel	26 (9, 10, 7)	Salsa	"Baila Me" — Gipsy Kings
Moritz & Isabel	25 (9, 9, 7)	Foxtrot	"Santa Baby" — Eartha Kitt
Sophia & Massimo	26 (9, 9, 8)	Quickstep	"Sleigh Ride" — LeRoy Anderson
Sophia & Massimo	30 (10, 10, 10)	Rumba	"Fields of Gold" — Sting

=== Show 2: December 21, 2013 ===
Running order

Couple	Score	Style	Music
Sophia & Massimo	28 (10, 9, 9)	Jive	"Rockin' Around the Christmas Tree" — Brenda Lee
Sophia & Massimo	29 (10, 10, 9)	Freestyle; Jazz; Jazz; Cha-Cha-Cha	Michael Jackson-Medley; Smooth Criminal — Michael Jackson; Thriller — Michael Jackson; Black or White — Michael Jackson
Sophia & Massimo	29 (10, 9, 10)	Contemporary	"Ave Maria" — Charles Gounod
Moritz & Isabel	20 (8, 7, 5)	Viennese Waltz	"White Christmas" — Bing Crosby
Moritz & Isabel	26 (9, 9, 8)	Freestyle; Paso Doble; Jive; Viennese Waltz	Queen-Medley; We Will Rock You — Queen; Don't Stop Me Now — Queen; We Are the Champions — Queen
Magdalena & Erich	28 (10, 10, 8)	Foxtrot	"Winter Wonderland" — Felix Bernard
Magdalena & Erich	29 (10, 10, 9)	Freestyle; Paso Doble; Flamenco; Viennese Waltz	Pirates of the Caribbean-Medley; He's a Pirate — Klaus Badelt; Angelica — Hans Zimmer; The Black Pearl — Klaus Badelt
Magdalena & Erich	29 (10, 10, 9)	American Smooth	"I'll Be Home for Christmas" — Bing Crosby
