= Wayne Carpendale =

German actor

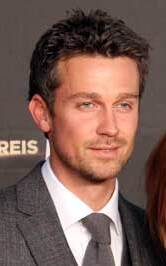
Carpendale in 2012

Wayne Howard Carpendale (born 3 March 1977) is a German actor and television presenter. He is the son of pop singer Howard Carpendale.

== Early life and education ==
Born in Frechen, Germany, Carpendale studied at the Stowe boarding school in Buckingham, England from 1992 to 1995, and graduated with an English university entrance qualification. There, he first came into contact with acting when he took part in the school musical Joseph and the Amazing Technicolor Dreamcoat. After graduating from high school, Carpendale initially studied business administration at the Otto Beisheim School of Management (WHU) in Vallendar. He also completed his intermediate diploma at the Westfälische Wilhelms-Universität in Münster. He dropped out of his studies after completing his intermediate diploma to pursue acting. In 1999, Carpendale took acting classes at the Lee Strasberg Theatre and Film Institute in New York.

== Career ==
Carpendale became known through the soap opera Unter uns, where he played the role of Maximilian Pfitzer from February 2000 to October 2001. He also appeared in the hospital series Alphateam – Die Lebensretter im OP and in various television productions such as Die Kristallprinzessin. In 2003, he portrayed Old Surehand at the Karl May Festival in Bad Segeberg.

From November 2005 to May 2007, he played one of the main roles in the ARD series Storm of Love, appearing in 60 episodes until his character was killed off. At the end of 2007 through April 2008, he returned as the twin brother of his deceased character. In 2006, Carpendale played the role of Dirk Scheerer on Unser Charly. During the show's summer break, he took on the male lead in the Rosamunde Pilcher film Die Liebe ihres Lebens, directed by Michael Steinke.

In 2006, Carpendale was a participant in the first season of the RTL show Let's Dance. His dance partner was the Swedish professional dancer Isabel Edvardsson. In the final, the couple defeated actress Wolke Hegenbarth and her dance partner Oliver Seefeldt.

From January 2009 to May 2013, Carpendale played the title character Dr. Jan Bergmann in the series The Country Doctor. He has had additional guest roles in other television series. In the summer of 2013 and 2014, he appeared again at the Karl May Festival, this time playing the main role of Old Shatterhand.

=== As a host ===
From October to December 2006, Carpendale hosted the eight-part Saturday evening show Dancing on Ice on RTL with Mirjam Weichselbraun. Since July 2014, he has hosted the new edition of the show Deal or No Deal and from December 2014 to February 2015 the new edition of Nur die Liebe zählt. He also hosted Keep Your Money (a new version of Rette die Million!). Since 11 September 2015, he has hosted the show Superkids – Die größten kleinen Talente der Welt. In 2016, he and his wife hosted the show Ran an den Mann for two seasons.

== Personal life ==
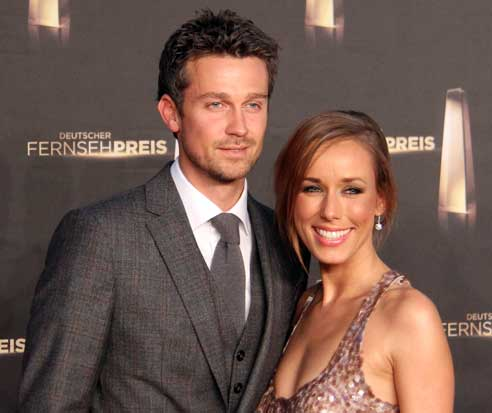
Carpendale with his wife

After a three-year relationship with Yvonne Catterfeld from 2004 to 2007, Carpendale has been in a relationship with presenter Annemarie Warnkross since November 2007 and has been married since September 2013. The two have a son named Mads together.

== Filmography ==
=== Acting roles ===
- 2000–2001: Unter uns
- 2002: Die Kristallprinzessin
- 2002: Hochwürden wird Papa
- 2003: Rosamunde Pilcher – Paradies der Träume
- 2005: Hallo Robbie!
- 2005, 2013: SOKO 5113
- 2006: Die Rosenheim-Cops – Wellness bis zum Ende
- 2006: Rosamunde Pilcher – Die Liebe ihres Lebens
- 2005–2007: Unser Charly
- 2006–2008: Sturm der Liebe
- 2006, 2012: Küstenwache
- 2007: girl friends – Freundschaft mit Herz
- 2007: Im Tal der wilden Rosen – Ritt ins Glück
- 2009–2013: Der Landarzt
- 2010: Das Traumschiff – Panama
- 2010: Das Traumhotel – Chiang Mai
- 2010: Notruf Hafenkante
- 2011: In aller Freundschaft
- 2011: Emilie Richards - Sehnsucht nach Paradise Island
- 2012: Lebe dein Leben
- 2012, 2014: SOKO Stuttgart
- 2012: ProSiebens 1001 Nacht – Der verflixte Flaschengeist
- 2013, 2015: Lerchenberg
- 2013–2015: Mord in bester Gesellschaft
- 2015: Bitteres Erbe
- 2014: SOKO Köln
- 2014: Die Garmisch-Cops
- 2014: Der Staatsanwalt
- 2014: Kreuzfahrt ins Glück – Hochzeitsreise nach Dubai
- 2014: Alarm für Cobra 11 – Die Autobahnpolizei
- 2015: Der Alte
- 2015–2016: Heldt
- 2018: Cecelia Ahern: Ein Moment fürs Leben
- 2018: Einstein
- 2018: jerks.
- 2019: SOKO München
- 2019: Hubert ohne Staller
- 2021: Beutolomäus und die vierte Elfe
- 2022: Fritzie – Der Himmel muss warten
- 2022: Das Traumschiff – Coco Island
- 2023: Bettys Diagnose

=== Television appearances ===
- 2006: Let's Dance – Contestant
- 2006: Dancing on Ice – Moderator
- 2013, 2020: 5 gegen Jauch – Contestant
- 2014–2015: Deal or No Deal – Moderator
- 2014: Die perfekte Minute – Contestant
- 2014–2015: Nur die Liebe zählt – Moderator
- 2015–2016: Superkids – Die größten kleinen Talente der Welt – Moderator
- 2015: Keep your Money – Moderator
- 2016: Ran an den Mann, 2 Staffeln – Moderator
- 2017: Duell der Stars – Die Sat.1 Promiarena – Contestant
- 2017: Superpets – Die talentiertesten Tiere der Welt – Moderator
- 2018: Genial daneben – Das Quiz – Contestant
- 2020: Buchstaben Battle – Contestant
- 2022: Hirschhausens Quiz des Menschen – Contestant
- 2022: The Taste – Moderator (Vertretung Folge 1 & 2)
- 2023: Herz an Bord – Moderator (Vox)

== Theatre ==
- 2003: Karl-May-Spiele Bad Segeberg; Role: Old Surehand
- 2013–2014: Karl-May-Spiele Bad Segeberg; Roll: Old Shatterhand

== Charity work ==
- Since 2004, Carpendale has been a supporter of Aktion Mahlzeit
- Since 2007, he has been an ambassador of the Deutschen Kinderpreises for the broadcast commissioner of the Protestant Church in Germany und World Vision Deutschland.
- Since 2018, he has been involved with McDonald's Kinderhilfe Stiftung and he and his wife Annemarie are patrons of Ronald McDonald Haus München-Großhadern
