= Ann-Kathrin Bendixen =

German world traveler, Internet celebrity and author

Ann-Kathrin Bendixen (born 8 December 1999; pseudonym: Affe auf Bike, English translation: Monkey on Bike) is a German world traveler, Internet celebrity and author.

== Career ==
Ann-Kathrin Bendixen was born in Timmersiek, Schleswig-Holstein. She attended the Siegfried Lenz School in Handewitt and passed her Abitur there in spring 2019. In her youth she played football. At the age of 18, she developed a mucocele after a bone operation, which was removed in an emergency operation. Shaped by the associated fears, she bought a motorcycle, a 1982 Yamaha XT550, and began to travel the world in August 2019. She shares her experiences on social media. Her book BikerGirl: Wie ich die Freiheit suchte und das Leben fand, published in September 2021, reached number 17 on the Spiegel bestseller list. She also writes for websites and magazines such as Motorrad & Reisen and works as a photographer. Harley-Davidson Germany provided her with a custom motorcycle based on an RH975 Nightster in 2022 and appointed her as a brand ambassador.

In 2023, she participated in Season 3 of the reality game show 7 vs. Wild teaming with wildlife photographer Hannah Assil. As of September 2023, she has so far traveled Western Sahara, South America, Southern Europe, Thailand, Iceland and the US.

== Works ==
- BikerGirl. Wie ich die Freiheit suchte und das Leben fand. riva Verlag, Munich 2021, ISBN 978-3-7423-1931-9.
- Allein um die Welt. Die beste Entscheidung meines Lebens. In: Brigitte. Starke Frauen - starke Storys. Gruner + Jahr, 6 December 2021 (brigitte.de).
- Reisetagebuch Island – Unterwegs mit Affe auf Bike. In: Motorrad & Reisen. Touren- & Reiseberichte. Motorrad & Reisen Verlag GmbH, 2022 (motorradundreisen.de).
