= Kathrin Menzinger =

Austrian dancer (born 1988)

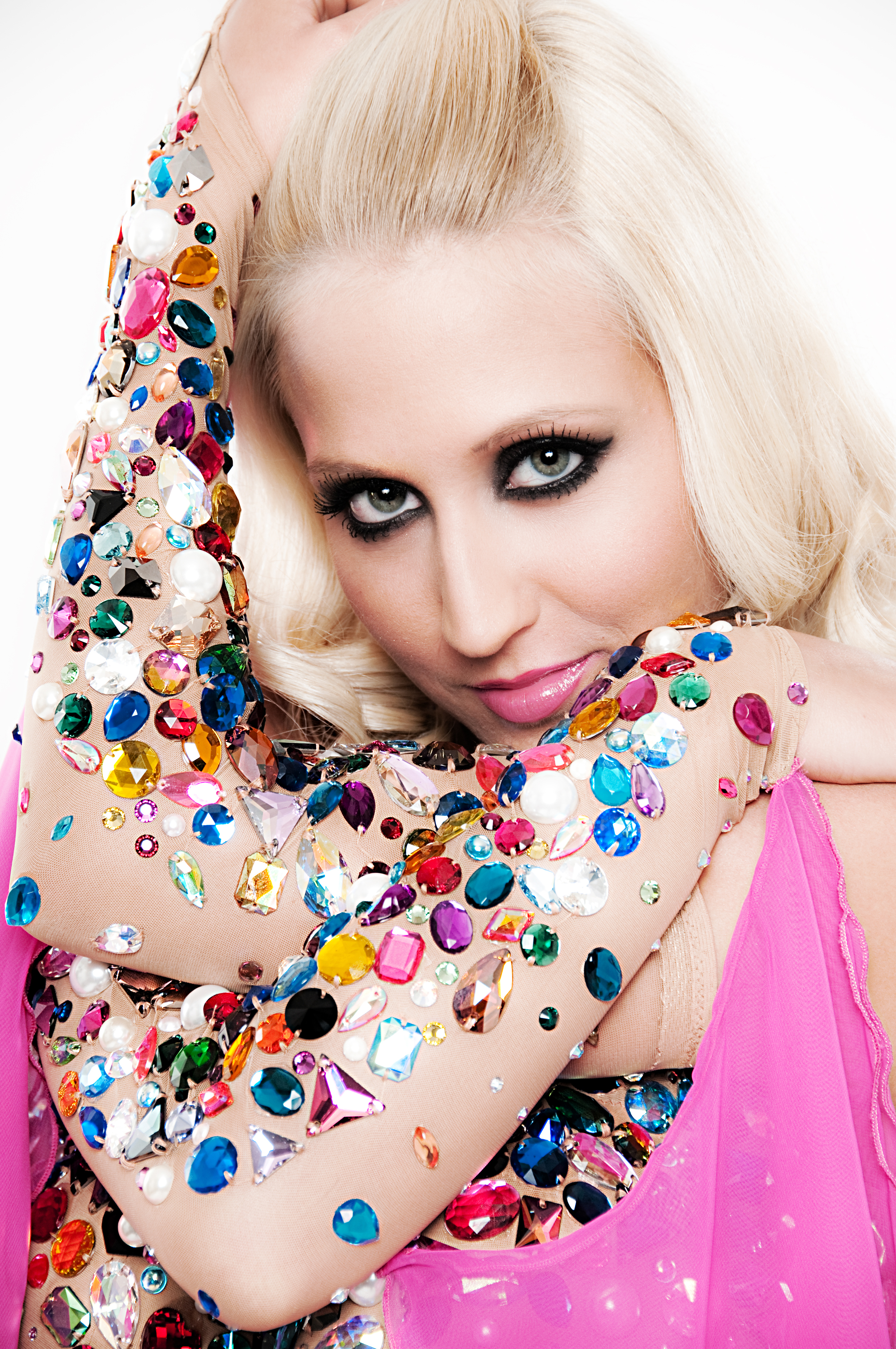
- Born: 24 September 1988 (age 38); Vienna, Austria

Kathrin Menzinger (born 24 September 1988 in Vienna) is an Austrian dancer. Menzinger and her partner won five World Championship titles in Showdance Latin and Standard between 2015 and 2017.

== Biography ==
She started to dance at the age of 3, first with ballet, but soon changed to Ballroom and Latin dancing. Together with her brother, Patrick Menzinger, she won numerous Junior- and Youth national Dancesport Championships in Austria during the years 1999–2004.

In 2004, she changed her partner and teamed up with the Canadian dancer Vadim Garbuzov, with whom she reached the final of the WDSF World Youth Ten Dance Championship 2005 in Antwerp (Belgium). 2006 they won the Austrian National Ten Dance Championship, and in the same year they managed to reach the Semifinal of the World Ten Dance Championship in Moscow.

Due to an injury she had to leave competitive dancing for two years, but came back in 2009, and placed 4th in the European Cup Ten Dance 2010 in Minsk, Belarus.

In 2011 she started her TV-career by starring in the Austrian version of the BBC-format Strictly come dancing, called "Dancing Stars", as a professional dancer, teaming up with the Austrian Journalist and Comedian Dieter Chmelar.

In July 2011 she and her partner Vadim Garbuzov also appeared in the ORF-production " Night of the Stars ", which brought them an entry in the Internet Movie Database IMDb.

2012 she took part in the 7th season of "Dancing Stars" in Austria again, this time together with the young Austrian actor David Heissig. In the 4th round they were eliminated. 2013 she teamed up with the Austrian musical Star Lukas Perman, they reached the final show and finished third. 2014 her partner in "Dancing Stars" was the Austrian former ski jumper Hubert Neuper, they reached again the final show, finishing third.

2014 she and her partner Vadim Garbuzov took part in the "New Years Concert" of the Viennese Philharmonic Orchestra, performing the famous Blue Danube Waltz live at the Wiener Musikverein to their own choreography.

In 2012 they started in WDSF Showdance competitions, and managed to reach the finals of the 2012 and 2013 World Championships in Beijing, and also the finals of the World Dance Sport Games 2013 in Kaoshiung in Taiwan.

2014 they turned Professional, and won the European Championship Showdance Latin, and placed second in the world championships Showdance Latin and Standard and the European Championships Showdance Standard.

2015 she took part in the RTL production "Let's Dance" together with the former soccer player Hans Sarpei and won the competition.

Just one day after the final show of Let's Dance she managed to win together with her partner Vadim Garbuzov the World Championship Show Dance Latin of the Prodessional Division of the WDSF.

In November 2015 she also won the World Championship ShowDance Standard, again with her partner Vadim, thus being the first couple ever to hold both titles in Showdance Latin and Standard. Garbuzov and Menzinger won the World Championships in Latin Showdance in 2016 for the second time in Vienna. In 2017, they won two more World Championship titles in Vienna—one in April in the Showdance Latin category, and another in December in the Showdance Standard category.

In 2018 and 2019, they changed associations and competed twice in the WDC World Championships—once in Showdance Latin in 2018 and once in Showdance Standard in 2019. They placed second both times.

In 2019, she started dating her boyfriend Maximilian Kumptner, a Viennese photographer.

In 2022, she was part of Let's Dance again and won for a second time when she was paired up with Ninja Warrior Germany athlete and Circus Performer René Casselly.

In 2022, she and her partner participated in the WDSF World Championships in the Showdance Latin category and placed second.

== Achievements ==
- World Youth Ten Dance Championship Finalist 2005
- Austrian Ten Dance Champion 2006
- World Ten Dance Championship Semifinalist 2006
- European Cup Ten Dance Finalist 2010
- 6-times Finalist World Championships ShowDance Latin and Standard 2012 - 2013
- Vice-World Champion Showdance Latin and Standard 2014
- European Champion Showdance Latin 2014
- World Champion Showdance Latin 2015
- World Champion Showdance Standard 2015
- European Champion Showdance Standard 2016
- European Champion Showdance Latin 2016
- World Champion Showdance Latin 2016
- World Champion Showdance Latin 2017
- World Champion Showdance Standard 2017
- Vice-World Champion Showdance Latin 2018
- Vice-World Champion Showdance Standard 2019
- Vice-World Champion Showdance Latin 2022
