= Riva Verlag =

German book publisher

riva Verlag
- Founded: 2004
- Headquarters: Munich, Germany
- Parent: Münchner Verlagsgruppe

The Riva Verlag (Proper spelling riva Verlag) is a German Book publisher from Munich. It was founded in 2004 and belongs to the Munich-based publishing group which is a subsidiary of the Swedish media group Bonnier since 2017.

== History ==
Christian Jund founded FinanzBuch Verlag in 1997. This initially focused on investor, stock market and financial literature. With the bursting of the dotcom bubble, demand from beginners and professional investors alike fell. The publisher therefore opted for a broader program. Riva Verlag was launched in 2004 as a sign of the company's new direction.

Riva Verlag initially focused on specialist books on sports, fitness and nutrition. It became known to a broad public in 2008 with the publication of Bushido's biography, which became a bestseller. In 2012, Riva Verlag published the book "Jenseits des Protokolls" (Beyond the Protocol) by Bettina Wulff with great media attention.

== Programm ==
The Riva Verlag program currently comprises 2200 titles by 1100 authors, including, for example, MontanaBlack, Nino de Angelo, Elisabeth Raether and Mark Lauren. One focus is on the topics of sports, fitness and nutrition. In addition, Riva Verlag publishes humor and gift books as well as biographies of important musicians and athletes and other public figures. In addition, there are works on social and political topics.
