= Vadim Garbuzov =

Ballroom dancer and showman

- Born: 8 May 1987 (age 39); Kharkiv, Ukraine
- Occupation: Dancer
- Website: vadimgarbuzov.com

Vadim Garbuzov is a Canadian and Austrian ballroom dancer, showman and choreographer of Ukrainian descent. He was the World Youth Championship finalist in 2005, the winner of the Austrian TV program Dancing Stars in 2012, 2014 and 2020, and the professional world champion in Latin and Standard show dance 2015-2017. Currently, he is a Pro on the German TV Show Let’s Dance. Grandson of the writer Yulii Garbuzov.

== Biography ==
Vadim Garbuzov was born on 8 May 1987 in Kharkiv, Ukraine. In 1994 his parents immigrated to Canada, and took him to dance school in Vancouver at the age of seven. For the next several years, frequently traveling between Kharkiv and Vancouver, he attended secondary school and dance training in both cities.

In 2003 Vadim Garbuzov and his partner Nadiya Dyatlova won the Canadian Youth Championships in Latin, and in 2004 in Standard.

In the same year, he started to dance with a new partner, Kathrin Menzinger. In 2005, he made it into the finals of the World Youth Ten-Dance Cup in Antwerp. In 2006, after switching to the adult category, he became Austrian ten-dance champion and reached the semi-finals in world ten-dance championship in Moscow.

In 2007, Garbuzov was granted Austrian citizenship in addition to Canadian. In 2008 he graduated from the Faculty of Dance of Kharkiv State Academy of Physical Culture.

In 2009, he again paired up with Kathrin Menzinger, and in 2010 they made it into the final of the European Ten-Dance Cup in Minsk.

In 2011 Vadim started the television line of his career as a professional dancer in the sixth season of Dancing Stars with TV presenter Alfons Haider. First in the world, he danced with another man in this Dancing with the Stars TV format. In the same year with his competition partner Kathrin Menzinger, Vadim starred in the ORF eins program Starnacht am Wörthersee, which brought him an entry in the Internet Movie Database (IMDb) as a show dancer. In 2012, with the singer Petra Frey, he won the seventh season of Dancing Stars.

Since 2012, Garbuzov and Menzinger have regularly taken part in the world championships of the show dance category. In September 2012, in Beijing, they became finalists of the World Latin Freestyle Championship. In early 2013, Garbuzov and Menzinger turned professionals of World DanceSport Federation. At their first professional competition in Merano they took fourth place in Freestyle Latin World Cup. In 2014 in Vienna, they came second in Standard at the Professional European Show Dance Championship.

The second TV victory came to Vadim in the ninth season of Dancing Stars, in 2014, when he was coupled with Austrian actress Roxanne Rapp. In the same year, he took part in the New Year's Concert of the Viennese Philharmonic Orchestra, performing with his dance partner Menzinger the famous Blue Danube Waltz live at the Wiener Musikverein to a worldwide audience of more than 50 million TV spectators.

In October 2014 Vadim and Kathrin came second in the World Professional Freestyle Championship in Latin. In November 2014, they became European Latin show dance champions in Dresden, and in December they took second place out of 13 couples at the show dance Standard at Professional World Championships in Salou.

In June 2015 Garbuzov and Menzinger became world champions in professional show dance Latin and in November of the same year, they became world champions in professional show dance Standard.

In 2015 Vadim took part in the eighth season of Let's Dance, on German RTL Television, paired with the German actress Beatrice Richter. In 2016 he performed on the ninth season of this program, paired with the German actresses Franziska Traub and Sonja Kirchberger.

In March 2016 Garbuzov and Menzinger won the European Professional Showdance Championship in Standard and in September of the same year, they won the WDSF PD European Championship Show Dance Latin. In April 2017, they again confirmed the title of world champions in a professional Latin show.

In 2018, Vadim Garbuzov started dating his girlfriend Nicole Ettlinger, an Austrian former Latin dancer and TV presenter for the Austrian TV channel Servus TV.

In 2021 Vadim Garbuzov is part of the fourteenth season of Let's Dance together with the first German Prince Charming Nicolas Puschmann, which makes them the first men couple in the history of the show.

== Achievements ==
Vadim Garbuzov and Kathrin Menzinger

- Canadian Youth Latin champion 2003
- Canadian Youth Standard champion 2004
- World Youth Ten Dance championship finalist 2005
- Austrian Ten Dance champion 2006
- World Ten Dance championship semifinalist 2006
- European Cup Ten Dance finalist 2010
- European Show Dance Latin champion 2014
- World vice-champion in Show Dance Latin and Standard 2014
- European vice-champion in Show Dance Standard 2014
- World champion in Show Dance Latin 2015
- World champion in Show Dance Standard 2015
- European champion Show Dance Standard 2016
- European champion Show Dance Latin 2016
- World Professional champion Show Dance Latin 2017
- World Professional champion Show Dance Standard 2017
- Silver Medalist WDC Professional World Championship Showdance Baden Baden Germany 2018
- Silver Medalist Professional Latin Showdance Dutch Open 2018
- Bronze Medallist WDC Professional World Championship Showdance Standard Bonn Germany 2018
- Vice World Champions WDC Profession Showdance Standard Vienna Austria 2019
- Silver Medalist WDSF PD World Championship Show dance Latin Vienna Austria 2022

== Choreographing ==
- 2014 Choreographing and live performing "The Blue Danube Waltz" at the New Years Concerts of the Viennese Philharmonics
- 2014 Head choreographer for the musical "Court Jester" at the Viennese theater Metropol
- 2015 Head choreographer for the musical "Ti Amo" at the Metropol theater
- 2018 Show act Choreographer for all the professionals in the final of the German Dancing with the Stars "Let's Dance"
- 2021-2022 Head Choreographer of the Let's Dance Live Tour
