= Rebecca Mir =

German model and TV presenter (born 1991)

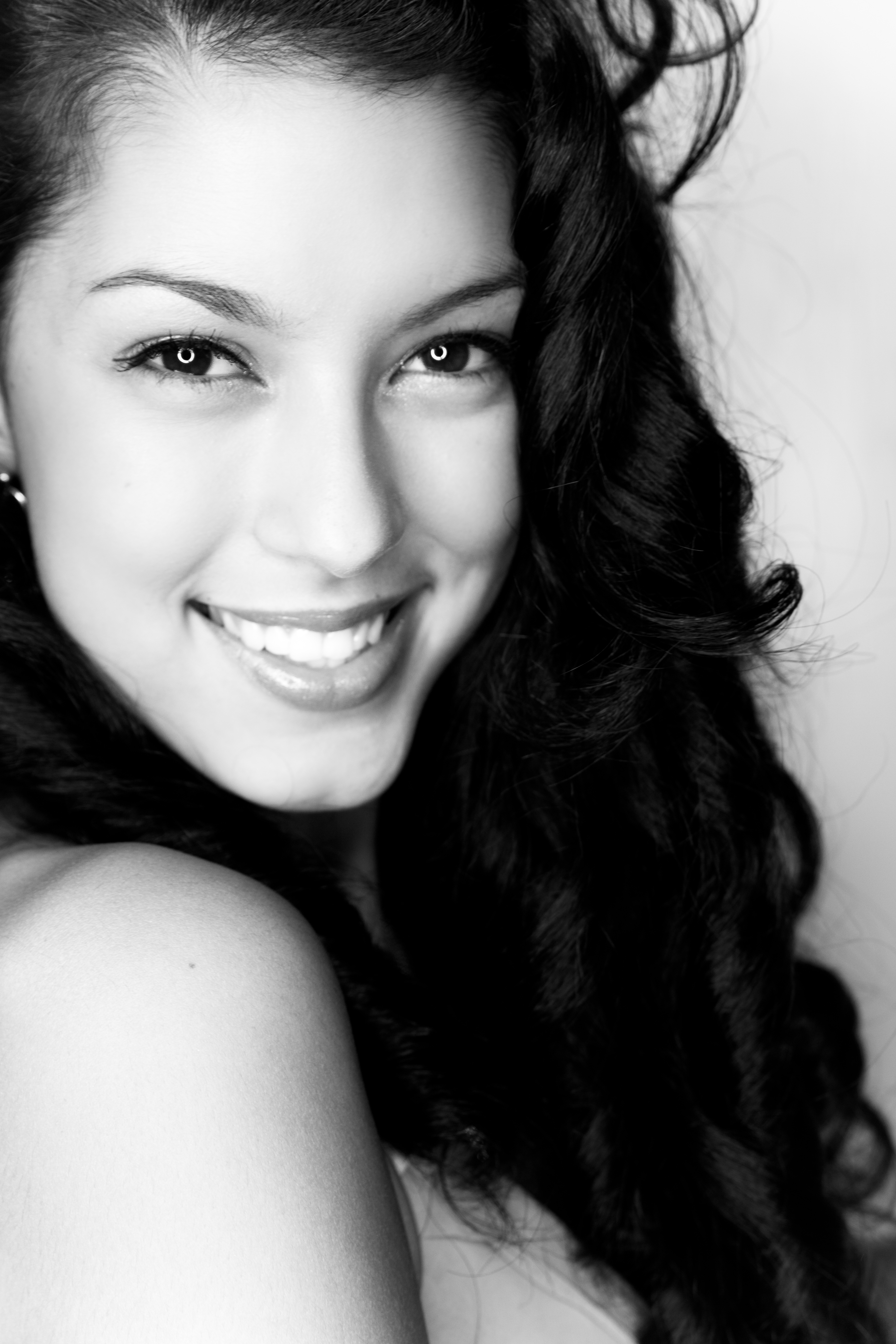
- Born: Rebecca-Zarah Mir; 23 December 1991 (age 33); Aachen, Germany
- Occupation: Model
- Years active: 2011–present
- Spouse: Massimo Sinato (2015–present)
- Children: 1
- Modeling information
- Height: 1.79 m (5 ft 10 1/2 in)
- Hair color: Brown
- Eye color: Brown

Rebecca-Zarah Mir (born 23 December 1991) is a German model and television presenter. She came second in the sixth season of the Castingshow Germany's Next Topmodel.

== Career ==
After failing at the 2009 casting for the fifth season of Germany's Next Topmodel, Mir took part in a six-month long modeling course, and then reapplied in 2010. Along with 49 other participants, she was selected to compete on the shows' sixth season, where she secured jobs with designers such as Dirndl manufacturer Krüger. In the show's finale on 9 June 2011 Mir finished second, before Amelie Klever and behind Jana Beller.

She contracted with ONEeins Management, a wholly owned subsidiary of Heidi Klum GmbH. She walked for the Lena Hoschek and Minx at the Mercedes Benz Fashion Week in Berlin and presented parts of the Jorge Gonzalez collection at the "Chicas Walk".

In July 2011, Mir participated in the entertainment broadcast by Jürgen von der Lippe Ich liebe Deutschland. In August 2011, she hosted the Reality TV format Die Alm. One month later she walked at New York Fashion Week for the fashion designer Christian Siriano, who won Heidi Klum's US Castingshow Project Runway in 2008. She was on the cover of Cosmopolitan in 2011 and on GQ in 2012.

Since then Mir has mainly worked on the German fashion market. At the 2012 Mercedes-Benz Fashion Week Berlin she walked the Grazia Preview as well as the Anja Gockel fashion show. In 2013 Mir walked the Berlin catwalks of labels such as Minx by Eva Lutz, Lena Hoschek, Anja Gockel, Schacky and Jones, Laurèl and Miranda Konstantinidou. At the Berlin Fashion Week 2014 Mir was booked by Anja Gockel, Riani, Dimitri and Miranda Konstantinidou. In June 2012, she appeared on the cover of the German FHM, after she was ranked the Sexiest Women in the World on FHM's top 100 reader's poll.

On 7 June 2012 she hosted the backstage show at the Germany's Next Topmodel finale of the seventh season, as well as a show about the most unforgettable moments of the season on 14 June 2012. Mir hosted both of these shows for the following seasons. On 30 July 2012 she co-moderated the ProSieben magazine taff along with Daniel Aminati. Mir reported live from the Oscars for ProSieben in the same year. On 20 November 2012 she made her acting debut in the ARD television series In aller Freundschaft as medical student Anna Fischer, which she kept until 2013.

Since March 2013 she has been contracting with B W M Communications. During the Berlin Fashion Week in the summer of 2013, she wore Julia Starps sustainable fashion. On 21 March 2013 she and Alexander Mazza moderated the Vienna Awards for Fashion and Lifestyle, on 23 November 2013 the TV total Turmspringen and on 8 March 2014 the Wok World Championship together with Steven Gätjen and Matze Knop.

== Personal life ==
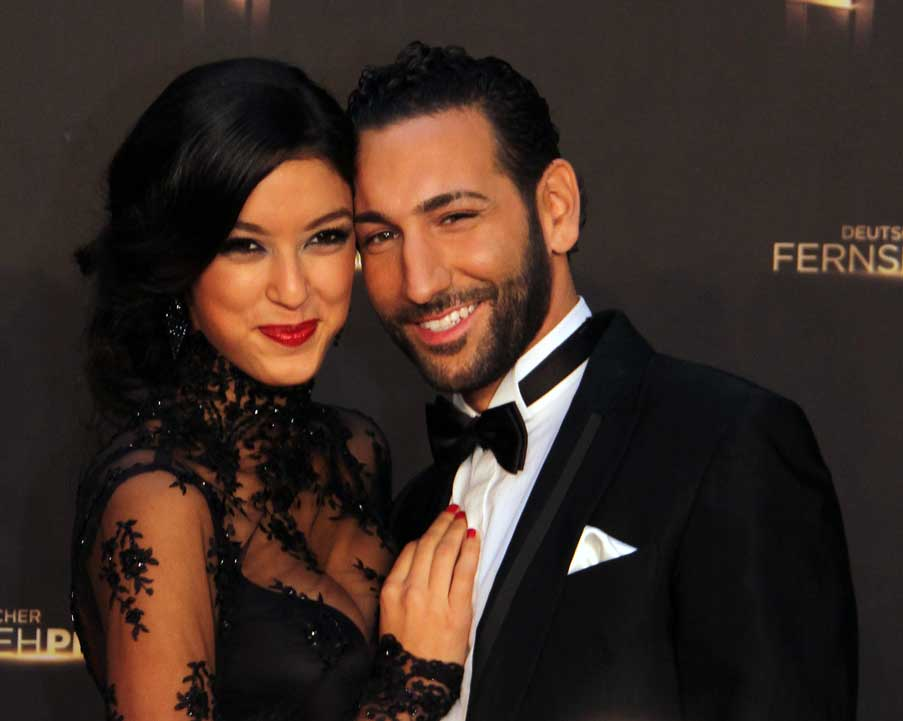
Mir with her husband Massimo Sinató, 2012

Mir's father Asam is an immigrant from Afghanistan while her mother Mareike is German. She has an older brother and a sister, who is thirteen years younger and lived until 2012 with her mother in Monschau-Imgenbroich near Aachen. She attended the St. Michael High School in Monschau. From December 2011 to April 2012, she was associated with singer Sebastian Deyle. In August 2012 she announced that she is together with her Let's-dance partner Massimo Sinató. In the fifth season of the show, they were second behind Magdalena Brzeska and Erich Klann. Mir and Sinató married in Sicily on 27 June 2015.

== Filmography ==
- 2011: Germany's Next Topmodel
- 2011: Die Alm
- 2012: Mein Mann kann
- 2012: Let's Dance
- 2012: taff
- 2012–2013: In aller Freundschaft
- 2013: Frag doch mal die Maus
- 2013: Task Force Berlin
- 2014: Jetzt wird's schräg
- 2015: Jungen gegen Mädchen
- 2015: Grill den Henssler
- 2016: Wer weiß denn sowas?
- 2016: Das Duell um die Geld
- 2016: Unsere Zeit ist jetzt
