= Deutschland sucht den Superstar season 17 =

Deutschland sucht den Superstar
- Season 17
- Hosted by: Alexander Klaws
- Judges: Dieter Bohlen; Pietro Lombardi; Oana Nechiti; Xavier Naidoo (Auditions & 'Recall'); Florian Silbereisen (Live Shows 2–4)
- Winner: Ramon Kaselowsky
- Runner-up: Chiara D'Amico

Release
- Original network: RTL
- Original release: 4 January – 4 April 2020

Season chronology
- ← Previous; Season 16 Next → Season 18

The seventeenth season of Deutschland sucht den Superstar began on 4 January 2020 on RTL. As in the previous year, the jury consisted of Dieter Bohlen, Oana Nechiti, Xavier Naidoo and Pietro Lombardi; before the live shows began, Xavier Naidoo was excluded from the jury, his place took Florian Silbereisen. Alexander Klaws was the new host. The season ended on 4 April 2020 with Ramon Roselly as the winner, after having received 80.82% percent from the public.

== Auditions and "Recall" ==
After 12 casting episodes, recorded on the Drachenfels, on Forggensee and on the Hanse Gate Hamburg, the 126 progressed candidates went to the "Recall" in Sölden. They initially appeared in larger groups, and amongst those who progressed thereafter in groups of two, three, or four. 22 of them - plus the four winners of the Golden CDs - received a ticket to South Africa. There, they were supported by the vocal coaches Juliette Schoppmann and André Franke. The remaining 11 candidates competed in an additional Recall in the Landschaftspark Duisburg-Nord for the Top 7 in the live shows. Groups of men and women sang in groups of two or three, after which the jury sent four participants on to the live shows. The remaining seven superstar aspirants had to perform solo performances, which led to the decision for the remaining three places. For the first time in the history of the show, there were only 7 contestants performing on the live shows.

== Finalists ==
Place	Contestant	Age	Hometown	Occupation	Status
1	Ramon Kaselowsky	25	Zschernitz	Building cleaner	Winner
2	Chiara D'Amico	18	Frankfurt	Student	Runner-up
3	Joshua Tappe	25	Holzminden	Client advisor	Eliminated in Round 2 Final Live Show
4	Paulina Wagner	22	Cologne	Student	Eliminated in Round 1 Final Live Show
5	Lydia Kelovitz	29	Sankt Egyden am Steinfeld, Austria	Insurance clerk, Wrestler	Eliminated; Live Show 3
6	Marcio Pereira Conrado	26	Glarus, Switzerland	Promoter	Eliminated; Live Show 2
7	Ricardo Rodrigues	21	Basel, Sweitzerland	Trainee (Educator)	Eliminated; Live Show 1

== Live shows ==
For the first time, the remaining three jurors each have a CD, on which they can give their live show candidate their 5% voting right.

Color key

Contestant received the fewest votes and was eliminated
Contestant was in the bottom two
Contestant received the most votes from the public
Contestant was announced as the season's winner
Contestant was announced as the runner-up

=== Week 1: Top 7 ===
Original airdate: 13 March 2020

Order	Contestant	Song	Result	Voting result
1	Ricardo Rodrigues	"There's Nothing Holdin' Me Back"	Eliminated	2.74% (7/7)
2	Paulina Wagner	"Hundert Prozent"	Safe	15.05% (2/7)
3	Marcio Pereira Conrado	"7 Years"	Safe	12.39% (3/7)
4	Chiara D'Amico	"In Your Eyes"	Bottom two	8.64% (6/7)
5	Joshua Tappe	"Sex on Fire"	Safe	10.73% (4/7)
6	Lydia Kelovitz	"Like a Prayer"	Safe	9.29% (5/7)
7	Ramon Kaselowsky	"Mandy"	Safe	51.16% (1/7)

Judges' gave their 5% Golden CD

- Bohlen: he gave his CD to the presenter Alexander Klaws, because he was hosting for the first time a live show
- Nechiti: Paulina Wagner
- Lombardi: Marcio Pereira Conrado

=== Week 2: Top 6 ===
Original airdate: 21 March 2020

Order	Contestant	Song	Result	Voting result
1	Chiara D'Amico	"Mein Herz"	Safe	15,24% (3/6)
2	Marcio Pereira Conrado	"Don't Feel Like Dancin'"	Eliminated	11,23% (6/6)
3	Lydia Kelovitz	"I Love Rock 'n' Roll"	Bottom two	12,65% (5/6)
4	Ramon Kaselowsky	"Rote Lippen soll man küssen"	Safe	46,79% (1/6)
5	Joshua Tappe	"Breaking Me"	Safe	13,87% (4/6)
6	Paulina Wagner	"Ich liebe das Leben"	Safe	20,22% (2/6)

Judges' gave their 5% Golden CD

- Bohlen: Chiara D'Amico
- Silbereisen: Lydia Kelovitz
- Nechiti: Marcio Pereira Conrado
- Lombardi: Paulina Wagner

=== Week 3: Top 5 - Semi-Final ===
Original airdate: 28 March 2020

In the semi-final, the top 5 performed two single songs: a "loud" and a "quiet" song.

Order	Contestant	Song (loud)	Song (quiet)	Result	Voting result
1	Paulina Wagner	"Unser Tag"	"Leiser"	Safe	21,92% (2/5)
2	Joshua Tappe	"194 Länder"	"Ich lass für Dich das Licht an"	Safe	18,26% (3/5)
3	Chiara D'Amico	"1000 Träume weit (Torneró)"	"Das Beste"	Bottom two	12,32% (4/5)
4	Ramon Kaselowsky	"Du hast ja Tränen in den Augen"	"Über sieben Brücken musst Du gehen"	Safe	57,63% (1/5)
5	Lydia Kelovitz	"Tainted Love"	"Million Reasons"	Eliminated	9,87% (5/5)

Judges' gave their 5% Golden CD

- Bohlen: Ramon Kaselowsky
- Silbereisen: Paulina Wagner
- Nechiti: Paulina Wagner
- Lombardi: Joshua Tappe

=== Week 4: Final ===
Original airdate: 4 April 2020

Order	Contestant	Song	Result	Voting result	Song	Result	Voting result	Winner's single	Result	Voting result
1	Joshua Tappe	"Supergirl"	Safe	10,49% (3/4)	"Hoch"	Eliminated in Round 2	10,82% (3/3)	N/A (already Eliminated)		
2	Paulina Wagner	"Sieben Leben für Dich"	Eliminated in Round 1	10,32% (4/4)	N/A (already Eliminated)					
3	Chiara D'Amico	"...Baby One More Time"	Safe	13,14% (2/4)	"Dance Monkey"	Safe	16,11% (2/3)	"Eine Nacht" (Dieter Bohlen)	Runner-up	19.18% (2/2)
4	Ramon Kaselowsky	"Tränen lügen nicht"	Safe	66,05% (1/4)	"100 Jahre sind noch zu kurz"	Safe	73,07% (1/3)	"Eine Nacht" (Dieter Bohlen)	Winner	80.82% (1/2)

== Elimination chart ==
Females	Males	Top 7	Winner	Runner-up

Safe	Most votes	Safe Last	Eliminated

Stage:		Top 7	Top 6	Top 5	Finals		
Week:		3/14	3/21	3/28	4/4		
Place	Contestant	Result					
1	Ramon Kaselowsky	1st 51.16%	1st 46.79%	1st 57.63%	1st 66.05%	1st 73.03%	Winner; 80.82%
2	Chiara D'Amico	6th 8.64%	3rd 15.24%	4th 12.32%	2nd 13.14%	2nd 16.11%	Runner-Up; 19.18%
3	Joshua Tappe	4th 10.73%	4th 13.87%	3rd 18.26%	3rd 10.49%	3rd 10.82%	
4	Paulina Wagner	2nd 15.05%	2nd 20.22%	2nd 21.92%	4th 10.32%		
5	Lydia Kelovitz	5th 9.29%	5th 12.65%	5th 9.87%			
6	Marcio Pereira Conrado	3rd 12.39%	6th 11.23%				
7	Ricardo Rodrigues	7th 2.74%					
