= Axel Bulthaupt =

German journalist, entertainer and television presenter

Axel Bulthaupt (born 21 February 1966) is a German journalist, entertainer and television presenter.

Bulthaupt was born in Melle, Lower Saxony, West Germany. He studied history and literature in Osnabrück and Hamburg. He worked during his university studies for a newspaper. After Bulthaupt finished his studies he began at German TV-station NDR. He was moderator of the TV magazine Jetzt kommt's and of the TV-show LebensArt. In 1994 Bulthaupt worked for the German TV-station MDR. There he was moderator of the TV magazine Brisant. Together with Griseldis Wenner and Ines Krüger he got 2000 the German TV award Bambi for Brisant.

2003 Bulthaupt started the history documentation Expedition Bulthaupt. Since 2004 Bulthaupt worked as host for the MDR magazine Sonntag - Die Show der Überraschungen. Bulthaupt was presenter from 1998 to 2003 of Grand Prix Eurovision de la Chanson and since 1996 each year of the TV gala José Carreras. Bulthaupt lives with his partner in Leipzig.
