= Isabel Edvardsson =

Swedish dancer

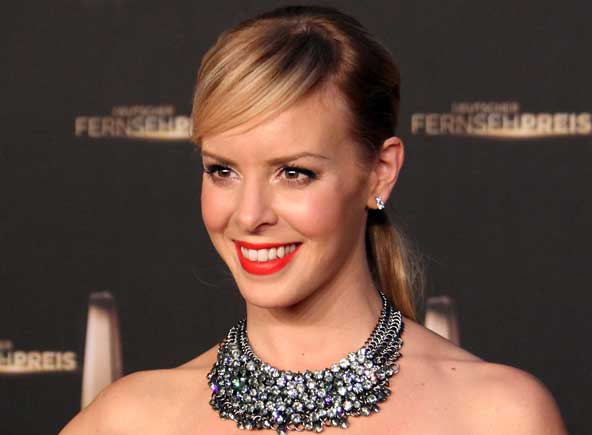
- Isabel Edvardsson in October 2012
- Born: Isabel Emilia Edvardsson; 22 June 1982 (age 43); Gothenburg, Sweden
- Spouse: Marcus Weiß

Isabel Emilia Edvardsson (born 22 June 1982) is a Swedish dancer.

== Early life ==
She was born in Gothenburg.

== Career ==
In 2006, she and partner Wayne Carpendale won the German version of Let's Dance on RTL Television.

In 2007, she danced with the footballer Giovane Élber.

She was on the jury of Let's Dance on TV4 in 2011.

== Personal life ==
From 2003 to 2014 she lived in Braunschweig in Germany, since 2014 she lives in Hamburg with her husband, dancer Marcus Weiß. In 2017 she became mother of a son.
