= Let's Dance (German TV series) season 15 =

Let's Dance
- Season 15

Release
- Original network: RTL
- Original release: 18 February (launch); 25 February 2022 – 20 May 2022

Season chronology
- ← Previous; Season 14 Next → Season 16

The fifteenth season of Let's Dance started on February 18, 2022, with the launch show on RTL, with the first regular show starting on February 25, 2022. Daniel Hartwich and Victoria Swarovski returned as hosts. Joachim Llambi, Motsi Mabuse and Jorge González returned as judges.

Like in the previous seasons during the launch show the 14 celebrities found out which professional dancer they will dance with for the next few weeks.

Dancing Stars 2022 were René Casselly & Kathrin Menzinger.

== Couples ==
In January 2022, RTL announced the 14 celebrities which will participate this season. On February 4, 2022, the professional dancers of the season were announced.

Celebrity	Known for	Professional partner	Status
Hardy Krüger jr.	Actor	Patricija Ionel	Withdrew on March 2, 2022
Cheyenne Ochsenknecht	Model & social media influencer	Evgeny Vinokurov	Eliminated 2nd on March 4, 2022
Riccardo Basile	Television presenter	Isabel Edvardsson	Eliminated 3rd on March 18, 2022
Lilly zu Sayn-Wittgenstein-Berleburg	Princess & socialite	Andrzej Cibis; Jimmie Surles (Week 2)	Eliminated 1st & 3rd on February 25 & March 18, 2022
Michelle	Schlager singer	Christian Polanc	Withdrew on March 30, 2022
Caroline Bosbach	Politician, author & daughter of Wolfgang Bosbach	Valentin Lusin	Eliminated 4th & 5th on March 25 & April 1, 2022
Timur Ülker	Gute Zeiten, schlechte Zeiten actor	Malika Dzumaev; Patricija Ionel (Week 2)	Eliminated 6th on April 8, 2022
Mike Singer	Singer-songwriter	Christina Luft	Eliminated 7th on April 22, 2022
Bastian Bielendorfer	Comedian & former candidate on Wer wird Millionär?	Ekaterina Leonova	Eliminated 8th on April 29, 2022
Sarah Mangione	Actress & television presenter	Vadim Garbuzov	Eliminated 9th on May 6, 2022
Amira Pocher	Television presenter	Massimo Sinató	Eliminated 10th on May 13, 2022
Mathias Mester	Paralympic athlete	Renata Lusin; Patricija Ionel (Week 5)	Third place on May 20, 2022
Janin Ullmann	Television presenter & actress	Zsolt Sándor Cseke	Runners-up on May 20, 2022
René Casselly	Ninja Warrior Germany champion, Circus performer	Kathrin Menzinger; Regina Luca (Week 4)	Winners on May 20, 2022

== Scoring chart ==
Couple	Place	1	2	3	4	5	6	7	8	9	10	11	12	13
René & Kathrin	1	19	19	23	29	26+8=34	—	20	30+19=49	26+4=30	30+30=60	23+30=53	28+29+27=84	28+30+30=88
Janin & Zsolt	2	22	20	22	30	26+7=33	28	29	30+19=49	30+8=38	30+30=60	30+30=60	26+30+24=80	27+29+30=86
Mathias & Renata	3	16	21	25	21	29+8=37	25	16	26+19=45	20+10=30	22+20=42	26+27=53	24+29+19=72	24+30+30=84
Amira & Massimo	4	21	14	17	21	22+7=29	25	30	22+19=41	23+6=29	30+25=55	28+23=51	23+28+22=73	
Sarah & Vadim	5	15	16	22	20	30+7=37	21	23	22+19=41	22+3=25	22+26=48	22+25=47		
Bastian & Ekaterina	6	10	8	—	7	9+8=17	13	17	17+19=36	16+2=18	13+13=26			
Mike & Christina	7	15	10	17	19	15+8=23	23	26	22+19=41	22+1=23				
Timur & Malika	8	18	15	11	—	24+8=32	20	26	19+19=38					
Caroline & Valentin	9	16	15	11	—	16+7=23	14	16						
Michelle & Christian	10	15	17	11	14	19+7=26	16	—						
Lilly & Andrzej	11	14	11	7	—	16+7=23								
Riccardo & Isabel	11	15	13	15	17	13+8=21								
Cheyenne & Evgeny	13	13	20	15										
Hardy & Patricija	14	13	—	—										

Red numbers indicates the lowest score for each week.
Green numbers indicates the highest score for each week.
indicates the couple eliminated that week.
indicates the returning couple that finished in the bottom two or three.
indicates the couple which was immune from elimination.
indicates the couple that didn't perform due to personal reasons.
indicates the couple that withdrew from the competition.
indicates the couple was eliminated but later returned to the competition.
indicates the winning couple.
indicates the runner-up couple.
indicates the third-place couple.

=== Averages ===
This table only counts for dances scored on a traditional 30-points scale.

Rank by average	Place	Couple	Total	Dances	Average
1	2	Janin & Zsolt	523	19	27.5
2	1	René & Kathrin	477	18	26.5
3	3	Mathias & Renata	450	19	23.7
4	4	Amira & Massimo	374	16	23.4
5	5	Sarah & Vadim	286	13	22.0
6	8	Timur & Malika	133	7	19.0
7	7	Mike & Christina	169	9	18.8
8	13	Cheyenne & Evgeny	48	3	16.0
9	10	Michelle & Christian	92	6	15.3
10	9	Caroline & Valentin	88	6	14.7
11	11	Riccardo & Isabel	73	5	14.6
12	14	Hardy & Patricija	13	1	13.0
13	6	Bastian & Ekaterina	123	10	12.3
14	11	Lilly & Andrzej	48	4	12.0

== Highest and lowest scoring performances ==
The best and worst performances in each dance according to the judges' marks are as follows:

Dance	Best dancer(s)	Best score	Worst dancer(s)	Worst score
Bachata	Sarah Mangione	26	Amira Pocher	25
Cha-cha-cha	René Casselly	28	Bastian Bielendorfer	7
Charleston	Amira Pocher; Janin Ullmann	30	Bastian Bielendorfer	9
Contemporary	Janin Ullmann; Sarah Mangione	30	Mathias Mester	24
Discofox Marathon	Mathias Mester	10	Mike Singer	1
Foxtrot	Janin Ullmann; René Casselly	30	Bastian Bielendorfer	13
Freestyle	Amira Pocher; René Casselly; Janin Ullmann; Mathias Mester	30	Bastian Bielendorfer	13
Jive	Timur Ülker; Mathias Mester	26	Riccardo Basile	15
Lindy hop	René Casselly; Janin Ullmann	30	-	
Paso doble	Mathias Mester	30	Bastian Bielendorfer	16
Quickstep	Janin Ullmann	30	Bastian Bielendorfer	8
Rumba	Janin Ullmann	30	Lilly zu Sayn-Wittgenstein-Berleburg	7
Salsa	Janin Ullmann; Mathias Mester	29	Bastian Bielendorfer; Mike Singer	10
Samba	Mathias Mester	27	René Casselly	20
Street	Mathias Mester	20	Bastian Bielendorfer	13
Tango	René Casselly; Janin Ullmann	30	Hardy Krüger jr.	13
Viennese waltz	Sarah Mangione	22	Riccardo Basile	13
Waltz	Janin Ullmann	28	Michelle	14

== Couples' highest and lowest scoring dances ==
According to the traditional 30-point scale.

Couples	Highest Scoring Dances	Score	Lowest Scoring Dances	Score
René & Kathrin	Tango (twice), Freestyle (Magic Moment), Lindy hop, Foxtrot & Freestyle (Finale)	30	Cha-cha-cha & Waltz	19
Janin & Zsolt	Contemporary, Charleston, Quickstep, Freestyle (Magic Moment), Lindy hop, Foxtrot, Tango, Rumba & Freestyle (Finale)	30	Cha-cha-cha	20
Mathias & Renata	Paso doble & Freestyle (Finale)	30	Salsa & Rumba	16
Amira & Massimo	Charleston & Freestyle (Magic Moment)	30	Salsa	14
Sarah & Vadim	Contemporary	30	Cha-cha-cha	15
Bastian & Ekaterina	Tango & Rumba	17	Cha-cha-cha	7
Mike & Christina	Contemporary	26	Salsa	10
Timur & Malika	Jive	26	Rumba	11
Caroline & Valentin	Viennese waltz, Tango & Waltz	16	Salsa	11
Michelle & Christian	Jive	19	Cha-cha-cha	11
Lilly & Andrzej	Quickstep	16	Rumba	7
Riccardo & Isabel	Cha-cha-cha	17	Viennese waltz & Salsa	13
Cheyenne & Evgeny	Quickstep	20	Cha-cha-cha	13
Hardy & Patricija	Tango	13	-	

== Weekly scores and songs ==
=== Launch show ===
For the sixth time, there was a launch show in which each celebrity met their partner for the first time. This show aired on 18 February 2022. In this first live show the celebrities and the professional partners danced in groups and each celebrity was awarded points by the judges and the viewers. At the end of the show the couple with the highest combined points was granted immunity from the first elimination in the following week.

After Renata and Valentin Lusin won the Profi Challenge together the year before, Renata Lusin was allowed to choose a celebrity partner. Afterwards Lusin chose Mathias Mester as her celebrity partner.

Due to a COVID-19 infection, Joachim Llambi was replaced by last year's winner Rúrik Gíslason.

Key
Celebrity won immunity from the first elimination

The Team dances

Order	Celebrity	Dance	Music	Judge's Scores			Total
Order	Celebrity	Dance	Music	González	Mabuse	Gíslason	Total
1	René Casselly	Cha-cha-cha	"Bongo Cha Cha Cha (Summer Anthem)" - El Profesor	6	6	7	19
1	Timur Ülker	Cha-cha-cha	"Bongo Cha Cha Cha (Summer Anthem)" - El Profesor	6	5	7	18
2	Caroline Bosbach	Viennese waltz	"I Put a Spell on You" - Annie Lennox	5	5	6	16
2	Lilly zu Sayn-Wittgenstein-Berleburg	Viennese waltz	"I Put a Spell on You" - Annie Lennox	5	4	5	14
3	Amira Pocher	Tango	"Fever" - Peggy Lee	7	6	8	21
3	Janin Ullmann	Tango	"Fever" - Peggy Lee	7	7	8	22
4	Michelle	Quickstep	"I Get a Kick Out of You" - Frank Sinatra	5	4	6	15
4	Mike Singer	Quickstep	"I Get a Kick Out of You" - Frank Sinatra	5	4	6	15
5	Cheyenne Ochsenknecht	Cha-cha-cha	"Out Out" - Joel Corry, Jax Jones, Charli XCX & Saweetie	5	4	4	13
5	Sarah Mangione	Cha-cha-cha	"Out Out" - Joel Corry, Jax Jones, Charli XCX & Saweetie	5	5	5	15
6	Hardy Krüger jr.	Tango	"Fade To Grey" - Visage	5	4	4	13
6	Riccardo Basile	Tango	"Fade To Grey" - Visage	5	5	5	15
7	Bastian Bielendorfer	Salsa	"A Banda (Ah Bahn-da)" - France Gall	3	3	4	10
7	Mathias Mester	Salsa	"A Banda (Ah Bahn-da)" - France Gall	4	6	6	16

=== Week 1 ===
Due to a COVID-19 infection, Hardy & Patricija were unable to perform. Under the rules of the show, they were given a bye to the following week.

Order	Couple	Dance	Music	Judge's Scores			Total	Result
Order	Couple	Dance	Music	González	Mabuse	Llambi	Total	Result
1	Timur & Malika	Quickstep	"Şımarık" - Tarkan	6	5	4	15	Safe
2	Lilly & Andrzej	Cha-cha-cha	"Waiting for a Star to Fall" - Boy Meets Girl	5	4	2	11	Eliminated
3	René & Kathrin	Waltz	"No Time to Die" - Billie Eilish	7	7	5	19	Safe
4	Cheyenne & Evgeny	Quickstep	"Strip" - Lena	7	7	6	20	Safe
5	Sarah & Vadim	Tango	"Toxic" - Britney Spears	6	6	4	16	Safe
6	Michelle & Christian	Tango	"Disturbia" - Rihanna	6	6	5	17	Safe
7	Bastian & Ekaterina	Quickstep	"Millionär" - Die Prinzen	4	3	1	8	Bottom two
8	Caroline & Valentin	Quickstep	"Cheek to Cheek" - Tony Bennett and Lady Gaga	6	5	4	15	Safe
9	Janin & Zsolt	Cha-cha-cha	"Hung Up" - Madonna	7	6	7	20	Safe
10	Mike & Christina	Salsa	"Felices Los 4" - Maluma and Marc Anthony	4	4	2	10	Safe
11	Mathias & Renata	Cha-cha-cha	"Giant" - Calvin Harris and Rag'n'Bone Man	7	7	7	21	Safe
12	Riccardo & Isabel	Viennese waltz	"Se bastasse una canzone" - Eros Ramazzoti	6	5	2	13	Bottom three
13	Amira & Massimo	Salsa	"Sedúceme" - La India	5	5	4	14	Immune

=== Week 2: "Born in ..." ===
The couples danced one unlearned dance to a song that came out the year the celebrities were born.

Due to his ongoing COVID-19 infection, Hardy Krüger jr. had to leave the show. Lilly zu Sayn-Wittgenstein-Berleburg, who was eliminated in the last show, returned to the competition.

Andrzej Cibis and Malika Dzumaev also tested positive for COVID-19 and where replaced by Jimmie Surles and Patricija Ionel.

Due to a cold, Bastian & Ekaterina were unable to perform. They were given a bye to the following week.

Order	Couple	Dance	Music	Judge's Scores			Total	Result
Order	Couple	Dance	Music	González	Mabuse	Llambi	Total	Result
1	Michelle & Christian	Cha-cha-cha	"Eine neue Liebe" - Jürgen Marcus	4	4	3	11	Safe
2	Caroline & Valentin	Salsa	"Deseándote" - Frankie Ruiz	4	4	3	11	Safe
3	Sarah & Vadim	Viennese waltz	"What's a Woman?" - Vaya Con Dios	8	7	7	22	Safe
4	Mike & Christina	Cha-cha-cha	"Summer Jam" - The Underdog Project and Alle Farben	6	6	5	17	Safe
5	René & Kathrin	Paso doble	"Insomnia" - Faithless	8	8	7	23	Safe
6	Lilly & Jimmie	Rumba	"Heart of Gold" - Neil Young	3	3	1	7	Safe
7	Amira & Massimo	Foxtrot	"Everytime We Touch" - Maggie Reilly	6	6	5	17	Safe
8	Riccardo & Isabel	Jive	"The One and Only" - Chesney Hawkes	6	5	4	15	Bottom three
9	Timur & Patricija	Rumba	"Right Here Waiting" - Richard Marx	4	4	3	11	Bottom two
10	Janin & Zsolt	Jive	"Kids in America" - Kim Wilde	8	7	7	22	Safe
11	Cheyenne & Evgeny	Rumba	"She's Got That Light" - Orange Blue	6	5	4	15	Eliminated
12	Mathias & Renata	Paso doble	"The Final Countdown" - Europe	9	8	8	25	Safe

=== Week 3 ===
Due to a COVID-19 infection, Caroline & Valentin and Timur & Malika were unable to perform. They were given a bye to the following week.

Due to his ongoing COVID-19 infection, Andrzej Cibis could not return as dance partner for Lilly zu Sayn-Wittgenstein-Berleburg. She was supposed to continue the show with Robert Beitsch. Since she was also tested positive, she was unable to perform and was given a bye to the following week as well.

No elimination took place. As the winners of the evening, René & Kathrin received a bonus jury ranking point for the following show.

Order	Couple	Dance	Music	Judge's Scores			Total
Order	Couple	Dance	Music	González	Mabuse	Llambi	Total
1	Riccardo & Isabel	Cha-cha-cha	"Katchi" - Ofenbach and Nick Waterhouse	6	6	5	17
2	Mike & Christina	Charleston	"Englishman in New York" - Sting	7	7	5	19
3	Amira & Massimo	Rumba	"Havana" - Camila Cabello	8	7	6	21
4	Michelle & Christian	Waltz	"Open Arms" - Mariah Carey	6	5	3	14
5	Sarah & Vadim	Cha-cha-cha	"Dopamine" - Purple Disco Machine & Eyelar	7	7	6	20
6	René & Kathrin	Quickstep	"It Don't Mean A Thing" - Duke Ellington	10	10	9	29
7	Mathias & Renata	Waltz	"If I Were A Painting" - Kenny Rogers	8	7	6	21
8	Bastian & Ekaterina	Cha-cha-cha	"Sexy and I Know It" - LMFAO	3	3	1	7
9	Janin & Zsolt	Contemporary	"Stone Cold" - Demi Lovato	10	10	10	30

=== Week 4 ===
Due to a COVID-19 infection Kathrin Menzinger was replaced by Regina Luca. A double elimination took place.

Order	Couple	Dance	Music	Judge's Scores			Total	Result
Order	Couple	Dance	Music	González	Mabuse	Llambi	Total	Result
1	Amira & Massimo	Jive	"The Boy Does Nothing" - Alesha Dixon	8	8	6	22	Safe
2	Lilly & Andrzej	Quickstep	"Two Princes" - Spin Doctors	6	6	4	16	Eliminated
3	Mike & Christina	Viennese waltz	"Ich lebe für dich" - Teesy	6	6	3	15	Safe
4	Riccardo & Isabel	Salsa	"Toro Mata" - Celia Cruz and Johnny Pacheco	5	6	2	13	Eliminated
5	Sarah & Vadim	Contemporary	"Control" - Zoe Wees	10	10	10	30	Safe
6	Michelle & Christian	Jive	"Ohne Krimi geht die Mimi nie ins Bett" - Bill Ramsey	7	7	5	19	Safe
7	Timur & Malika	Tango	"Asi Se Baila el Tango" - Adriana Varela	9	8	7	24	Safe
8	Mathias & Renata	Salsa	"Jump in the Line (Shake, Señora)" - Harry Belafonte	10	10	9	29	Safe
9	Bastian & Ekaterina	Charleston	"Pinky and the Brain theme" - from Pinky and the Brain	4	4	1	9	Bottom three
10	Caroline & Valentin	Tango	"Be My Baby" - Vanessa Paradis	6	6	4	16	Bottom four
11	Janin & Zsolt	Samba	"Moi Je Joue" - Brigitte Bardot	9	8	9	26	Safe
12	René & Regina	Rumba	"Photograph" - Ed Sheeran	9	9	8	26	Safe
Boys vs Girls Battle
1	Team Boys	Freestyle	"Eye of the Tiger" - Survivor "It's Tricky" - Run-D.M.C. "Hollaback Girl" - Gwen Stefani "I Like To Move It" - Reel 2 Real, The Mad Stuntan and Erick Morillo "Who Let the Dogs Out" - Baha Men "Gangnam Style" - PSY	8				The Boys won the Boys vs Girls Battle
2	Team Girls	Freestyle	"Eye of the Tiger" - Survivor "It's Tricky" - Run-D.M.C. "Hollaback Girl" - Gwen Stefani "I Like To Move It" - Reel 2 Real, The Mad Stuntan and Erick Morillo "Who Let the Dogs Out" - Baha Men "Gangnam Style" - PSY	7				The Boys won the Boys vs Girls Battle

=== Week 5: "Made in Germany" ===
The couples danced one unlearned dance to German music.

Due to COVID-19 infections, René & Kathrin were unable to perform and Renata Lusin was replaced by Patricija Ionel. René & Kathrin were given a bye to the following week. Host Daniel Hartwich also tested positive and was replaced by Jan Köppen.

Order	Couple	Dance	Music	Judge's Scores			Total	Result
Order	Couple	Dance	Music	González	Mabuse	Llambi	Total	Result
1	Timur & Malika	Cha-cha-cha	"In Your Arms" - Topic, Robin Schulz, Nico Santos and Paul Van Dyk	7	7	6	20	Safe
2	Caroline & Valentin	Foxtrot	"Du trägst keine Liebe in dir" - Echt	5	5	4	14	Eliminated
3	Sarah & Vadim	Jive	"Elektrisches Gefühl" - Juli	8	7	6	21	Safe
4	Amira & Massimo	Contemporary	"Dein ist mein ganzes Herz" - Heinz Rudolf Kunze	8	8	9	25	Safe
5	Michelle & Christian	Rumba	"Ohne dich" - Münchener Freiheit	6	6	4	16	Bottom two
6	Mathias & Patricija	Charleston	"Mein kleiner grüner Kaktus" - Max Raabe	9	9	7	25	Safe
7	Bastian & Ekaterina	Foxtrot	"Frauen regier'n die Welt" - Roger Cicero	5	5	3	13	Bottom three
8	Mike & Christina	Quickstep	"Verdammt ich lieb' dich" - Matthias Reim	8	8	7	23	Safe
9	Janin & Zsolt	Waltz	"Das Beste" - Silbermond	10	9	9	28	Safe

=== Week 6 ===
Due to back problems, Michelle had to withdraw from the show. Caroline Bosbach, who was eliminated in the last show, returned to the competition.

Order	Couple	Dance	Music	Judge's Scores			Total	Result
Order	Couple	Dance	Music	González	Mabuse	Llambi	Total	Result
1	Timur & Malika	Jive	"Gambling Man" - The Overtones	9	9	8	26	Safe
2	Mathias & Renata	Rumba	"You're Beautiful" - James Blunt	6	6	4	16	Safe
3	Sarah & Vadim	Foxtrot	"Can't Smile Without You" - Barry Manilow	8	8	7	23	Bottom two
4	Janin & Zsolt	Salsa	"Salsa" - Yuri Buenaventura	9	10	10	29	Safe
5	Caroline & Valentin	Waltz	"People Help the People" - Birdy	6	6	4	16	Eliminated
6	Amira & Massimo	Charleston	"Yes Sir, That's My Baby" - from Yes Sir, That's My Baby	10	10	10	30	Safe
7	Mike & Christina	Contemporary	"It'll Be Okay" - Shawn Mendes	8	9	9	26	Bottom three
8	Bastian & Ekaterina	Tango	"Mission: Impossible" - from Mission: Impossible	6	6	5	17	Safe
9	René & Kathrin	Samba	"It's Not Unusual" - Tom Jones	7	7	6	20	Safe

=== Week 7: "Love Week" ===
The couples performed one unlearned dance to love songs and a team dance coached by one of the three judges. To avoid favoritism, the judges did not score the couples they coached, so the team dances received a total score out of 20 instead of the usual 30 points.

Order	Couple	Dance	Music	Judge's Scores			Total	Result
Order	Couple	Dance	Music	González	Mabuse	Llambi	Total	Result
1	Mike & Christina	Jive	"Runaway Baby" - Bruno Mars	7	8	7	22	Bottom three
2	Amira & Massimo	Waltz	"Say Something" - A Great Big World and Christina Aguilera	8	8	6	22	Bottom two
3	Mathias & Renata	Jive	"Everybody Needs Somebody to Love" - The Blues Brothers	9	9	8	26	Safe
4	Bastian & Ekaterina	Rumba	"I Just Called to Say I Love You" - Stevie Wonder	6	6	5	17	Safe
5	Sarah & Vadim	Salsa	"Tu amor" - Luis Fonsi	8	8	6	22	Safe
6	Timur & Malika	Viennese waltz	"Sex on Fire" - Kings of Leon	7	7	5	19	Eliminated
7	Janin & Zsolt	Charleston	"Bei mir bist du schön" - The Andrews Sisters	10	10	10	30	Safe
8	René & Kathrin	Tango	"Assassin's Tango" - John Powell	10	10	10	30	Safe
Team Battle
1	Sarah & Vadim; Timur & Malika; Janin & Zsolt	Freestyle (Team González)	"Moon River" - Audrey Hepburn "Por Una Cabeza" - Carlos Gardel "Mambo No. 5" - Pérez Prado	X	9	10	19	All three teams won the Team Battle
2	Mathias & Renata; René & Kathrin	Freestyle (Team Mabuse)	"Cry Me a River" - Michael Bublé "Higher" - Michael Bublé "It Had Better Be Tonight" - Michael Bublé	9	X	10	19	All three teams won the Team Battle
3	Mike & Christina; Amira & Massimo; Bastian & Ekaterina	Freestyle (Team Llambi)	"Sag mir quando, sag mir wann" - Dieter Thomas Kuhn "Über den Wolken" - Dieter Thomas Kuhn "Griechischer Wein" - Dieter Thomas Kuhn "Fiesta Mexicana" - Dieter Thomas Kuhn	9	10	X	19	All three teams won the Team Battle

=== Week 8 ===
The couples performed one unlearned dance and competed in the discofox marathon. Viewers were able to vote for the songs online.

Order	Couple	Dance	Music	Judge's Scores			Total	Result
Order	Couple	Dance	Music	González	Mabuse	Llambi	Total	Result
1	Mike & Christina	Tango	"Tell It to My Heart" - MEDUZA feat. Hozier	7	8	7	22	Eliminated
2	Amira & Massimo	Cha-cha-cha	"Kiss" - Prince	8	8	7	23	Safe
3	Mathias & Renata	Foxtrot	"For Once in My Life" - Stevie Wonder	7	7	6	20	Safe
4	Sarah & Vadim	Quickstep	"Fascination" - Alphabeat	8	8	6	22	Safe
5	Bastian & Ekaterina	Paso doble	"Toreador Song" - from Carmen	6	6	4	16	Bottom two
6	René & Kathrin	Salsa	"Iboru Iboya" - La Maxima 79	9	9	8	26	Safe
7	Janin & Zsolt	Quickstep	"Another Day of Sun" - from La La Land	10	10	10	30	Safe
Discofox Marathon
	Mike & Christina; Bastian & Ekaterina; Sarah & Vadim; René & Kathrin; Amira & Massimo; Janin & Zsolt; Mathias & Renata	Discofox	"Einfach Hello" - Maite Kelly "Jetzt oder nie" - Helene Fischer "Der Wellerman Song" - Buddy, Markus Becker and Voxxclub "Cordula Grün" - Josh. "Die Nacht von Freitag auf Montag" - Peter Wackel "An die Wand" - Dicht und Doof "Partyanimal" - Micha von der Rampe	1; 2; 3; 4; 6; 8; 10				Mathias & Renata won the Discofox Marathon

=== Week 9: "Magic Moments" ===
The couples performed a freestyle to celebrate their magic moment in life and competeted in a dance duel.

Order	Couple	Dance	Music	Judge's Scores			Total	Result
Order	Couple	Dance	Music	González	Mabuse	Llambi	Total	Result
1	Bastian & Ekaterina	Freestyle	"We Will Rock You" - Queen/ "Experience" - Ludovico Einaudi	5	5	3	13	Eliminated
2	Mathias & Renata	Freestyle	"River Flows In You" - Yiruma/ "Mach dich groß" - Seelemann	8	8	6	22	Bottom three
3	Sarah & Vadim	Freestyle	"Neuanfang" - Clueso/ "Midnight City" - M83/ "Roar" - Katy Perry	8	8	6	22	Bottom two
4	Amira & Massimo	Freestyle	"Papaoutai" - Stromae	10	10	10	30	Safe
5	René & Kathrin	Freestyle	"Human" - Rag'n'Bone Man	10	10	10	30	Safe
6	Janin & Zsolt	Freestyle	"You've Got the Love" - Florence and the Machine	10	10	10	30	Safe
Dance Duels
1	Sarah & Vadim	Bachata	"Obsesión" - Aventura	9	9	8	26	Sarah & Vadim won the Dance Duel
1	Amira & Massimo	Bachata	"Obsesión" - Aventura	9	9	7	25	Sarah & Vadim won the Dance Duel
2	Bastian & Ekaterina	Street	"Shape of You" - Major Lazer feat. Nyla & Kranium	5	5	3	13	Mathias & Renata won the Dance Duel
2	Mathias & Renata	Street	"Shape of You" - Major Lazer feat. Nyla & Kranium	7	7	6	20	Mathias & Renata won the Dance Duel
3	René & Kathrin	Lindy hop	"I Need You" - Jon Batiste	10	10	10	30	The couples tied in the Dance Duel
3	Janin & Zsolt	Lindy hop	"I Need You" - Jon Batiste	10	10	10	30	The couples tied in the Dance Duel

=== Week 10: Quarter-final ===
The couples performed one unlearned dance in round one and a trio dance with another professional partner in round two.

Order	Couple	Dance	Music	Judge's Scores			Total	Result
Order	Couple	Dance	Music	González	Mabuse	Llambi	Total	Result
1	Sarah & Vadim (with Malika Dzumaev)	Charleston	"We No Speak Americano" - Yolanda Be Cool & DCUP	8	8	6	22	Eliminated
6	Sarah & Vadim (with Malika Dzumaev)	Rumba	"Don't Be So Shy" - Imany	9	8	8	25	Eliminated
2	Amira & Massimo (with Andrzej Cibis)	Paso doble	"Lux Aeterna" - from Requiem for a Dream	10	9	9	28	Bottom two
7	Amira & Massimo (with Andrzej Cibis)	Samba	"Shake Your Bon-Bon" - Ricky Martin	8	8	7	23	Bottom two
3	René & Kathrin (with Valentin Lusin)	Jive	"Jailhouse Rock" - Elvis Presley	8	8	7	23	Safe
8	René & Kathrin (with Valentin Lusin)	Foxtrot	"Come Fly With Me" - Frank Sinatra	10	10	10	30	Safe
4	Mathias & Renata (with Christina Luft)	Tango	"Seven Nation Army" - The White Stripes	9	9	8	26	Safe
9	Mathias & Renata (with Christina Luft)	Samba	"Cuban Pete" - Desi Arnaz	9	9	9	27	Safe
5	Janin & Zsolt (with Evgeny Vinokurov)	Foxtrot	"Call Me" - Blondie	10	10	10	30	Safe
10	Janin & Zsolt (with Evgeny Vinokurov)	Tango	"Für Elise" - Ludwig van Beethoven	10	10	10	30	Safe

=== Week 11: Semi-final ===
The couples will perform two unlearned dances and an Impro dance ("Impro Dance Even NOCH More Extreme"). The specific dance style, music and costumes for the Impro dance will be given to the couples only three minutes before their performance.

Order	Couple	Dance	Music	Judge's Scores			Total	Result
Order	Couple	Dance	Music	González	Mabuse	Llambi	Total	Result
1	Amira & Massimo	Quickstep	"Valerie" - Amy Winehouse	8	9	6	23	Eliminated
5	Amira & Massimo	Tango	"Symphony No. 40" - Wolfgang Amadeus Mozart	10	9	9	28	Eliminated
9	Amira & Massimo	Foxtrot	"Habits" - Tove Lo	8	8	6	22	Eliminated
2	Janin & Zsolt	Paso doble	"Aroul" - Taalbi Brothers	10	9	7	26	Safe
6	Janin & Zsolt	Rumba	"Arráncame" - Vanessa Martín	10	10	10	30	Safe
10	Janin & Zsolt	Waltz	"Against All Odds (Take a Look at Me Now)" - Phil Collins	9	8	7	24	Safe
3	Mathias & Renata	Contemporary	"Perfectly Impferfect" - Declan Donovan	8	9	7	24	Bottom two
7	Mathias & Renata	Quickstep	"You Can't Hurry Love" - Phil Collins	10	10	9	29	Bottom two
11	Mathias & Renata	Jive	"When the Rain Begins to Fall" - Jermaine Jackson and Pia Zadora	7	7	5	19	Bottom two
4	René & Kathrin	Charleston	"Charleston" - Sam Levine	10	10	8	28	Safe
8	René & Kathrin	Contemporary	"Silhouette" - Aquilo	10	10	9	29	Safe
12	René & Kathrin	Salsa	"Hot Hot Hot" - Arrow	9	10	8	27	Safe

=== Week 12: Final ===
Order	Couple	Dance	Music	Judge's Scores			Total	Result
Order	Couple	Dance	Music	González	Mabuse	Llambi	Total	Result
1	Janin & Zsolt	Cha-cha-cha	"Habia Cavour" - La Maxima 79	9	9	9	27	Runner-up
4	Janin & Zsolt	Contemporary	"Stone Cold" - Demi Lovato	10	10	9	29	Runner-up
7	Janin & Zsolt	Freestyle	Medley from Burlesque - "Express" & "Show Me How You Burlesque" - Christina Aguilera/"Welcome to Burlesque" - Cher	10	10	10	30	Runner-up
2	Mathias & Renata	Rumba	"It Must Have Been Love" - Roxette	8	8	8	24	Third place
5	Mathias & Renata	Paso doble	"The Final Countdown" - Europe	10	10	10	30	Third place
8	Mathias & Renata	Freestyle	Medley from The Smurfs	10	10	10	30	Third place
3	René & Kathrin	Cha-cha-cha	"Cake By The Ocean" - DNCE	9	9	10	28	Winner
6	René & Kathrin	Tango	"Assassin's Tango" - John Powell	10	10	10	30	Winner
9	René & Kathrin	Freestyle	"Pushin' On" - 2WEI feat. Marvin Brooks / "Stole the Show" - Kygo feat. Parson James	10	10	10	30	Winner

== Dance chart ==
Highest scoring dance
Lowest scoring dance
Not performed due to illness or injury
Couple withdrew that week

Couple	Launch show	Week 1	Week 2	Week 3	Week 4		Week 5	Week 6	Week 7		Week 8		Week 9		Week 10		Week 11			Week 12		
René & Kathrin	Cha-cha-cha	Waltz	Paso doble	Quickstep	Rumba	Freestyle	—	Samba	Tango	Freestyle	Salsa	Discofox	Freestyle	Lindy hop	Jive	Foxtrot	Charleston	Contemporary	Salsa	Cha-cha-cha	Tango	Freestyle
Janin & Zsolt	Tango	Cha-cha-cha	Jive	Contemporary	Samba	Freestyle	Waltz	Salsa	Charleston	Freestyle	Quickstep	Discofox	Freestyle	Lindy hop	Foxtrot	Tango	Paso doble	Rumba	Waltz	Cha-cha-cha	Contemporary	Freestyle
Mathias & Renata	Salsa	Cha-cha-cha	Paso doble	Waltz	Salsa	Freestyle	Charleston	Rumba	Jive	Freestyle	Foxtrot	Discofox	Freestyle	Street	Tango	Samba	Contemporary	Quickstep	Jive	Rumba	Paso doble	Freestyle
Amira & Massimo	Tango	Salsa	Foxtrot	Rumba	Jive	Freestyle	Contemporary	Charleston	Waltz	Freestyle	Cha-cha-cha	Discofox	Freestyle	Bachata	Paso doble	Samba	Quickstep	Tango	Foxtrot			
Sarah & Vadim	Cha-cha-cha	Tango	Viennese waltz	Cha-cha-cha	Contemporary	Freestyle	Jive	Foxtrot	Salsa	Freestyle	Quickstep	Discofox	Freestyle	Bachata	Charleston	Rumba						
Bastian & Ekaterina	Salsa	Quickstep	Rumba	Cha-cha-cha	Charleston	Freestyle	Foxtrot	Tango	Rumba	Freestyle	Paso doble	Discofox	Freestyle	Street								
Mike & Christina	Quickstep	Salsa	Cha-cha-cha	Charleston	Viennese waltz	Freestyle	Quickstep	Contemporary	Jive	Freestyle	Tango	Discofox										
Timur & Malika	Cha-cha-cha	Quickstep	Rumba	—	Tango	Freestyle	Cha-cha-cha	Jive	Viennese waltz	Freestyle												
Caroline & Valentin	Viennese waltz	Quickstep	Salsa	—	Tango	Freestyle	Foxtrot	Waltz														
Michelle & Christian	Quickstep	Tango	Cha-cha-cha	Waltz	Jive	Freestyle	Rumba	Quickstep														
Lilly & Andrzej	Viennese waltz	Cha-cha-cha	Rumba	—	Quickstep	Freestyle																
Riccardo & Isabel	Tango	Viennese waltz	Jive	Cha-cha-cha	Salsa	Freestyle																
Cheyenne & Evgeny	Cha-cha-cha	Quickstep	Rumba																			
Hardy & Patricija	Tango	—	—																			

- Launch show: Cha-cha-cha, Quickstep, Salsa, Tango or Viennese waltz
- Week 1: One unlearned dance (introducing Waltz)
- Week 2: One unlearned dance (introducing Jive, Rumba, Foxtrot and Paso doble)
- Week 3: One unlearned dance (introducing Charleston and Contemporary)
- Week 4: One unlearned dance (introducing Samba) and Freestyle (Boys vs Girls Battle)
- Week 5: One unlearned dance
- Week 6: One unlearned dance
- Week 7: One unlearned dance and Freestyle (Team Battle)
- Week 8: One unlearned dance and Discofox (Discofox Marathon)
- Week 9: Freestyle and Dance Duel (introducing Lindy hop, Street and Bachata)
- Week 10: One unlearned dance and Trio Dance
- Week 11: Two unlearned dances and Impro Dance Even NOCH More Extreme (Semi-Finals)
- Week 12: Dance chosen by the judges, favourite dance and Freestyle (Finals)
