= Mike Singer =

German singer

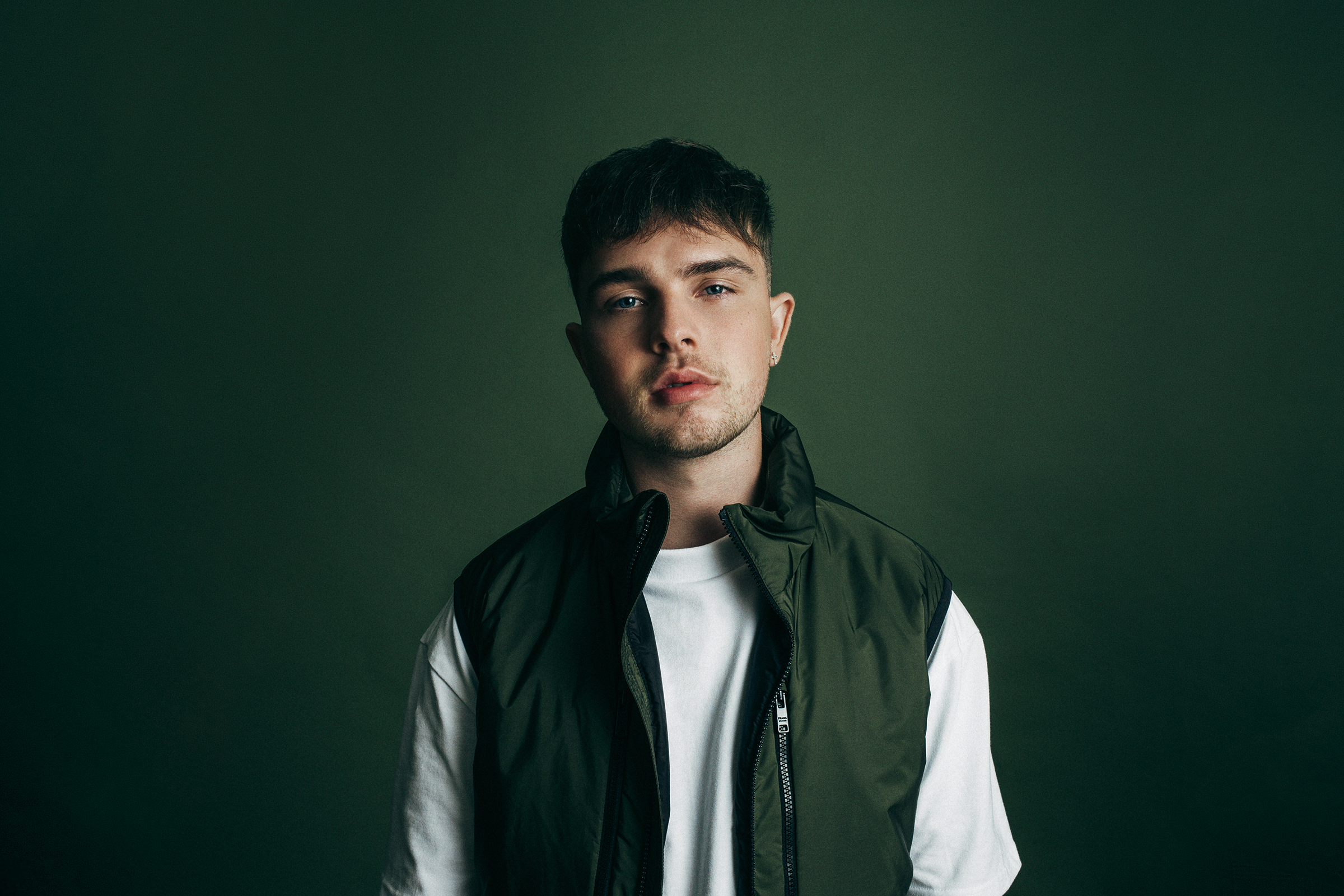

Background information
- Born: 20 January 2000 (age 25); Kehl, Baden-Württemberg, Germany
- Genres: Pop
- Occupation(s): Singer, songwriter
- Instrument: Vocals
- Years active: 2012–present
- Labels: Warner Music
- Website: www.mikesinger.de

Mike Singer (born 20 January 2000 in Kehl, Baden-Württemberg) is a German pop singer and songwriter.

== Biography ==
Growing up as the son of Russian German parents in Offenburg, Singer started to develop a musical career from the age of twelve. Self-taught, he composed and wrote self-produced songs at home and cover of well-known hits. In 2013, he auditioned for the German version of The Voice Kids joining Team Lena Meyer-Landrut, but was voted out following the Battle Round.

In 2014, he released the album Only You mostly in English, but with an additional track in German and 2 remixes. In 2015 (following continued online success), he released his EP Nur mit Dir with 6 tracks in German. He has attracted over 1.4 million fans on Instagram, 360,000 followers on Facebook and over 580,000 subscribers to his YouTube channel.

He was signed to Warner Music Group in February 2017, and both his first album on the label Karma and the follow-up album Deja Vu in January 2018 have both reached number 1 on the German Albums Chart, as well as charting in Austria and Switzerland. The German newspaper Die Welt called him the German Justin Bieber. In 2017, he also appeared in the series Spotlight in the role of Luke.

== Discography ==
=== Studio albums ===
List of studio albums, with selected chart positions and track listing
Title	Album details	Peak chart positions			Track listing
Title	Album details	GER	AUT	SWI	Track listing
Karma	Released: February 24, 2017; Label: Warner; Formats: CD, digital download, streaming	1	5	12	No. / Title / Length; 1. / "Intro" / 1:12; 2. / "Karma" / 3:17; 3. / "Flieh mit mir" / 3:26; 4. / "Wenn all die Sorgen gehen" / 3:36; 5. / "Herz für dich" / 3:04; 6. / "Jung und frei" / 3:04; 7. / "Nein" / 2:44; 8. / "Hilf mir" / 3:15; 9. / "Egal" / 3:52; 10. / "Alien" / 2:59; 11. / "Alles nur gelogen" / 3:07; 12. / "Weinst du" / 4:25; 13. / "1Life" / 3:10; 14. / "Homies und Groupies" / 3:03; 15. / "Bring mich zum Singen" / 3:28; 16. / "Fanpost" / 2:53
Deja Vu	Released: January 19, 2018; Label: Warner; Formats: CD, digital download, streaming	1	2	2	No. / Title / Length; 1. / "Unendliche Geschichte" / 3:09; 2. / "Galaxie" (featuring Sierra Kidd) / 3:29; 3. / "Bester Tag" / 2:52; 4. / "Alles an dir" (featuring Kay One) / 3:04; 5. / "Vergessen wie du heißt" / 2:50; 6. / "Zwei Seiten" / 3:45; 7. / "Safe Digga" / 2:54; 8. / "Stage" / 3:15; 9. / "Singer" / 2:55; 10. / "Home Sweet Home" / 3:02; 11. / "Deja Vu" / 3:11; 12. / "Fantasie" (featuring Teesy) / 3:56; 13. / "Phänomen" / 3:19; 14. / "Flashbacks" / 2:57; 15. / "Nie mehr ohne dich" / 3:01; 16. / "An deiner Seite" / 3:34; 17. / "Hundert Prozent" / 2:52; 18. / "Meine Crew" / 3:04
Trip	Released: April 12, 2019; Label: Warner; Formats: CD, digital download, streaming	1	5	14	No. / Title / Length; 1. / "Trip" / 2:33; 2. / "Taub" / 2:51; 3. / "Tinderella" / 2:33; 4. / "Sei ehrlich" / 2:31; 5. / "Air Force One" / 3:61; 6. / "Bon Voyage" / 2:53; 7. / "Bonnie ohne Kleid" / 2:56; 8. / "Ulala" (featuring Eunique) / 3:05; 9. / "Da wo wir sind" / 3:17; 10. / "Bon Bon" / 2:40; 11. / "Warum" / 2:36; 12. / "Durch die Nacht" / 3:25
Paranoid!?	Released: November 20, 2020; Label: Warner; Formats: CD, digital download, streaming	9	42	—	No. / Title / Length; 1. / "Nie mehr" / 2:33; 2. / "High" / 2:48; 3. / "BYE" / 2:21; 4. / "Panik" / 2:29; 5. / "Paranoid" / 2:42; 6. / "Hau Ab" / 2:31; 7. / "100Tausend" / 2:50; 8. / "La La La" / 2:29; 9. / "Blackout" / 2:22; 10. / "Gänsehaut" / 2:17; 11. / "Immer Schlimmer" / 2:32; 12. / "Outro" / 2:40
Emotions	Released: April 14, 2022; Label: Universal; Formats: CD, digital download, streaming	1	—	—	No. / Title / Length; 1. / "Tanzen ohne Beat (MADIZIN MIX)" / 2:26; 2. / "Bonjour Ca Va" / 2:14; 3. / "Lass mich los" (with KAYEF) / 2:27; 4. / "Blind oder Taub" / 2:14; 5. / "Verdammt ich lieb' dich" / 2:56; 6. / "Warum bist du so" (with Dardan) / 2:42; 7. / "Emotions in Dessous" / 3:01; 8. / "Wie viel Lügen" (featuring FOURTY) / 2:16; 9. / "Forever Young" / 2:15; 10. / "Fehler" (with Monet192) / 2:07; 11. / "Als ob du mich liebst" (featuring Vanessa Mai) / 2:21; 12. / "Parkbank" / 2:36; 13. / "Licht" / 2:44
Rush	Released: April 5, 2024; Label: Universal; Formats: CD, digital download, streaming	—	—	—	No. / Title / Length; 3. / "Brich mir nicht mein Herz" / 2:36; 5. / "Sex On The Beach" / 2:04; 7. / "Adrenalin" / 2:52; 9. / "Zielen gelernt" (with FOURTY) / 2:23
"—" denotes a recording that did not chart or was not released in that territory.

=== Extended plays ===
List of EPs, with release date, label and track listing shown
Title
Nur mit Dir
EP details
- Released: October 2, 2015
- Label: Gefälltmir Media
- Formats: Digital download, streaming
Track listing

No.	Title	Length
1.	"Frei sein"	3.47
2.	"Abbild"	3.23
3.	"Mein Herz" (featuring Ado Kojo)	3:40
4.	"Weiter gehen"	2.56
5.	"Nur mit dir"	3.33
6.	"Ohne dich"	3:51

=== Singles ===
List of singles, with selected chart positions, showing year released and album name
Title	Year	Peak chart positions			Album
Title	Year	GER	AUT	SWI	Album
"Karma"	2016	73	64	—	Karma
"Jung und frei"	2017	—	—	—	Karma
"Nein"	2017	—	—	—	Karma
"Deja Vu"	2017	65	56	—	Deja Vu
"Galaxie" (featuring Sierra Kidd)	2017	—	—	—	Deja Vu
"Netflix & Chill" (Kay One featuring Mike Singer)	2018	11	15	54	Makers Gonna Make
"Bella ciao"	2018	44	59	80	Non-album single
"Safe Digga" (featuring Slimane)	2018	—	—	—	Deja Vu
"Taub"	2018	—	—	—	Trip
"Bon Voyage"	2019	—	—	—	Trip
"Ulalala" (featuring Eunique)	2019	—	—	—	Trip
"Bon Bon" (featuring Ado Kojo)	2019	—	—	—	Non-album single
"Paranoid"	2020	—	—	—	Paranoid!?
"100Tausend"	2020	—	—	—	Paranoid!?
"Bye"	2020	—	—	—	Paranoid!?
"Panik"	2020	—	—	—	Paranoid!?
"Verdammt ich lieb' dich"	2021	28	51	100	Emotions
"Forever Young"	2021	—	—	—	Emotions
"Bonjour ca va"	2021	—	—	—	Emotions
"Als ob du mich liebst" (featuring Vanessa Mai)	2021	—	—	—	Emotions
"Lass mich los" (featuring Kayef)	2022	75	—	—	Emotions
"Fehler" (featuring Monet192)	2022	75	—	—	Emotions
"Tanzen ohne Beat (Madizin Mix)"	2022	—	—	—	Emotions
"Warum bist du so" (featuring Dardan)	2022	60	—	—	Emotions
"—" denotes a recording that did not chart or was not released in that territory.

== Filmography ==
- 2017: Spotlight (Online series) -- as Luke
- 2019: Der Lehrer—as Felix
- 2020: The Masked Singer—as Wuschel (Season 2 runner-up)
- 2021: Deutschland sucht den Superstar—Judge (Season 18)
- 2022: Let's Dance—Contestant (season 15)

== Awards ==
Year	Organisation	Award	Work	Result	Ref.
2018	MTV Europe Music Awards	Best German Act	Mike Singer	Won	
