= In der Weihnachtsbäckerei =

Song by Rolf Zuckowski

from the album Winterkinder
- Language: German
- Released: October 19, 1987
- Genre: Schlager music
- Length: 2:52

The Schlager music song "In der Weihnachtsbäckerei" (German: "In the Christmas bakery") is a German Christmas carol, written and composed by the musician Rolf Zuckowski.

== Content ==
"In der Weihnachtsbäckerei" describes the situation in a Christmas bakery, focusing on the mess made while baking.

The chorus talks of the tastes found in a Christmas bakery, while also adding the risks of creating a mess when mixing the ingredients. The chorus can be translated as following:

In der Weihnachtsbäckerei
Gibt es manche Leckerei
Zwischen Mehl und Milch
Macht so mancher Knilch
Eine riesengroße Kleckerei
In der Weihnachtsbäckerei
In der Weihnachtsbäckerei

Translation:

In the Christmas bakery
There are many treats
Between flour and milk
Some little rascal
Makes a huge mess
In the Christmas bakery
In the Christmas bakery

The chaos becomes more prominent as the first verse discovers, how the recipe has gone missing, concluding in a decision to improvise

Wo ist das Rezept geblieben
Von den Plätzchen, die wir lieben?
Wer hat das Rezept verschleppt?
"Ich nicht"
"Du vielleicht?"
"Ich auch nicht"

Na, dann müssen wir es packen
Einfach frei nach Schnauze backen
Schmeißt den Ofen an (oh ja)
Und ran

Translation:

Where did the recipe go
For the cookies that we love?
Who took the recipe away?
"Not me"
"Maybe you?"
"Me neither"

Well, then we have to do it
Just bake freely from the gut
Turn on the oven (oh yes)
And get to it

The second verse then goes on by listing the needed ingredients and adding them to the improvised dough:

Brauchen wir nicht Schokolade
Honig, Nüsse und Succade
Und ein bischen Zimt?
Das stimmt

Butter, Mehl und Milch verrühren
Zwischendurch einmal probieren
Und dann kommt das Ei (pass auf)
Vorbei

Translation:

Don't we need chocolate
Honey, nuts, and candied fruit
And a bit of cinnamon?
That's right

Mix butter, flour, and milk
Try it in between
And then comes the egg (watch out)
Done

The last verse then narrates the practice of kneading the dough, cut out the cookies, placing them on the baking sheet and waiting for them as they bake in the oven. Finally, they turn out burnt:

Bitte mal zur Seite treten
Denn wir brauchen Platz zum kneten
Sind die Finger rein?
Du Schwein

Sind die Plätzchen, die wir stechen
Erstmal auf den Ofenblechen
Warten wir gespannt
Verbrannt

Translation:

Please step aside
Because we need space for kneading
Are the fingers clean?
You pig

Are the cookies that we cut out
First on the baking sheets
We wait excitedly
Burned

Rolf Zuckowski thought of the song on a ride home from a concert after talking about baking cookies on a call with his family. His three year old son modified the melody when singing it, so that the last line of the chorus came to be the beginning of the song as well.

1987 Rolf Zuckowski's album Winterkinder (German: "Winter children"). In the same year, he played the song in the German TV-show Wetten, dass..?. It became widely known in Germany.

== Charts placement ==
Chart (2012–2025)	Peak position
Austrian Single Charts	28
German Single Charts	16

== Publications ==
Books

There are a picture book and a song book with illustrations by Julia Ginsbach:

- Rolf Zuckowski, Julia Ginsbach: In der Weihnachtsbäckerei. in: Bunte Liedergeschichten. Gerstenberg, Hildesheim 1996, ISBN 3-8067-4184-0.
- Rolf Zuckowski, Julia Ginsbach: In der Weihnachtsbäckerei. Coppenrath, Münster 2007, ISBN 3-8157-7858-1.

CD, Video und DVD

- Rolf Zuckowski und seine Freunde – Rolfs Liederkalender – Sing mit uns und Videoaufnahme der ZDF-Sendung 1992
- Rolf Zuckowski und seine Freunde – Das Beste aus dem ZDF, Universal Music Entertainment, Berlin 2004 (DVD)
- 2006 entstand ein gleichnamiger Fernsehfilm mit Rolf Zuckowski als er selbst
- Rolf Zuckowski: In der Weihnachtsbäckerei. – Doppel-CD, Universal Music Entertainment, Berlin 2012
- Rolf Zuckowski: Die Weihnachtsbäckerei – Das Musical-Hörspiel mit den Liedern von Rolf Zuckowski. Karussell (Universal Music) 2019

== Covers ==
- 1996: Niko & Rudi (Album: Schneeflöckchen – Weissröckchen)
- 2000: Wolfgang Petry (Album: Freudige Weihnachten)
- 2015: Helene Fischer & Royal Philharmonic Orchestra (Album: Weihnachten)
- 2016: Otto Waalkes
- 2024: Eizbrand - In der Weihnachtsbäckerei (Album: Rookies & Friends Vol. 3)
