= Bill Ramsey (singer) =

American-German jazz singer (1931–2021)

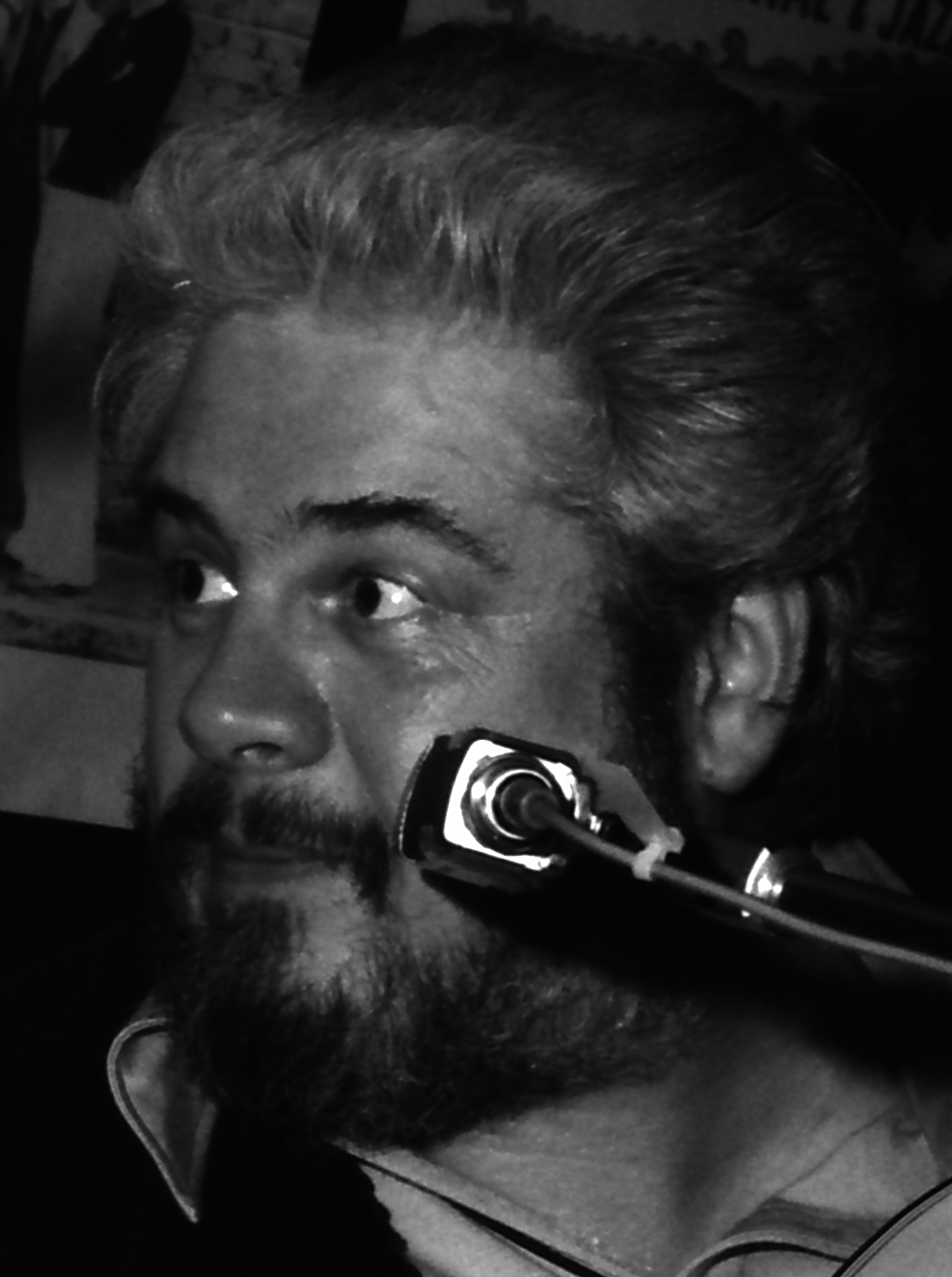
- Ramsey performing in 1977
- Born: William McCreery Ramsey; 17 April 1931; Cincinnati, Ohio, U.S.
- Died: 2 July 2021 (aged 90); Hamburg, Germany
- Education: Yale University
- Occupations: Jazz singer; Pop singer; Schlager singer; Journalist; Actor; Radio presenter; Lecturer
- Organizations: American Forces Network; Hessischer Rundfunk; Polydor
- Awards: Order of Merit of the Federal Republic of Germany

William McCreery Ramsey (17 April 1931 – 2 July 2021) was an American-German jazz and pop singer, journalist and actor famous for his German-language hits. He returned to Germany a year after he had served compulsory military service with the U.S. Air Force there. Active as a singer of jazz and pop already as a soldier, he made a career in different fields of musical entertainment. He sang and recorded German schlager, also German-language cover versions of English hits, jazz and swing. He appeared in films and television series, and ran popular series on radio and television as presenter.

== Biography ==
William McCreery Ramsey, called Bill, was born in Cincinnati, Ohio on 17 April 1931, the son of a teacher and an advertising manager for Procter & Gamble. In his youth, he sang in a college dance band. He began to study sociology and business from 1949 to 1951 at Yale University in New Haven and sang jazz, swing and blues in the evenings. His greatest influences were Count Basie, Nat King Cole, Duke Ellington and Louis Jordan. Due to the Korean War, compulsory military service was again introduced in the US and Ramsey served with the U.S. Air Force in Germany. During this time period, he appeared in clubs like the Jazz Cellar in Frankfurt. He was discovered by an employee of the American Forces Network (AFN), and hired to entertain troops. There Ramsey advanced to executive producer and though still in service, spent more time on appearances at festivals. As of 1953, he appeared with, among others, band leaders Ernst Mosch, Paul Kuhn, Kurt Edelhagen and James Last. The jazz pianist and music producer Heinz Gietz organized an appearance with Hessischer Rundfunk for Ramsey in 1955. There he did playback recordings for the musical film Liebe, Tanz und 1000 Schlager (Love, dance and 1000 hits) with Peter Alexander and Caterina Valente. Upon his discharge from the military in 1957, he continued his studies in the U.S. and returned to Frankfurt a year later.

Gietz took Ramsey under contract in 1958 and in the same year his first single with Polydor was released. It was a small but respectable success and launched the style, with which ”the man with the black voice” would land hits in the future. The music was oriented on the Anglo American pop music hits of that period. Among Ramsey's hits published in the 1950s and 1960s were German-language cover versions of Hank Ballard, The Beatles, Fats Domino, Ivory Joe Hunter, Roger Miller, Elvis Presley, Jimmie Rodgers, Andy Williams, Sheb Wooley and others. In addition, he performed numerous originals, which were composed almost exclusively by Gietz. The ironic lyrics of Kurt Feltz and Hans Bradtke often commented on current events.

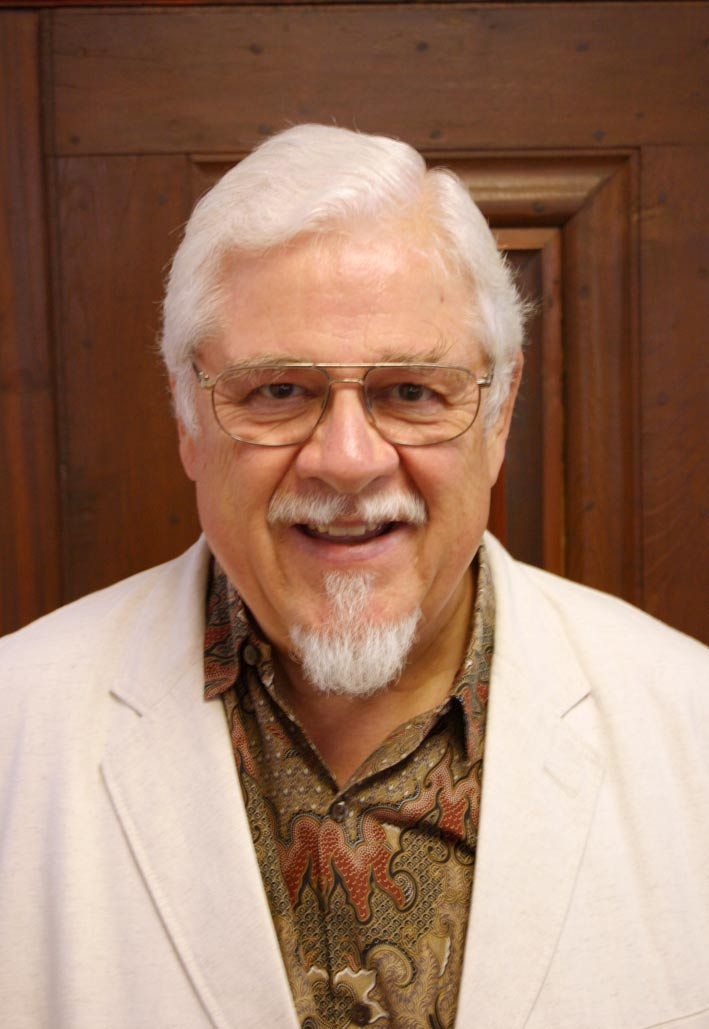
Ramsey in 2005

Ramsey and Gietz signed with Columbia label EMI Group in 1962, where they would continue their success. As beat music changed the market in the 1960s, Ramsey was a regular on the German charts. In the second half of the 1960s Ramsey took up predominantly English-language songs and dedicated himself again to jazz and blues. In this musically varied decade he presented operettas, musical and beat songs, as well as an LP with children's songs. Ramsey switched labels to Gietz's record company Cornet in 1966, and later in the same year to Polydor. He appeared on different labels in the 1970s.

Ramsey appeared regularly as a pop and jazz singer, mostly in duets with the guitarist Juraj Galan, with whom he released several albums. The duo's LP Live in the House of Commons won the German record critics prize. From the late 1980s, Ramsey presented Swingtime each Friday on Hessischer Rundfunk until 2019. In 2008 and 2009 he went on tour with Max Greger and Hugo Strasser as Swing legends.

He was a lecturer for many years at Hamburg University for Music and Performing Arts. He had a lead speaking role in the audio play for children Der kleine Tag in 1999.

=== Television ===
Ramsey's popularity led to numerous appearances in film and television, where he appeared as a singer and in comedy roles. Ramsey had numerous television appearances, acted in 28 films and toured through Europe, the US, and North Africa. He presented the television shows Hits for Schlappohren (1971) and Talentschuppen (Talent shed) (1974 to 1980), among others.

=== Personal ===
Ramsey lived for 20 years in Zürich, later in Wiesbaden, and from 1991 onward with his fourth wife Petra in Hamburg. He became a German citizen on 17 October 1984. His wife, a physician, also worked as his manager.

Ramsey died at his home in Hamburg at the age of 90 on 2 July 2021.

== Discography (selection) ==
Ramsey released 50 singles as well as 30 LPs and CDs, including:

=== Singles ===
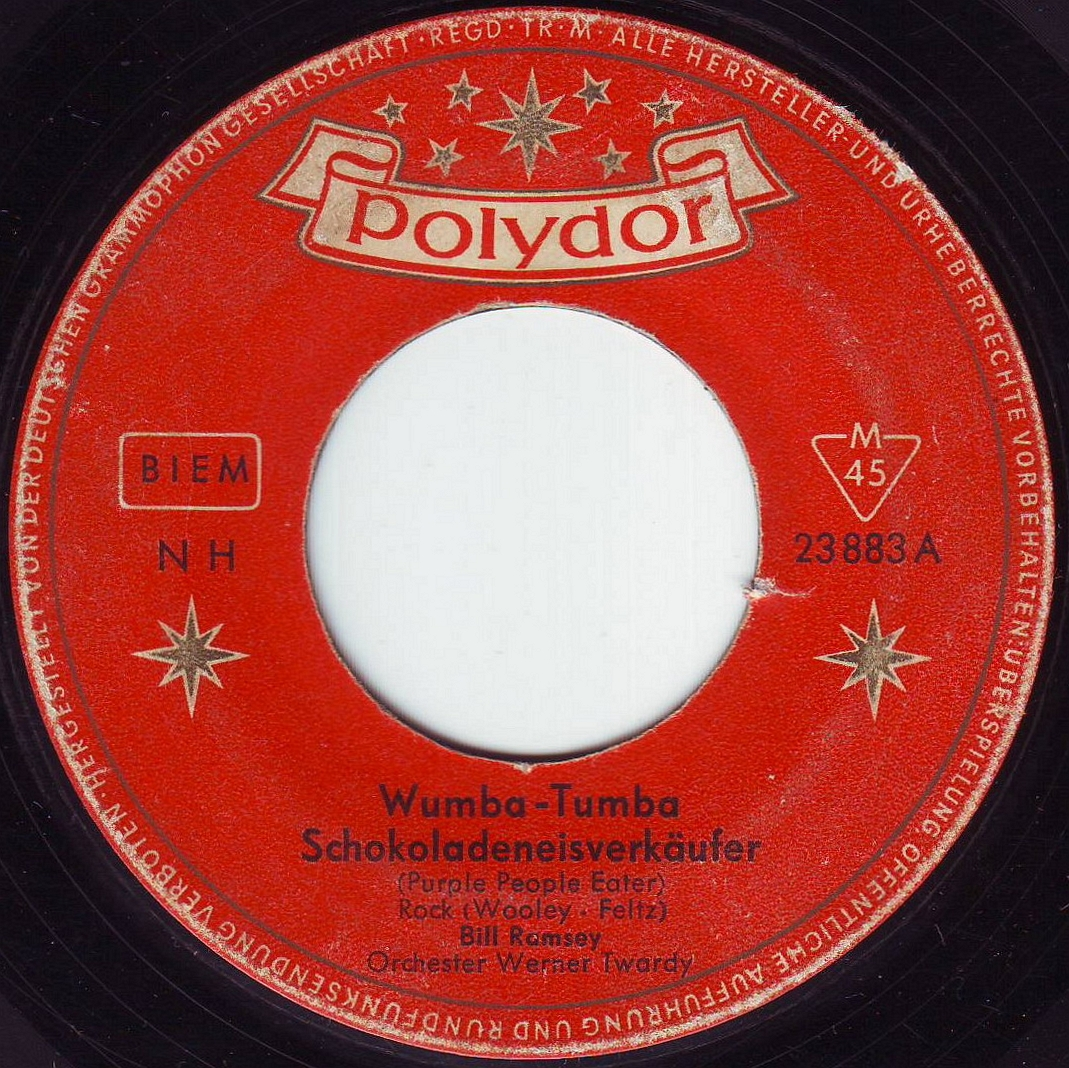
German single "Wumba-Tumba Schokoladeneisverkäufer"

Year	Title	Chartposition (DE)	Label/Catalogue no.
1958	Yes, Fanny, ich tu das		Polydor NH 23 738
1958	Wumba-Tumba Schokoladeneisverkäufer	4	Polydor NH 23 883
1959	Er war vom konstantinopelitanischen Gesangsverein		Polydor NH 24 002
1959	Souvenirs	1	Polydor NH 24 037
1959	Caldonia		Columbia C 21 261
1959	Hier könn' Matrosen vor Anker geh'n		Polydor NH 24 090
1960	Go Man Go (englisch)		Polydor NH 66 812
1960	Telefon aus Paris	39	Polydor NH 24 211
1960	Jeden Tag 'ne andre Party		Polydor NH 24 330
1961	Pigalle (Die große Mausefalle)	6	Polydor NH 24 428
1961	Telefon fra Paris (in Danish)		Polydor NH 22 974
1961	Immer zieht es mich zu ihr (with Peter Alexander)	10	Polydor NH 24 437
1961	Zuckerpuppe (aus der Bauchtanz-Truppe)	5	Polydor NH 24 553
1961	Das Leben ist doll	45	Polydor NH 24 616
1962	Nichts gegen die Weiber (with Bibi Johns)	25	Polydor NH 24 663
1962	Old Jonny war ein Wunderkind	47	Polydor NH 24 774
1962	Brauner Señor Mexicano (with Peter Alexander)		Polydor NH 24 915
1962	Ohne Krimi geht die Mimi nie ins Bett	3	Columbia C 22 197
1962	Mimi Needs A Thriller When She Goes To Bed		Columbia F 4948
1963	Maskenball bei Scotland Yard	8	Columbia C 22 333
1963	Sagst du alles deiner Frau? (with Chris Howland)		Columbia C 22 397
1963	Parlez-vous Francais?	51	Columbia C 22 456
1963	Molly		Columbia C 22 512
1963	Es gibt doch immer wieder Ärger (with Peter Weck)		Electrola E 22 515
1964	Bossa Nova Baby		Columbia C 22 635
1964	Ein bequemer Arbeitnehmer bin ich nicht		Columbia C 22 689
1964	Ein Student aus Heidelberg	21	Columbia C 22 701
1964	Zicke Zacke Hoi		Columbia C 22 842
1965	Chug-a-lug		Columbia C 22 884
1965	Bin nur ein Tramp		Columbia C 22 888
1965	Crazy Cowboy Grand Hotel		Columbia C 23 012
1966	Fat Man (& The Jay Five)		Cornet 3012
1966	Hollywood-Schaukellied		Polydor 52 699
1966	Yellow Submarine		Polydor 52 725
1967	Limonade wär' besser gewesen		Polydor 52 770
1967	Body Building Bill aus Boston		Polydor 52 874
1968	Otto ist auf Frauen scharf		Polydor 53 043
1968	Piccadilly Circus		Polydor 53 066
c. 1968	Blue-Eyed Lady (& The Jay Five with Bruno Spoerri)		Heco S 45 007
1969	Gesellschaftsspiele (als William Ramsey III.)		Polydor 53 130
1969	Sing ein kleines Lied vom Frieden (als William Ramsey III.)		Polydor 53 155
1970	Haschisch Halef Omar		Cornet 3165
1993	Probier's mal mit Gemütlichkeit (Dschungelbuch Groove)		ZYX Music 706012

=== EPs ===
- Go Man Go / Hier könn' Matrosen vor Anker geh'n / Souvenirs / Mach keinen Heck-Meck (1959; Polydor)
- Pigalle / Missouri Cowboy / Bist du einsam heut' Nacht / Immer zieht es mich zu ihr (with Peter Alexander) (1961; Polydor)
- Paul Abraham's Viktoria und ihr Husar (with Sonja Knittel, Sari Barabas, Conny Froboess, Jacqueline Boyer, Willy Hagara, Heinz Hoppe, Harry Friedauer, Rex Gildo, Paul Kuhn and the Botho-Lucas-Chor) (c. 1964; Electrola)
- My Fair Lady / Kiss Me, Kate (with Rex Gildo, Gitte, Willy Hagara, Ralf Bendix, Paul Kuhn and the Botho-Lucas-Chor) (1964; Electrola)

=== LPs ===
- William "Big Bill" Ramsey, Jazz Festival Sopot 1957 (with Riverside Syncopators Jazz-Band, Milano) (c. 1957; Muza)
- Die Blume von Hawaii / Viktoria und ihr Husar (with Peter Alexander, Rita Bartos, Margot Eskens, Franz Fehringer, Willy Hofmann, Margrit Imlau, Bibi Johns, Sándor Kónya, Willy Schneider and Herta Talmar) (c. 1961; Polydor)
- Evergreens aus dem Schlagerkeller (with Ralf Bendix, Chris Howland and Dany Mann) (1962; Electrola)
- Die Blume von Hawaii / Viktoria und ihr Husar (with Sonja Knittel, Sari Barabas, Conny Froboess, Jacqueline Boyer, Willy Hagara, Heinz Hoppe, Harry Friedauer, Rex Gildo, Paul Kuhn and the Botho-Lucas-Chor) (c. 1964; Electrola)
- Bill Ramsey's Schlagerparty (1964; Electrola)
- Sing ein Lied mit Onkel Bill / Kinderparty bei Bill Ramsey (children's party with Bill Ramsey, with Conny Froboess, Paul Kuhn, Ralf Paulsen and the Westfälische Nachtigallen) (1965; Electrola)
- Bill Ramsey singt Lieder seiner Heimat (Songs from Home) (1965; Electrola)
- Ballads & Blues (with Paul Kuhn) (1965; Electrola)
- Got A New Direction (& The Jay Five) (1966; Cornet)
- Sei mein Freund (Be my friend, 1972; Columbia)
- Songs, charity for Brot für die Welt (with Inge Brandenburg and Ingfried Hoffmann) (1974; Schwann)
- Hard Travelling (with Don Paulin) (1975; Warner Bros.)
- Die andere Seite – Dedicated to Nat King Cole (The other side, c. 1977; Polydor)
- On the Spot (with Dieter Reith, Matts Björklund, Jimmy Patrick, Dave King and Keith Forsey) (c. 1977; Polydor [?])
- Rückfall (1990; Papagayo)

=== CDs ===
- Caldonia and more ... (Bear Family Records), including recordings from 1957, 1966 and 1980
- Souvenirs (1992; Bear Family Records), including recordings from 1958 to 1961
- Ohne Krimi geht die Mimi nie ins Bett (1994; Bear Family Records), including recordings from 1962 to 1965
- Ballads And Blues / Songs From Home (Bear Family Records), including recordings from 1965
- The Other Side – A Dedication to Nat King Cole (Bear Family Records), including recordings from 1975 to 1977
- On the Spot (Bear Family Records), including recordings from 1977
- When I See You (with Toots Thielemans), Bell Records), including recordings from 1979 to 1980
- Underneath the Apple Tree (with Juraj Galan, Tyrostar), including recordings from 1983 to 1984
- Rückfall (1990; Papagayo)
- Getting' Back To Swing (with the SDR Big Band, conducted by Dieter Reith, 1994; Bear Family Records)
- Hamburg, keine ist wie du (1999; Bear Family Records)
- Ballads, Streets & Blues (with Peter Weniger and the Achim-Kück-Trio, 2001; Mons Records)
- Big Band Boogie (with the Thilo Wolf Big Band, 2002; Mons Records)
- Send In The Clowns (with Jean-Louis Rassinfosse, 005; Swingland Records)
- Here's To Life – Here's To Joe (with the hr-Bigband, conducted by Jörg Achim Keller, 2006; HR-Musik)

== Films ==
Ramsey appeared in 28 feature films, including:

- 1955: Music in the Blood (Musik im Blut), a Kurt Widmann biography
- 1955: Liebe, Tanz und 1000 Schlager
- 1959: Kein Mann zum Heiraten
- 1960: The Mystery of the Green Spider
- 1961: Heute gehn wir bummeln
- 1961: Junge Leute brauchen Liebe
- 1961: Our Crazy Aunts (Unsere tollen Tanten)
- 1961: Am Sonntag will mein Süßer mit mir segeln gehn
- 1961: Adieu, Lebewohl, Goodbye
- 1961: Schlagerparade 1961
- 1961: The Adventures of Count Bobby (Die Abenteuer des Grafen Bobby)
- 1962: Ohne Krimi geht die Mimi nie ins Bett
- 1962: Between Shanghai and St. Pauli (Zwischen Schanghai und St. Pauli)
- 1962: The Sweet Life of Count Bobby (Das süsse Leben des Grafen Bobby)
- 1962: Café Oriental
- 1963: Homesick for St. Pauli (Heimweh nach St. Pauli)
- 1963: Maskenball bei Scotland Yard
- 1964: Liebesgrüße aus Tirol
- 1964: Old Shatterhand
- 1971: Hurra, bei uns geht's rund
- 1978: The Swissmakers (Die Schweizermacher)
- 1990: Peter in Magicland (Peterchens Mondfahrt)
- 1993: Almenrausch und Pulverschnee (TV series)
- 1997: Tatort: Ausgespielt (TV)

== Awards ==
- Order of Merit of the Federal Republic of Germany
