= Let's Dance (German TV series) season 16 =

Let's Dance
- Season 16
- Celebrity winner: Anna Ermakova
- Professional winner: Valentin Lusin
- No. of episodes: 13

Release
- Original network: RTL
- Original release: 17 February (launch); 24 February 2023 – 19 May 2023

Season chronology
- ← Previous; Season 15

The sixteenth season of Let's Dance started on February 17, 2023, with the launch show on RTL. Daniel Hartwich and Victoria Swarovski returned as hosts. Joachim Llambi, Motsi Mabuse and Jorge González returned as judges.

Like in the previous seasons during the launch show the 14 celebrities found out which professional dancer they will dance with for the next few weeks.

Dancing Stars 2023 were Anna Ermakova & Valentin Lusin.

== Couples ==
On 6 January 2023, RTL announced the 14 celebrities. On 31 January 2023, were announced the 14 professional dancers. On 15 February 2023, two days before the start of the show, it was announced that Malika Dzumaev replaced the pregnant Renata Lusin.

Celebrity	Known for	Professional partner	Status
Alex Mariah Peter	Model & winner of Germany's Next Topmodel	Alexandru Ionel	Eliminated 1st on February 24, 2023
Abdelkarim	Comedian & television presenter	Kathrin Menzinger	Eliminated 2nd on March 3, 2023
Natalia Yegorova	Singer-songwriter, activist & former model	Andrzej Cibis	Eliminated 3rd on March 10, 2023
Younes Zarou	TikTok personality & influencer	Malika Dzumaev	Eliminated 4th on March 17, 2023
Sally Özcan	YouTube personality, entrepreneur & author	Massimo Sinato	Eliminated 5th on March 24, 2023
Ali Güngörmüş	Celebrity chef	Christina Luft; Patricija Ionel (Week 6)	Eliminated 6th & 7th on April 14, 2023
Mimi Kraus	Former handballer	Mariia Maksina; Ekaterina Leonova (Week 6)	Eliminated 6th & 7th on April 14, 2023
Chryssanthi Kavazi	Gute Zeiten, schlechte Zeiten actress	Vadim Garbuzov; Zsolt Sándor Cseke (Week 6)	Eliminated 8th on April 21, 2023
Sharon Battiste	The Bachelorette star	Christian Polanc; Alexandru Ionel (Week 2); Valentin Lusin (Week 6)	Eliminated 9th on April 28, 2023
Jens „Knossi“ Knossalla	Twitch streamer, Poker commentator, entertainer & Schlager singer	Isabel Edvardsson; Mariia Maksina (Week 6)	Eliminated 10th on May 5, 2023
Timon Krause	Magician & author	Ekaterina Leonova; Isabel Edvardsson (Week 6)	Eliminated 11th on May 12, 2023
Philipp Boy	Former olympic gymnast	Patricija Ionel; Christina Luft (Week 6)	Third place on May 19, 2023
Julia Beautx	YouTube personality, singer & actress	Zsolt Sándor Cseke; Vadim Garbuzov (Week 6)	Runners-up on May 19, 2023
Anna Ermakova	Model & daughter of Boris Becker	Valentin Lusin; Christian Polanc (Week 6)	Winners on May 19, 2023

== Scoring chart ==
Couple	Place	1	2	3	4	5	6	7	8	9	10	11	12	13
Anna & Valentin	1	23	25	29	30	28+9=37	30	29	30+10=40	30+8=38	30+30=60	26+30=56	29+30+25=84	30+30+30=90
Julia & Zsolt	2	10	21	22	27	19+9=28	25	24	27+10=37	29+6=35	29+28=57	30+30=60	29+26+25=80	27+30+30=87
Philipp & Patricija	3	18	21	29	23	25+9=34	30	25	27+6=33	30+3=33	28+29=57	30+30=60	30+26+17=73	27+30+30=87
Timon & Ekaterina	4	13	16	19	25	26+9=35	24	24	24+8=32	28+1=29	27+25=52	24+27=51	27+27+22=76	
Knossi & Isabel	5	12	9	20	19	22+9=31	26	24	24+8=32	25+4=29	26+25=51	18+21=39		
Sharon & Christian	6	19	19	25	23	28+9=37	19	30	24+8=32	23+10=33	24+30=54			
Chryssanthi & Vadim	7	19	17	12	13	19+9=28	23	21	23+10=33	19+2=21				
Mimi & Mariia	8	14	9	23	24	10+9=19	23	22	24+6=30					
Ali & Christina	9	13	8	16	20	17+9=26	15	19	20+6=26					
Sally & Massimo	10	17	15	16	19	19+9=28	22							
Younes & Malika	11	10	15	16	17	19+9=28								
Natalia & Andrzej	12	19	19	20	19									
Abdelkarim & Kathrin	13	11	10	10										
Alex Mariah & Alexandru	14	15	13											

Red numbers indicates the lowest score for each week.
Green numbers indicates the highest score for each week.
indicates the couple eliminated that week.
indicates the returning couple that finished in the bottom two or three.
indicates the couple which was immune from elimination.
indicates the couple that didn't perform due to personal reasons.
indicates the couple that withdrew from the competition.
indicates the couple was eliminated but later returned to the competition.
indicates the winning couple.
indicates the runner-up couple.
indicates the third-place couple.

=== Average chart ===
This table only counts for dances scored on a traditional 30-points scale.

Rank by average	Place	Couple	Total	Dances	Average
1	1	Anna & Valentin	544	19	28.6
2	3	Philipp & Patricija	505	19	26.6
3	2	Julia & Zsolt	488	19	25.7
4	6	Sharon & Christian	264	11	24.0
5	4	Timon & Ekaterina	378	16	23.6
6	5	Knossi & Isabel	271	13	20.8
7	12	Natalia & Andrzej	77	4	19.3
8	8	Mimi & Mariia	149	8	18.6
9	7	Chryssanthi & Vadim	166	9	18.4
10	10	Sally & Massimo	108	6	18.0
11	9	Ali & Christina	128	8	16.0
12	11	Younes & Malika	77	5	15.4
13	14	Alex Mariah & Alexandru	28	2	14.0
14	13	Abdelkarim & Kathrin	31	3	10.3

== Highest and lowest scoring performances ==
The best and worst performances in each dance according to the judges' 30-point scale are as follows.

Dance	Celebrity	Highest score	Celebrity	Lowest score
Bachata	Anna Ermakova; Sharon Battiste	30	-	
Cha-cha-cha	Anna Ermakova	29	Mimi Kraus	9
Charleston	Anna Ermakova; Philipp Boy	30	Abdelkarim	11
Contemporary	Philipp Boy; Julia Beautx; Anna Ermakova	30	Mimi Kraus	23
Foxtrot	Anna Ermakova	30	Abdelkarim	10
Freestyle	Anna Ermakova; Philipp Boy; Julia Beautx	30	Sharon Battiste	24
Jive	Philipp Boy	30	Ali Güngürmüş	8
Lindy hop	Jens "Knossi" Knossalla; Timon Krause	25	-	
Paso doble	Philipp Boy	30	Ali Güngürmüş	20
Quickstep	Anna Ermakova; Philipp Boy; Julia Beautx	30	Timon Krause	13
Rumba	Sharon Battiste; Anna Ermakova	30	Jens "Knossi" Knossalla	9
Salsa Marathon	Sharon Battiste	10	Timon Krause	1
Samba	Anna Ermakova; Julia Beautx	29	Ali Güngürmüş	15
Street	Philipp Boy	29	Julia Beautx	28
Tango	Philipp Boy; Anna Ermakova; Julia Beautx	30	Jens "Knossi" Knossalla; Chryssanthi Kavazi	12
Viennese waltz	Anna Ermakova	29	Younes Zarou	17
Waltz	Anna Ermakova	30	Alex Mariah Peter	15

== Couples' highest and lowest scoring dances ==
Scores are based upon a potential 30-point maximum.

Couples	Highest scoring dance	Lowest scoring dance
Anna & Valentin	Foxtrot, Quickstep, Waltz (twice), Charleston, Freestyle (twice), Bachata, Rumba, Contemporary, Tango (30)	Waltz (23)
Julia & Zsolt	Quickstep, Contemporary, Tango, Freestyle (30)	Cha-cha-cha (10)
Philipp & Patricia	Contemporary, Quickstep, Tango, Charleston, Paso doble, Jive, Freestyle (30)	Impro Charleston (17)
Timon & Ekaterina	Contemporary (28)	Quickstep (13)
Knossi & Isabel	Charleston, Freestyle (26)	Rumba (9)
Sharon & Christian	Rumba, Bachata (30)	Cha-cha-cha, Waltz, Quickstep (19)
Chryssanthi & Vadim	Charleston, Paso doble (23)	Tango (12)
Mimi & Mariia	Waltz, Charleston (24)	Cha-cha-cha (9)
Ali & Christina	Charleston, Paso doble (20)	Jive (8)
Sally & Massimo	Charleston (22)	Cha-cha-cha (15)
Younes & Malika	Jive (19)	Cha-cha-cha (10)
Natalia & Andrzej	Rumba (20)	Waltz, Charleston, Tango (19)
Abdelkarim & Kathrin	Charleston (11)	Cha-cha-cha, Foxtrot (10)
Alex Mariah & Alexandru	Waltz (15)	Cha-cha-cha (13)

== Weekly scores and songs ==
=== Launch show ===
For the seventh time, there was a launch show in which each celebrity met their partner for the first time. This show aired on 17 February 2023. In this first live show the celebrities and the professional partners danced in groups and each celebrity was awarded points by the judges and the viewers. At the end of the show the couple with the highest combined points was granted immunity from the first elimination in the following week.

Anna Ermakova received the highest combination of judge's scores and viewer votes and therefore won immunity for next week.

Order	Celebrity	Dance	Music	Judge's Scores				Result
Order	Celebrity	Dance	Music	González	Mabuse	Llambi	Total	Result
1	Julia Beautx	Cha-cha-cha	"Pata Pata"—Miriam Makeba	4	4	2	10	Safe
1	Sharon Battiste	Cha-cha-cha	"Pata Pata"—Miriam Makeba	6	7	6	19	Safe
1	Younes Zarou	Cha-cha-cha	"Pata Pata"—Miriam Makeba	4	4	2	10	Safe
2	Sally Özcan	Charleston	"Vielen Dank für die Blumen"—Udo Jürgens	6	6	5	17	Safe
2	Chryssanthi Kavazi	Charleston	"Vielen Dank für die Blumen"—Udo Jürgens	6	7	6	19	Safe
2	Abdelkarim	Charleston	"Vielen Dank für die Blumen"—Udo Jürgens	5	4	2	11	Safe
3	Jens „Knossi“ Knossalla	Tango	"Just a Gigolo"—David Lee Roth	5	5	2	12	Safe
3	Philipp Boy	Tango	"Just a Gigolo"—David Lee Roth	6	6	6	18	Safe
3	Ali Güngörmüş	Tango	"Just a Gigolo"—David Lee Roth	5	5	3	13	Safe
4	Timon Krause	Quickstep	"Ein bisschen Goethe, ein bisschen Bonaparte"—France Gall	5	5	3	13	Safe
4	Mimi Kraus	Quickstep	"Ein bisschen Goethe, ein bisschen Bonaparte"—France Gall	5	5	4	14	Safe
5	Alex Mariah Peter	Waltz	"See the Day"—Girls Aloud	6	6	3	15	Safe
5	Natalia Yegorova	Waltz	"See the Day"—Girls Aloud	7	7	5	19	Safe
5	Anna Ermakova	Waltz	"See the Day"—Girls Aloud	8	8	7	23	Won immunity

=== Week 1 ===
The couples performed one unlearned dance.

Order	Couple	Dance	Music	Judge's Scores				Result
Order	Couple	Dance	Music	González	Mabuse	Llambi	Total	Result
1	Sally & Massimo	Cha-cha-cha	"I Can't Help Myself (Sugar Pie Honey Bunch)"—The Four Tops	6	5	4	15	Safe
2	Alex Mariah & Alexandru	Cha-cha-cha	"Finally"—Yves V & HUGEL	5	5	3	13	Eliminated
3	Julia & Zsolt	Waltz	"Don't Speak"—No Doubt	8	7	6	21	Safe
4	Abdelkarim & Kathrin	Cha-cha-cha	"Cha Cha Cha D'Amour"—Dean Martin	5	4	1	10	Safe
5	Chryssanthi & Vadim	Jive	"Shake It Off"—Taylor Swift	6	6	5	17	Safe
6	Natalia & Andrzej	Charleston	"Milord"—Edith Piaf	7	7	5	19	Safe
7	Mimi & Mariia	Cha-cha-cha	"Conchita"—Lou Bega	4	3	2	9	Safe
8	Philipp & Patricija	Viennese waltz	"Use Somebody"—Kings of Leon	7	7	7	21	Safe
9	Younes & Malika	Quickstep	"Umbrella"—The Baseballs	6	5	4	15	Bottom two
10	Ali & Christina	Jive	"Don't Stop Me Now"—Queen	3	3	2	8	Safe
11	Knossi & Isabel	Rumba	"Reality"—Richard Sanderson	4	3	2	9	Safe
12	Timon & Ekaterina	Waltz	"Beneath Your Beautiful"—Labrinth & Emeli Sandé	7	6	3	16	Safe
13	Sharon & Christian	Waltz	"Für mich soll's rote Rosen regnen"—Hildegard Knef	7	7	5	19	Safe
14	Anna & Valentin	Tango	"Dance with Me"—Debelah Morgan	9	8	8	25	Immune

=== Week 2: "Born in ..." ===
The couples performed one unlearned dance to a song that came out the year the celebrities were born.

Due to an infection of his feet Christian Polanc was replaced by Alexandru Ionel.

Order	Couple	Dance	Music (Year)	Judge's Scores				Result
Order	Couple	Dance	Music (Year)	González	Mabuse	Llambi	Total	Result
1	Julia & Zsolt	Cha-cha-cha	"Let's Get Loud"—Jennifer Lopez (1999)	8	7	7	22	Safe
2	Younes & Malika	Rumba	"No Matter What"—Boyzone (1998)	6	6	4	16	Safe
3	Knossi & Isabel	Jive	"Danger Zone"—Kenny Loggins (1986)	7	7	6	20	Safe
4	Natalia & Andrzej	Rumba	"Mandy"—Barry Manilow (1974)	8	7	5	20	Safe
5	Chryssanthi & Vadim	Tango	"Personal Jesus"—Depeche Mode (1989)	5	5	2	12	Safe
6	Sally & Massimo	Rumba	"Listen to Your Heart"—Roxette (1988)	6	6	4	16	Safe
7	Timon & Ekaterina	Cha-cha-cha	"Sweets For My Sweet"—CJ Lewis (1994)	7	7	5	19	Safe
8	Ali & Christina	Cha-cha-cha	"Play That Funky Music"—Wild Cherry (1976)	6	6	4	16	Bottom two
9	Abdelkarim & Kathrin	Foxtrot	"Shaddap Your Face"—Joe Dolce (1981)	4	4	2	10	Eliminated
10	Philipp & Patricija	Jive	"Reet Petite"—Jackie Wilson (1987)	10	9	10	29	Safe
11	Mimi & Mariia	Tango	"Beat It"—Michael Jackson (1983)	9	8	6	23	Safe
12	Sharon & Alexandru	Contemporary	"Losing My Religion"—R.E.M. (1991)	9	8	8	25	Safe
13	Anna & Valentin	Cha-cha-cha	"Music"—Madonna (2000)	10	10	9	29	Safe

=== Week 3 ===
The couples performed one unlearned dance.

Order	Couple	Dance	Music	Judge's Scores				Result
Order	Couple	Dance	Music	González	Mabuse	Llambi	Total	Result
1	Ali & Christina	Charleston	"9 to 5"—Dolly Parton	8	7	5	20	Safe
2	Natalia & Andrzej	Tango	"A Evaristo Carriego"—Forever Tango	8	7	4	19	Eliminated
3	Younes & Malika	Viennese waltz	"Perfect"—Ed Sheeran	7	7	3	17	Safe
4	Knossi & Isabel	Foxtrot	"Love and Marriage"—Frank Sinatra	7	7	5	19	Safe
5	Chryssanthi & Vadim	Cha-cha-cha	"Flowers"—Miley Cyrus	6	6	1	13	Safe
6	Mimi & Mariia	Waltz	"Für immer und dich"—Rio Reiser	9	9	6	24	Safe
7	Sharon & Christian	Samba	"Mad Love"—Sean Paul & David Guetta feat. Becky G	8	8	7	23	Safe
8	Sally & Massimo	Foxtrot	"La Vie en rose"—Edith Piaf	7	7	5	19	Bottom two
9	Julia & Zsolt	Tango	"Tanguera"—Sexteto Mayor	10	9	8	27	Safe
10	Anna & Valentin	Foxtrot	"Oops I Did It Again"—Britney Spears	10	10	10	30	Safe
11	Timon & Ekaterina	Charleston	"Happy"—C2C feat. Derek Martin	9	8	8	25	Safe
12	Philipp & Patricija	Rumba	"Ese Momento"—Luis Enrique	7	8	8	23	Safe

=== Week 4: 80s Night ===
The couples performed one unlearned dance to music from the 1980's and a group Freestyle in the Girls vs Boys battle.

Order	Couple	Dance	Music	Judge's Scores				Result
Order	Couple	Dance	Music	González	Mabuse	Llambi	Total	Result
1	Philipp & Patricija	Cha-cha-cha	"Easy Lover"—Phil Collins	8	8	9	25	Safe
2	Ali & Christina	Quickstep	"Together Forever"—Rick Astley	7	6	4	17	Safe
3	Chryssanthi & Vadim	Viennese waltz	"Hijo de la Luna"—Mecano	8	7	4	19	Safe
4	Sally & Massimo	Tango	"Flashdance... What a Feeling!"—Irene Cara	7	7	5	19	Safe
5	Timon & Ekaterina	Rumba	"Do You Really Want to Hurt Me"—Culture Club	9	8	9	26	Safe
6	Sharon & Christian	Cha-cha-cha	"She Drives Me Crazy"—Fine Young Cannibals	10	9	9	28	Safe
7	Knossi & Isabel	Tango	"Relax"—Frankie Goes to Hollywood	8	8	6	22	Safe
8	Younes & Malika	Jive	"Take On Me"—A-ha	7	7	5	19	Eliminated
9	Anna & Valentin	Paso doble	"Running Up That Hill"—Kate Bush	10	9	9	28	Safe
10	Mimi & Mariia	Jive	"I'm Still Standing"—Elton John	5	4	1	10	Bottom two
11	Julia & Zsolt	Rumba	"She's Like the Wind"—Patrick Swayze feat. Wendy Fraser	7	7	5	19	Safe
Boys vs Girls Battle
1	Team Boys	Freestyle	"Baby Got Back"—Sir Mix-A-Lot "Macarena"—Los del Río "Bloody Mary"—Lady Gaga	10	8	8	(26) ⌀ 9	Both teams won the Boys vs Girls Battle
2	Team Girls	Freestyle	"Baby Got Back"—Sir Mix-A-Lot "Macarena"—Los del Río "Bloody Mary"—Lady Gaga	10	10	6	(26) ⌀ 9	Both teams won the Boys vs Girls Battle

=== Week 5 ===
The couples performed one unlearned dance.

Order	Couple	Dance	Music	Judge's Scores				Result
Order	Couple	Dance	Music	González	Mabuse	Llambi	Total	Result
1	Chryssanthi & Vadim	Charleston	"Girls Just Want to Have Fun"—Cyndi Lauper	9	8	6	23	Safe
2	Sharon & Christian	Quickstep	"The Look"—Roxette	7	7	5	19	Bottom two
3	Mimi & Mariia	Contemporary	"Pointless"—Lewis Capaldi	8	8	7	23	Safe
4	Sally & Massimo	Charleston	"Don't Bring Lulu"—The Andrews Sisters	8	8	6	22	Eliminated
5	Ali & Christina	Samba	"La Bomba"—King Africa	6	5	4	15	Safe
6	Timon & Ekaterina	Foxtrot	"City of Stars"—from La La Land	9	8	7	24	Safe
7	Anna & Valentin	Quickstep	"Anything Goes"—Lady Gaga & Tony Bennett	10	10	10	30	Safe
8	Knossi & Isabel	Charleston	"So ein Mann"—Margot Werner	9	9	8	26	Safe
9	Julia & Zsolt	Paso doble	"Everybody Wants to Rule the World"—Tears for Fears	9	8	8	25	Safe
10	Philipp & Patricija	Contemporary	"Bis meine Welt die Augen schließt"— Alexander Knappe	10	10	10	30	Safe

=== Week 6: Switch-Up Night ===
The couples performed one unlearned dance with a different partner. Due to the partner switch no couple was eliminated. Anna Ermakova received the highest combination of jury points and viewer votes and therefore won a bonus ranking point for the next week.

Ali Güngörmüş received the lowest combination of jury points and viewer votes and would have been eliminated.

Order	Couple	Dance	Music	Judge's Scores				Result
Order	Couple	Dance	Music	González	Mabuse	Llambi	Total	Result
1	Philipp & Christina	Samba	"Drop It on Me"—Ricky Martin & Daddy Yankee	9	8	8	25	Safe
2	Ali & Patricija	Waltz	"A Whiter Shade of Pale"—Procol Harum	7	7	5	19	Would have been eliminated
3	Mimi & Ekaterina	Paso doble	"Desire For Recklessness"—Kakegurui	8	8	6	22	Safe
4	Chryssanthi & Zsolt	Rumba	"Dancing Queen"—ABBA	8	7	6	21	Safe
5	Sharon & Valentin	Rumba	"One Night Only"—from Dreamgirls	10	10	10	30	Safe
6	Julia & Vadim	Viennese waltz	"FAKE"—Lola Young	9	8	7	24	Safe
7	Timon & Isabel	Jive	"Let's Twist Again"—Chubby Checker	9	9	6	24	Safe
8	Knossi & Mariia	Contemporary	"Legendary"—Welshly Arms	8	8	8	24	Safe
9	Anna & Christian	Samba	"Tic Tic Tac"—Bellini	10	10	9	29	Won bonus ranking point

=== Week 7 ===
The couples performed one unlearned dance and a team dance.

Order	Couple	Dance	Music	Judge's Scores				Result
Order	Couple	Dance	Music	González	Mabuse	Llambi	Total	Result
1	Julia & Zsolt	Charleston	"Call Me Maybe"—Carly Rae Jepsen	9	9	9	27	Safe
2	Philipp & Patricija	Waltz	"When I Need You"—Luther Vandross	9	9	9	27	Safe
3	Chryssanthi & Vadim	Paso doble	"Spectrum"—Florence and the Machine	8	8	7	23	Safe
4	Ali & Christina	Paso doble	"Toreador Olé"—Marc Reift Orchestra	7	7	6	20	Eliminated
5	Timon & Ekaterina	Viennese waltz	"Hallelujah"—Jeff Buckley	9	8	7	24	Safe
6	Sharon & Christian	Jive	"Made You Look"—Meghan Trainor	9	8	7	24	Safe
7	Anna & Valentin	Waltz	"Consequences"—Camila Cabello	10	10	10	30	Safe
8	Mimi & Mariia	Charleston	"Mi Mi Mi"—Serebro	8	8	8	24	Eliminated
9	Knossi & Isabel	Paso doble	"Let Me Entertain You"—Robbie Williams	8	7	9	24	Bottom three
Team Dances
1	Team Motsi (Anna & Valentin, Julia & Zsolt, Chryssanthi & Vadim)	Freestyle	"Bring Me to Life"—Evanescence	10				Team Motsi won the Team Dances
2	Team Jorge (Sharon & Christian, Knossi & Isabel, Timon & Ekaterina)	Freestyle	Chicago Medley ("Cell Block Tango" / "All That Jazz" / "Hot Honey Rag")	8				Team Motsi won the Team Dances
3	Team Llambi (Ali & Christina, Philipp & Patricija, Mimi & Mariia)	Freestyle	Cologne Medley ("Et Trömmelche" / "Viva Colonia" / "Superjeile Zick" / "Du bes die Stadt")	6				Team Motsi won the Team Dances

=== Week 8 ===
The couples performed one unlearned dance and competed in the Salsa marathon.

Order	Couple	Dance	Music	Judge's Scores			Total	Result
Order	Couple	Dance	Music	González	Mabuse	Llambi	Total	Result
1	Philipp & Patricija	Quickstep	"I'm Sitting On Top Of The World" - Bobby Darin	10	10	10	30	Safe
2	Chryssanthi & Vadim	Foxtrot	"Sunny Afternoon" - The Kinks	7	7	5	19	Eliminated
3	Julia & Zsolt	Samba	"Bam Bam" - Camila Cabello & Ed Sheeran	10	9	10	29	Safe
4	Sharon & Christian	Viennese waltz	"Cuz I Love You" - Lizzo	9	8	6	23	Bottom two
5	Anna & Valentin	Charleston	"Puppet On A String" - Sandie Shaw	10	10	10	30	Safe
6	Knossi & Isabel	Viennese waltz	"Chim Chim Cher-ee"- Mary Poppins	9	8	8	25	Safe
7	Timon & Ekaterina	Contemporary	"Falling"- Harry Styles	10	9	9	28	Bottom three
Salsa Marathon
	Timon & Ekaterina; Chryssanthi & Vadim; Philip & Patricija; Knossi & Isabel; Julia & Zsolt; Anna & Valentin; Sharon & Christian	Salsa		1; 2; 3; 4; 6; 8; 10				Sharon & Christian won the Salsa Marathon

=== Week 9: "Magic Moments" ===
The couples performed a freestyle to celebrate their magic moment in life and competeted in a dance duel.

Order	Couple	Dance	Music	Judge's Scores			Total	Result
Order	Couple	Dance	Music	González	Mabuse	Llambi	Total	Result
1	Philipp & Patricija	Freestyle	"Survivor" - 2WEI/ "Hold My Hand"- Lady Gaga	9	10	9	28	Safe
2	Sharon & Christian	Freestyle	"Can't Help Falling In Love"- Elvis Presley	8	8	8	24	Eliminated
3	Knossi & Isabel	Freestyle	"You Raise Me Up"- Westlife	9	9	8	26	Bottom two
4	Timon & Ekaterina	Freestyle	"Requiem For A Dream"- Scott Benson Band	9	9	9	27	Bottom three
5	Julia & Zsolt	Freestyle	"Ain’t No Mountain High Enough"- Marvin Gaye and Tammi Terrell	10	10	9	29	Safe
6	Anna & Valentin	Freestyle	"Behind Blue Eyes"- The Who	10	10	10	30	Safe
Dance Duels
1	Knossi & Isabel	Lindy hop	"Mack The Knife"- Roger Cicero	8	8	9	25	Both couples won the dance duel
1	Timon & Ekaterina	Lindy hop	"Mack The Knife"- Roger Cicero	8	8	9	25	Both couples won the dance duel
2	Julia & Zsolt	Street	"Wildberry Lillet"- Nina Chuba	9	9	10	28	Philipp & Patricija won the dance duel
2	Philipp & Patricija	Street	"Wildberry Lillet"- Nina Chuba	9	10	10	29	Philipp & Patricija won the dance duel
3	Anna & Valentin	Bachata	"La Bachata"- Manuel Turizo	10	10	10	30	Both couples won the dance duel
3	Sharon & Christian	Bachata	"La Bachata"- Manuel Turizo	10	10	10	30	Both couples won the dance duel

=== Week 10: Movie Night ===
The couples performed one unlearned dance in round one and a trio dance with another professional partner in round two.

Order	Couple	Dance	Music	Judge's Scores			Total	Result
Order	Couple	Dance	Music	González	Mabuse	Llambi	Total	Result
1	Anna & Valentin (with Massimo Sinató)	Jive	"Hey, Pippi Longstocking"- Orchestra FKM	9	9	8	26	Safe
6	Anna & Valentin (with Massimo Sinató)	Rumba	"Tell It To My Heart"- Taylor Dayne	10	10	10	30	Safe
2	Timon & Ekaterina (with Mariia Maksina)	Tango	"Discombobulate"- Hans Zimmer	9	8	7	24	Bottom two
7	Timon & Ekaterina (with Mariia Maksina)	Samba	"Hamma!"- Culcha Candela	9	9	9	27	Bottom two
3	Julia & Zsolt (with Vadim Garbuzov)	Quickstep	"We Go Together"- Olivia Newton-John and John Travolta	10	10	10	30	Safe
10	Julia & Zsolt (with Vadim Garbuzov)	Contemporary	"Boyfriend"- Dove Cameron	10	10	10	30	Safe
4	Knossi & Isabel (with Kathrin Menzinger)	Quickstep	"I Wanna Be Like You"- "The Jungle Book"	7	7	4	18	Eliminated
8	Knossi & Isabel (with Kathrin Menzinger)	Cha-cha-cha	"Mustang Sally"- The Commitments	8	8	5	21	Eliminated
5	Philipp & Patricija (with Christina Luft)	Tango	"Valentine's Tango"- The Twins	10	10	10	30	Safe
9	Philipp & Patricija (with Christina Luft)	Charleston	"That Man"- Caro Emerald	10	10	10	30	Safe

=== Week 11: Semi-Final ===
The couples will perform two unlearned dances and an Improv dance. The specific dance style, music and costumes for the Impro dance were given to the couples only three minutes before their performance.

Order	Couple	Dance	Music	Judge's Scores			Total	Result
Order	Couple	Dance	Music	González	Mabuse	Llambi	Total	Result
1	Philipp & Patricija	Paso doble	"Paint It Black" - The Rolling Stones	10	10	10	30	Bottom two
6	Philipp & Patricija	Foxtrot	"Beyond the Sea" - Bobby Darin	9	9	8	26	Bottom two
12	Philipp & Patricija	Charleston	"Five Foot Two, Eyes of Blue" -	7	6	4	17	Bottom two
2	Julia & Zsolt	Foxtrot	"What Is Love" - Haddaway	10	10	9	29	Safe
5	Julia & Zsolt	Jive	"Good 4 U" - Olivia Rodrigo	9	9	8	26	Safe
11	Julia & Zsolt	Tango		9	9	7	25	Safe
3	Timon & Ekaterina	Quickstep	"Hey Good Lookin'" - Hank Williams	9	9	9	27	Eliminated
7	Timon & Ekaterina	Paso doble	"El Gato Montes" - Manuel Penella	9	9	9	27	Eliminated
10	Timon & Ekaterina	Cha-cha-cha	"Tik Tok" - Kesha	8	8	6	22	Eliminated
4	Anna & Valentin	Viennese waltz	"Who's Loving You" - Jennie Lena	10	10	9	29	Safe
8	Anna & Valentin	Contemporary	"River" - Bishop Briggs	10	10	10	30	Safe
9	Anna & Valentin	Rumba	"Fallen" - Lauren Wood	9	9	7	25	Safe

=== Week 12: Final ===
The couples will perform a dance chosen by the judges for them to repeat, their favourite dance of the season and movie theme Freestyle.

Order	Couple	Dance	Music	Judge's Scores			Total	Result
Order	Couple	Dance	Music	González	Mabuse	Llambi	Total	Result
1	Anna & Valentin	Tango	"To Tango Tis Nefelis" - Haris Alexiou	10	10	10	30	Winners
6	Anna & Valentin	Waltz	"Consequences" - Camila Cabello	10	10	10	30	Winners
9	Anna & Valentin	Freestyle		10	10	10	30	Winners
2	Philipp & Patricija	Viennese waltz	"If I Knew" - Bruno Mars	9	9	9	27	Third place
5	Philipp & Patricija	Jive	"Reet Petite" - Jackie Wilson	10	10	10	30	Third place
7	Philipp & Patricija	Freestyle		10	10	10	30	Third place
3	Julia & Zsolt	Rumba	"Bésame Mucho" - Cesaria Evora	9	9	9	27	Runners-up
4	Julia & Zsolt	Tango	"Tanguera" - Sexteto Mayor	10	10	10	30	Runners-up
8	Julia & Zsolt	Freestyle		10	10	10	30	Runners-up

== Dance chart ==
Highest scoring dance
Lowest scoring dance
Not performed due to illness or injury
Couple withdrew that week

Couple	Launch Show	Week 1	Week 2	Week 3	Week 4		Week 5	Week 6	Week 7		Week 8		Week 9		Week 10		Week 11			Week 12		
Anna & Valentin	Waltz	Tango	Cha-cha-cha	Foxtrot	Paso doble	Freestyle (Girls)	Quickstep	Samba	Waltz	Freestyle (Team Motsi)	Charleston	Salsa	Freestyle	Bachata	Jive	Rumba	Viennese waltz	Contemporary	Rumba	Tango	Waltz	Freestyle
Julia & Zsolt	Cha-cha-cha	Waltz	Cha-cha-cha	Tango	Rumba	Freestyle (Girls)	Paso doble	Viennese waltz	Charleston	Freestyle (Team Motsi)	Samba	Salsa	Freestyle	Street	Quickstep	Contemporary	Foxtrot	Jive	Tango	Rumba	Tango	Freestyle
Philipp & Patricija	Tango	Viennese waltz	Jive	Rumba	Cha-cha-cha	Freestyle (Boys)	Contemporary	Samba	Waltz	Freestyle (Team Llambi)	Quickstep	Salsa	Freestyle	Street	Tango	Charleston	Paso doble	Foxtrot	Charleston	Viennese waltz	Jive	Freestyle
Timon & Ekaterina	Quickstep	Waltz	Cha-cha-cha	Charleston	Rumba	Freestyle (Boys)	Foxtrot	Jive	Viennese waltz	Freestyle (Team Jorge)	Contemporary	Salsa	Freestyle	Lindy hop	Tango	Samba	Quickstep	Paso doble	Cha-cha-cha			
Knossi & Isabel	Tango	Rumba	Jive	Foxtrot	Tango	Freestyle (Boys)	Charleston	Contemporary	Paso doble	Freestyle (Team Jorge)	Viennese waltz	Salsa	Freestyle	Lindy hop	Quickstep	Cha-cha-cha						
Sharon & Christian	Cha-cha-cha	Waltz	Contemporary	Samba	Cha-cha-cha	Freestyle (Girls)	Quickstep	Rumba	Jive	Freestyle (Team Jorge)	Viennese waltz	Salsa	Freestyle	Bachata								
Chryssanthi & Vadim	Charleston	Jive	Tango	Cha-cha-cha	Viennese waltz	Freestyle (Girls)	Charleston	Rumba	Paso doble	Freestyle (Team Motsi)	Foxtrot	Salsa										
Mimi & Mariia	Quickstep	Cha-cha-cha	Tango	Waltz	Jive	Freestyle (Boys)	Contemporary	Paso doble	Charleston	Freestyle (Team Llambi)												
Ali & Christina	Tango	Jive	Cha-cha-cha	Charleston	Quickstep	Freestyle (Boys)	Samba	Waltz	Paso doble	Freestyle (Team Llambi)												
Sally & Massimo	Charleston	Cha-cha-cha	Rumba	Foxtrot	Tango	Freestyle (Girls)	Charleston															
Younes & Malika	Cha-cha-cha	Quickstep	Rumba	Viennese waltz	Jive	Freestyle (Boys)																
Natalia & Andrzej	Waltz	Charleston	Rumba	Tango																		
Adelkarim & Katrin	Charleston	Cha-cha-cha	Foxtrot																			
Alex Mariah & Alexandru	Waltz	Cha-cha-cha																				

- Launch show: Cha-cha-cha, Charleston, Tango, Quickstep, Waltz
- Week 1: One unlearned dance (introducing Jive, Viennese waltz, Rumba)
- Week 2 (Born in ...): One unlearned dance (introducing Foxtrot, Contemporary)
- Week 3: One unlearned dance (introducing Samba)
- Week 4 (80s Night): One unlearned dance (introducing Paso doble) and group Freestyle (Boys vs Girls Battle)
- Week 5: One unlearned dance
- Week 6 (Switch-Up Night): One unlearned dance
- Week 7: One unlearned dance and team dances
- Week 8: One unlearned dance and Salsa marathon
- Week 9 (Magic Moments): Freestyle and dance duels
- Week 10 (Movie Night): One unlearned dance and trio dances
- Week 11 (Semi-Final): Two unlearned dances and improv dances
- Week 12 (Final): Dance chosen by the judges, favourite dance and Freestyle
