= List of number-one hits of 1959 (Germany) =

This is a list of the German Media Control Top100 Singles Chart number-ones of 1959.

Issue date	Song	Artist
3 January	"La Paloma"	Billy Vaughn
10 January	"La Paloma"	Billy Vaughn
17 January	"La Paloma"	Billy Vaughn
24 January	"La Paloma"	Billy Vaughn
31 January	"Tom Dooley"	Nilsen Brothers
7 February	"Tom Dooley"	Nilsen Brothers
14 February	"Tom Dooley"	Nilsen Brothers
21 February	"Tom Dooley"	Nilsen Brothers
28 February	"Tom Dooley"	Nilsen Brothers
7 March	"Tom Dooley"	Nilsen Brothers
14 March	"Tom Dooley"	Nilsen Brothers
21 March	"Tom Dooley"	Kingston Trio
28 March	"Tom Dooley"	Kingston Trio
4 April	"Tom Dooley"	Kingston Trio
11 April	"Tom Dooley"	Kingston Trio
18 April	"Tom Dooley"	Kingston Trio
25 April	"Die Gitarre und das Meer"	Freddy Quinn
2 May	"Die Gitarre und das Meer"	Freddy Quinn
9 May	"Die Gitarre und das Meer"	Freddy Quinn
16 May	"Die Gitarre und das Meer"	Freddy Quinn
23 May	"Die Gitarre und das Meer"	Freddy Quinn
30 May	"Die Gitarre und das Meer"	Freddy Quinn
6 June	"Die Gitarre und das Meer"	Freddy Quinn
13 June	"Die Gitarre und das Meer"	Freddy Quinn
20 June	"Die Gitarre und das Meer"	Freddy Quinn
27 June	"Die Gitarre und das Meer"	Freddy Quinn
4 July	"Die Gitarre und das Meer"	Freddy Quinn
11 July	"Die Gitarre und das Meer"	Freddy Quinn
18 July	"Die Gitarre und das Meer"	Freddy Quinn
25 July	"Die Gitarre und das Meer"	Freddy Quinn
1 August	"Am Tag, als der Regen kam"	Dalida
8 August	"Am Tag, als der Regen kam"	Dalida
15 August	"Am Tag, als der Regen kam"	Dalida
22 August	"Am Tag, als der Regen kam"	Dalida
29 August	"Am Tag, als der Regen kam"	Dalida
5 September	"Am Tag, als der Regen kam"	Dalida
12 September	"Am Tag, als der Regen kam"	Dalida
19 September	"Am Tag, als der Regen kam"	Dalida
26 September	"Am Tag, als der Regen kam"	Dalida
3 October	"Am Tag, als der Regen kam"	Dalida
10 October	"Souvenirs"	Bill Ramsey
17 October	"Souvenirs"	Bill Ramsey
24 October	"Souvenirs"	Bill Ramsey
31 October	"Souvenirs"	Bill Ramsey
7 November	"Souvenirs"	Bill Ramsey
14 November	"Souvenirs"	Bill Ramsey
21 November	"Unter fremden Sternen"	Freddy Quinn
28 November	"Unter fremden Sternen"	Freddy Quinn
5 December	"Unter fremden Sternen"	Freddy Quinn
12 December	"Unter fremden Sternen"	Freddy Quinn
19 December	"Unter fremden Sternen"	Freddy Quinn
26 December	"Unter fremden Sternen"	Freddy Quinn
