= Rolf Zuckowski =

German singer-songwriter (born 1947)

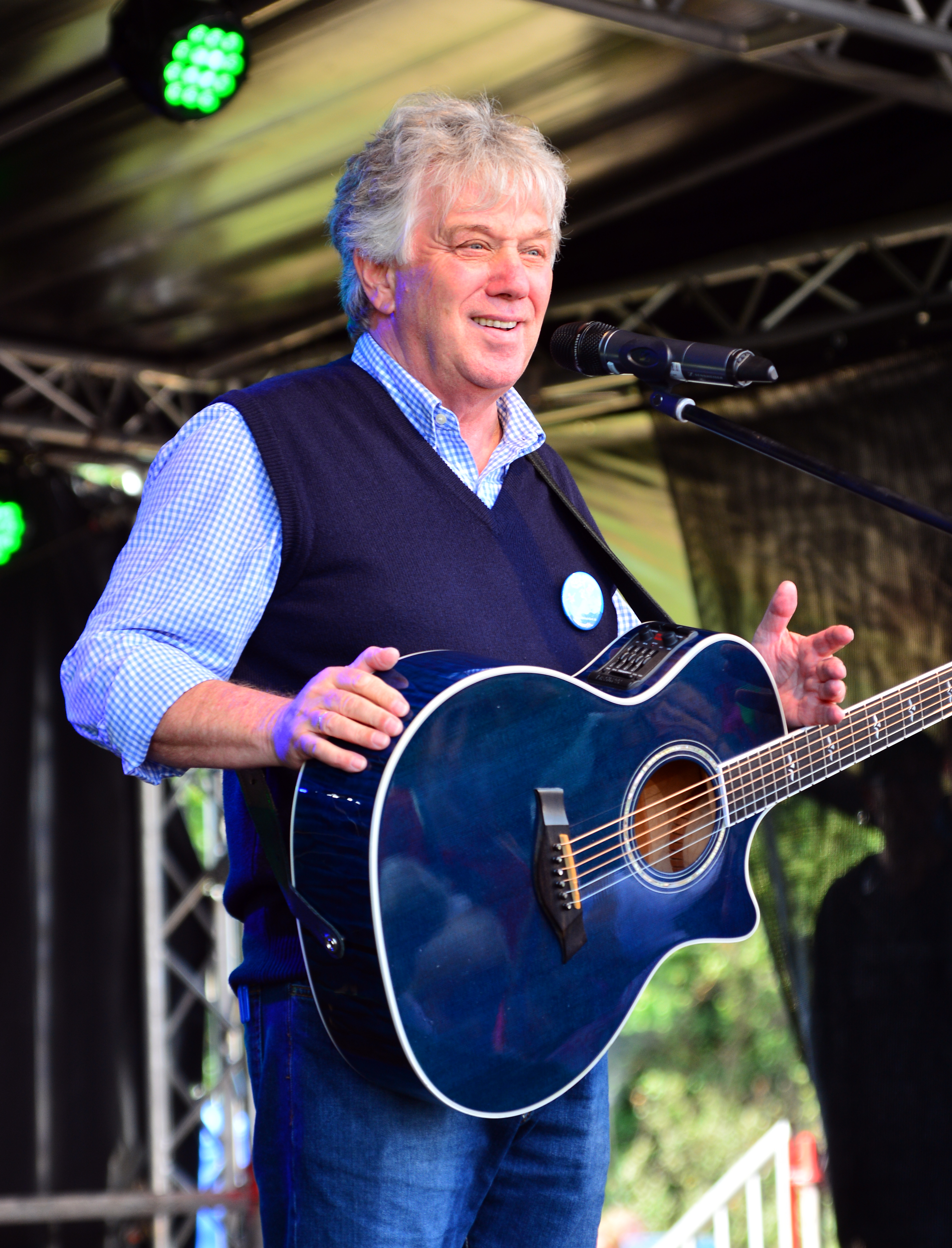
Zuckowski at Appen musiziert 2015

Rolf Zuckowski (born 12 May 1947) is a German singer-songwriter. He has written and composed music especially for children, but his songs are very popular among adults, too. His compositions involve children in music throughout their childhood and accompany their daily life. Meanwhile, many of his songs have attained the status of Folk songs.

He also is the father of composer and songwriter Alexander Zuckowski, who used to play bass guitar in his father's band.

== Early life ==
Zuckowski was born in Hamburg, Germany, and attended the Albrecht-Thaer-Gymnasium, where he completed his abitur. He gained his first skills and experience as a musician in school at the age of 18. He was part of the school band "The BeAthovens," where he played the guitar and sang. In 1967, he released his first album, "Happy to be happy," and began to study Economics at Hamburg University. After his graduation in 1972, Zuckowski worked for the music publishing firm International Music Publishers Hans Sikorski.

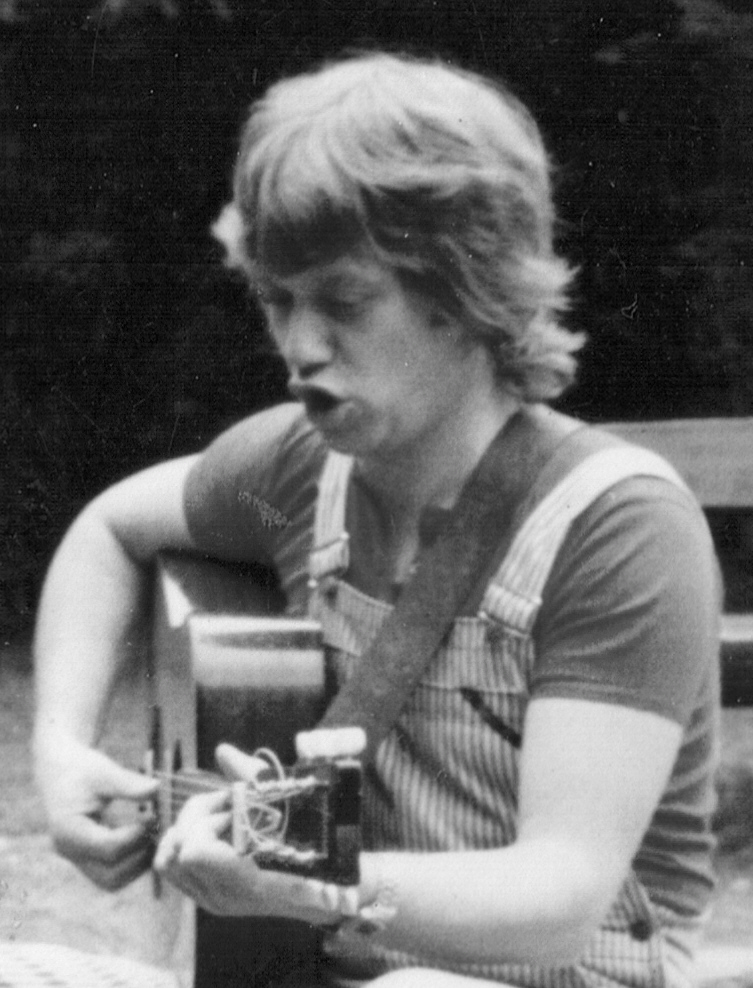
Rolf Zuckowski in 1981

== Career ==
As a producer, composer and conductor, Zuckowski composed songs for several artists, such as the Swiss music group Peter, Sue & Marc. Together, they, repeatedly, took part in the Eurovision Song Contest.

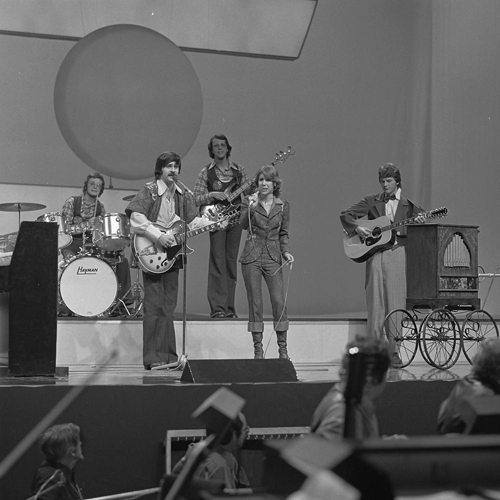
Peter, Sue & Marc

In 1978, he released his first record for children, "Rolfs Vogelhochzeit" (Rolf's Wedding of the Birds) which is a German singspiel. In this record, he sings and tells the story of a bird couple that marries, builds a nest, and cares for offspring. Many songs followed, and Zuckowski's popularity increased. In 1979, Zuckowski published the album "Rolfs Schulweg-Hitparade," which promotes road safety to children in a musical manner. The album is a cooperation with the German aid agencies Ein Herz für Kinder (A Heart for Children) and "Kind und Verkehr."

Zuckowski became popular on the radio and gained international recognition with the song "Du da im Radio," the LP/MC "Radio Lollipop," and the radio-series "Hallo du da." He gained more recognition through several television appearances: In the German television series ZDF-Hitparade, he achieved the first place with his song "...und ganz doll mich." In 1982, he was invited to perform his songs "...und ganz doll mich" and, in 1987, "In der Weihnachtsbäckerei" (In the Christmas bakery) in the entertainment television show Wetten, dass? (German for "Wanna Bet That...?").

In 1983, Zuckowski made the drafts for the album Tabaluga, for which he also composed various songs. The album turned into a great success. One year later, he developed the television show "Große Show für kleine Leute." In 1990, "Rolfs Vogelhochzeit" was shown on the German TV channel ZDF. Two years later, his song cycle "die Jahresuhr" and the new "Schulweg-Hitparade" were published as videos. In 1994, he set up his own company under the umbrella of the Universal Music Group. In 1999, he published the children's musical Der kleine Tag.

The hit theme song "We are the children of the Suderhof" from the popular children's TV show Neues vom Süderhof was composed by Zuckowski.

Zuckowski has released 45 studio albums, 1 audio play, 2 live albums, 8 Christmas albums, 9 video albums, 14 compilations, 1 boxset, and 45 singles.

Some of Zuckowski's other famous works are the songs "Wie schön, dass du geboren bist" (How wonderful it is that you were born), "Stups, der kleine Osterhase," and "Kommt wir woll’n Laterne laufen." He also writes songs for adults and sees himself as a singer songwriter for the whole family.

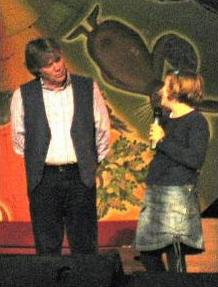
Rolf Zuckowski in 2006

== Awards ==
- In 1986, Zuckowski's song "...und ganz doll mich" made it into The Guinness Book of World Records as the "World’s longest song." Zuckowski used 3776 lines that had been written by children.
- In 1992, he received the "Christophorus Preis" for the artistic realization of the song "Schulweg-Hitparade"
- In 1994 and 2008, he was awarded the Echo Music Prize for his work as a composer, songwriter, artist and music producer
- In 2000, he received the Deutscher Musikpreis.
- In 2001, he was awarded the Paul-Lincke-Ring by the town of Goslar for his work in the category "popular music"
- In 2003, Zuckowski was awarded the German "Musikeditionspreis" for the complete works of "Rolfs Vogelhochzeit"
- In 2005, Rolf Zuckowski receives the Order of Merit of the Federal Republic of Germany to acknowledge his contribution to the musical development of children.
- In 2007, he is awarded the Goldene Stimmgabel
