= Der kleine Tag =

- Music: Rolf Zuckowski; Hans Niehaus
- Lyrics: Wolfram Eicke
- Book: Wolfram Eicke
- Basis: "Der kleine Tag" by Eicke
- Productions: 1999 Münchner Planetarium
- Awards: Leopold

Der kleine Tag (The Little Day) is a story by Wolfram Eicke which became known in a musical version in collaboration with Rolf Zuckowski and Hans Niehaus. The story was published in 1988. The musical, for children but not only children, first appeared in print in 1998, and as an audio play and CD in 1999 when it premiered at the Münchner Planetarium. The musical is often presented on stage, both by professionals and by schools and music academies. It received several awards.

== History ==
Wolfram Eicke, an author of youth literature and a Liedermacher (singer-songwriter), wrote the story "Der kleine Tag". He had the idea in 1984, and it was published in 1988. Together with Eicke, Rolf Zuckowski and Hans Niehaus derived a musical and audio play from the story "for children but not only for children". It was first published in print by Hans Sikorski in 1998. It premiered at the Münchner Planetarium of the Deutsches Museum in Munich in 1999, and appeared on CD in 1999, also by Sikorski. The narrator was Gunter Schoß, the title role was played by Lucie Schäfer, and the Mysterious Day by Bill Ramsey. The musical has often been produced by project groups from schools and music academies in Germany and abroad.

== Plot ==
The Little Day is one of several characters impersonating calendar days as Lichtwesen (light creatures) living above the Earth. Each day, one of them comes to Earth and experiences things happening that day, including war, peace and inventions. Each day character has only one chance, reports events on return, and gets ranked by the importance of the events, with sitting in the first row (Erste Reihe) in the meetings being the highest rank. The Little Day waits impatiently for its chance on the next 23 April (in the musical, while it is 23 February in the story), and talks to the Mysterious Day (Geheimnisvoller Tag), a character who was ranked high, but is unsure if the day was a good day, because that day lenses were invented, making glasses and other good inventions possible but also the better aiming of weapons (Zielfernrohr). The Mysterious Day explains that ranking is less important than being unique and authentic.

On 23 April, the Little Day experiences events including a family moving, with their expectations and difficulties, repair work on a street, and people waiting at a bus station and complaining about the weather, causing the Little Day to ask the sun to shine. Other events include a class at school where a child has a birthday and receives a dog, and all children in the class imagining that animals are sitting in the class as pupils. In another, two people meet after a 50-year absence, a son and his father reconcile, a young couple dance in a park, and a family enjoys a picnic einfach nur so ("just like that" or "for no reason at all").

The Little Day returns happily but is not ranked high, because nothing special happened. The Mysterious Day is not able to prevent the Little Day's disappointment. The following year, the Day for 23 April reports that people on Earth celebrated in memory of the day a year earlier, which had been the most peaceful day of all times, without wars, catastrophes or hunger. This report leads to Little Day's promotion to the first row.

== Music ==
The musical is scored for soloists, choir, orchestra and combo. The duration is given as 65 minutes.

== Reception and awards ==
The audio play and musical received the biennial Leopold award of the Verband deutscher Musikschulen (Association of German music schools) in 2001, recommending it as "Gute Musik für Kinder" ("Good music for children"), suitable for children from age 8. It also received the special prize of a jury of children, the Poldi, from the WDR. On the 10th anniversary of the premiere on 3 October 2009, the publisher issued a special edition of its newsletter, with interviews of authors and performers. It reported 2,650 performances on more than 300 stages. In 2012, Eicke received a golden award when 150,000 CDs were sold.

== Musical numbers ==
- Das Licht I (instrumental)
- Ich bin nur heute
- Erste Reihe – Spitzenklasse
- Tage, die man nie vergisst
- Der geheimnisvolle Tag (instrumental)
- Du bist du
- Aufbruch I (instrumental)
- Das Dunkel und ich
- Aufbruch II (instrumental)
- Wahnsinn
- Das Licht II (instrumental)
- Schule für Tiere
- Hier kommen wir
- Heute I (instrumental)
- Unterwegs I (instrumental)
- Dies ist der Augenblick
- Unterwegs II (instrumental)
- Heute II (instrumental)
- Einfach nur so
- Mich ruft mein Stern
- Erste Reihe – Spitzenklasse
- Letzte Reihe – Gestern
- Ich bin ich
- Jeder Tag hat sein Geheimnis
- Wohin?

== Editions ==
- Wolfram Eicke (Autor), Ursula Kirchberg (Illustrationen): Der kleine Tag besucht die Erde. Ellermann, München 1988, ISBN 3-7707-6287-8.
- Wolfram Eicke, Hans Niehaus, Rolf Zuckowski: Der kleine Tag. Auf dem Lichtstrahl zur Erde und zurück. Sikorski, Hamburg 1999, ISBN 3-920880-92-7.
- Wolfram Eicke, Hans Niehaus, Rolf Zuckowski: Der kleine Tag. Auf dem Lichtstrahl zur Erde und zurück. Polydor, Hamburg 1999 (2 CDs).
