= Almenrausch und Pulverschnee =

- Also known as: Almenrausch and Powder Snow
- Country of origin: Germany

Almenrausch und Pulverschnee (German: Almenrausch and Powder Snow) was a German home television series which aired on RTL from 26 March 1993 to 21 May 1993.

== See also ==
- List of German television series
