= Ohne Krimi geht die Mimi nie ins Bett =

- Schlager
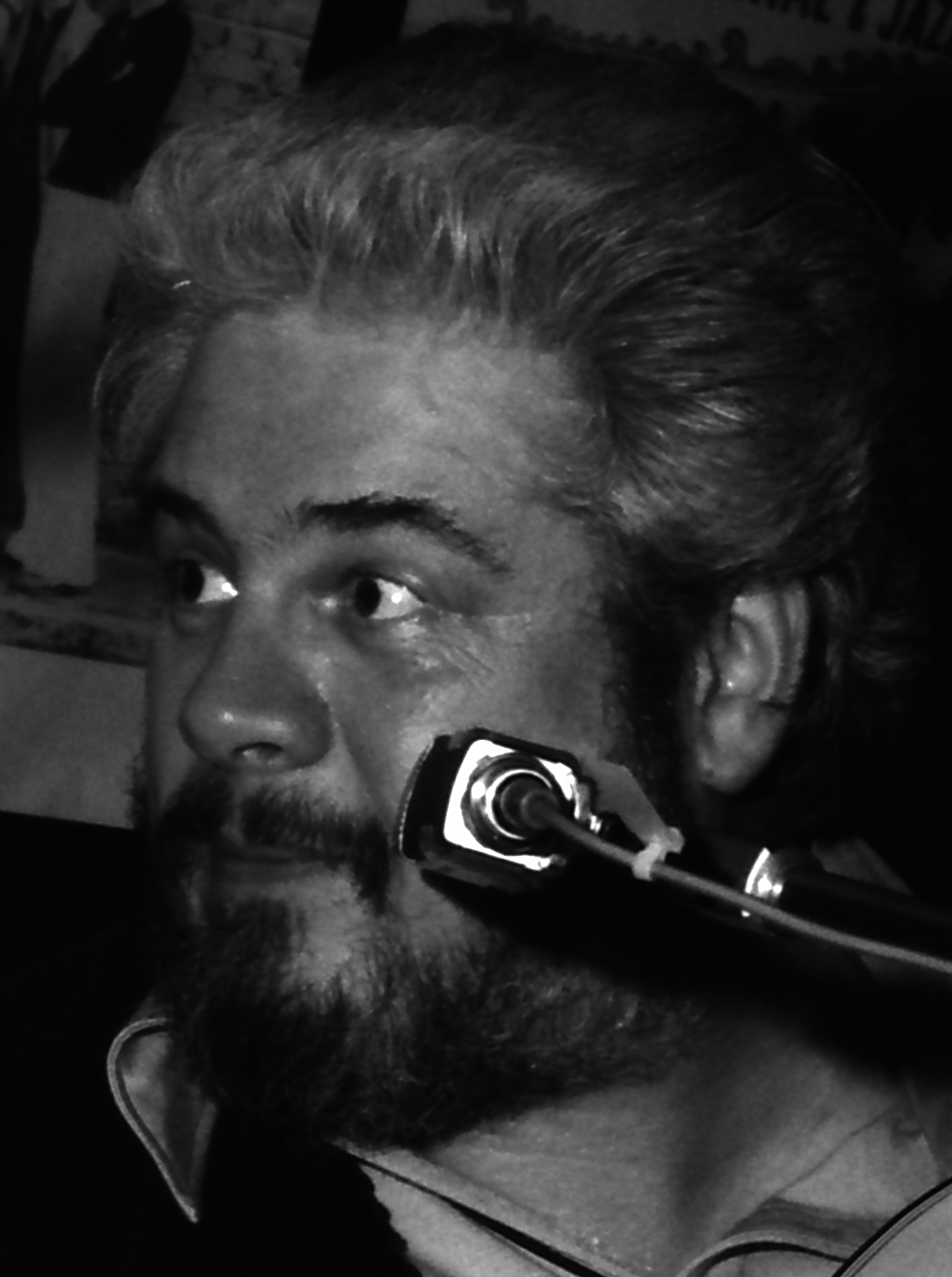
- Ramsey performing in 1977
- English: "Mimi Needs A Thriller When She Goes To Bed"
- Related: Ohne Krimi geht die Mimi nie ins Bett (film)
- Written: 1962
- Text: by Hans Bradtke
- Language: German
- Melody: Heinz Gietz
- Composed: 1962

"Ohne Krimi geht die Mimi nie ins Bett" ("Mimi Needs A Thriller When She Goes To Bed") is a 1962 schlager song with text in German by Hans Bradtke and music by Heinz Gietz, sung by Bill Ramsey.

== History ==
The schlager song "Ohne Krimi geht die Mimi nie ins Bett" was written in 1962, texted by Hans Bradtke and set to music by Heinz Gietz. It deals with a man who is devoid of sleep bcause Mimi, the woman in bed next to him, spends all nights reading crime stories.

The song was first recorded with the German singer Bill Ramsey by Electrola in Cologne on 28 May 1962, produced by Gietz. Electrola published it the same day as a single by its sublabel Columbia, catalogued as 22197. The B side featured the song "Flotter Dampfer". It was the singer's first single with the label, after previously recording for Polydor. Ramsey's version entered the top 50 of the trade journal Musikmarkt on 6 October, remaining for 14 weeks, four of those as No. 3.

The song became part of a film with the same title that year, directed by Franz Antel and released on 19 October 1962. Ramsey played a small role, performing the song. In response to the song, Dany Mann published a song, "Ich lese abends keinen Krimi", in 1963.

The song was covered by Rainhard Fendrich, on his album Ein Saitensprung, recorded live in 2002 (Sony BMG) Dodo Hug published the song on a 2006 CD Via Mala, paraphrase as "Ohne Krimi geht der Jimmy ...", with changed genders.. Milking the Goatmachine covered the song on their 2014 album Greatest Hits – Covered in Milk.

The song inspired the MIMI awards from the German Booksellers.
