= Teesy =

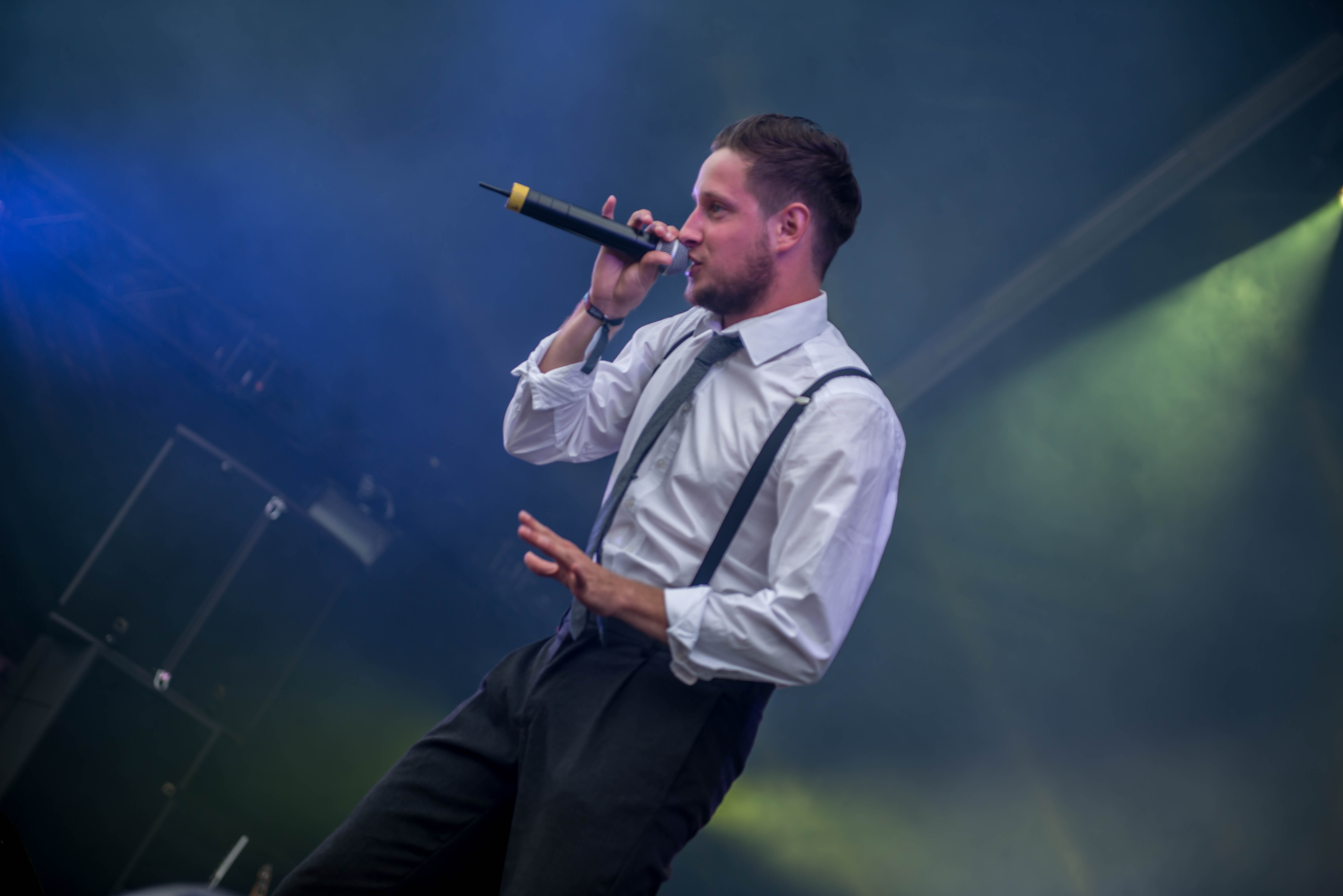

Background information
- Born: Toni Mudrack; 8 December 1990 (age 35); Berlin, Germany
- Genres: Pop; hip hop
- Occupations: Singer; songwriter; rapper

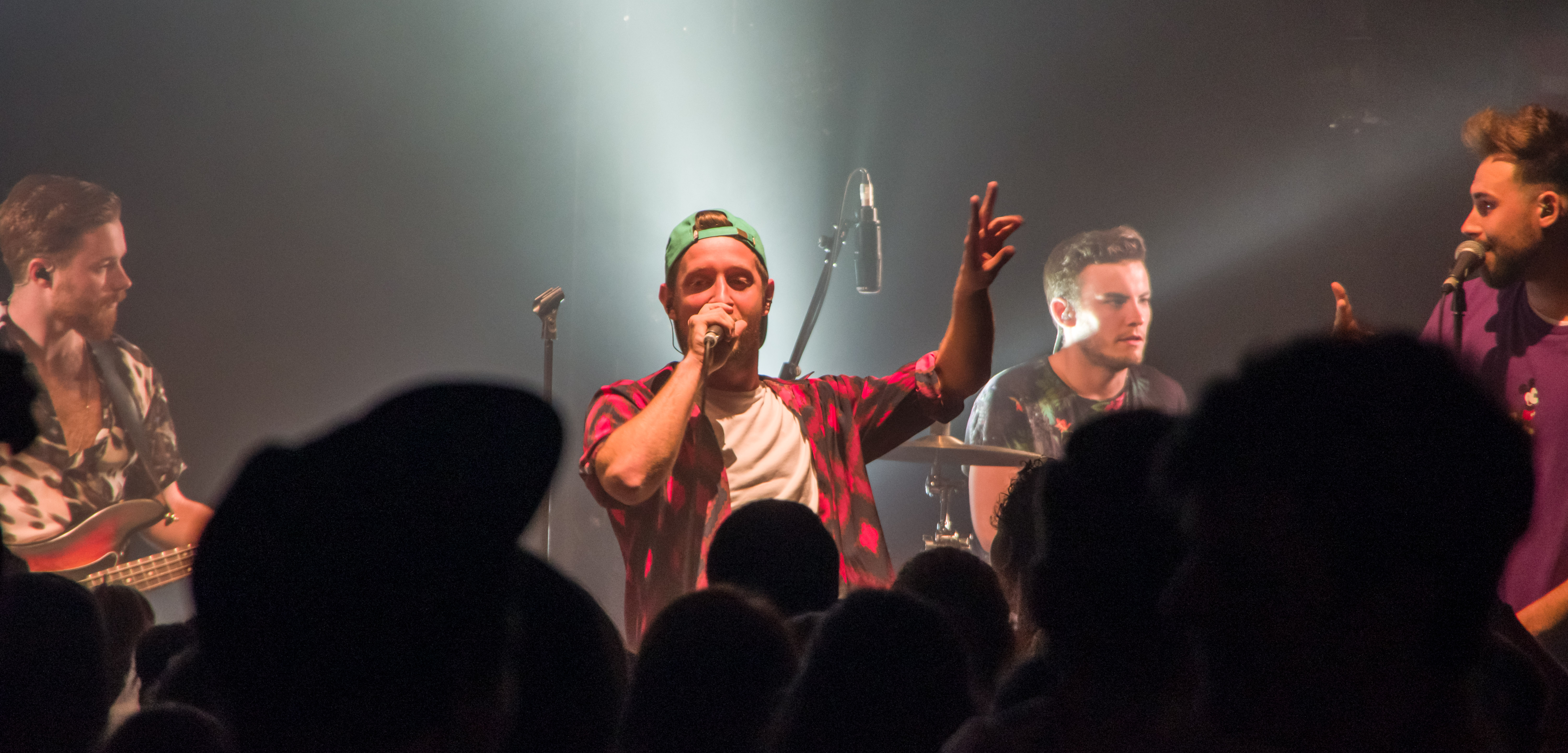
Teesy. Zelt-Musik-Festival 2017 in Freiburg, Germany

Toni Mudrack (born 8 December 1990), better known by his stage name Teesy, is a German singer, songwriter and rapper.

== Discography ==
=== Studio albums ===
List of albums, with selected chart positions, sales figures and certifications
Title	Album details	Peak chart positions		
Title	Album details	GER	AUT	SWI
Glücksrezepte	Released: 2014; Label: Chimperator Productions; Format: CD, digital download	34	55	71
Wünschdirwas	Released: 2016; Label: Chimperator Productions; Format: CD, digital download	7	42	74
Tones	Released: 2018; Label: Chimperator Productions; Format: CD, digital download	17	—	—
