= Let's Dance (German TV series) season 14 =

Let's Dance
- Season 14
- Celebrity winner: Rúrik Gíslason
- Professional winner: Renata Lusin
- No. of episodes: 13

Release
- Original network: RTL
- Original release: 26 February (launch); 5 March 2021 – 28 May 2021

Season chronology
- ← Previous; Season 13 Next → Season 15

The fourteenth season of Let's Dance started on February 26, 2021 with the launch show on RTL, with the first regular show starting on March 5, 2021. Daniel Hartwich and Victoria Swarovski returned as hosts. Joachim Llambi, Motsi Mabuse and Jorge González returned as judges.

Like in the previous season during the launch show the 14 celebrities found out which professional dancer they will dance with for the next few weeks.

Dancing Stars 2021 were Rúrik Gíslason & Renata Lusin.

== Couples ==
On January 16, 2021, RTL announced the 14 celebrities which will participate this season. Once again after Kerstin Ott in Season 12 a same-sex couple will participate with former Prince Charming Nicolas Puschmann. On February 11, 2021 the professional dancers of the season were announced.

After winning the Profi-Challenge in 2020 either Christina Luft or Christian Polanc will have the chance to choose their partner.

Celebrity	Known for	Professional partner	Status
Vanessa Neigert	Singer	Alexandru Ionel	Eliminated 1st on March 5, 2021
Kim Riekenberg	Model	Pasha Zvychaynyy	Eliminated 2nd on March 12, 2021
Senna Gammour	Former Monrose singer & comedian	Robert Beitsch	Eliminated 3rd on March 19, 2021
Kai Ebel	Journalist	Kathrin Menzinger	Eliminated 4th on March 26, 2021
Erol Sander	Actor	Marta Arndt	Eliminated 5th on April 9, 2021
Mickie Krause	Singer-songwriter	Malika Dzumaev	Eliminated 6th on April 16, 2021
Jan Hofer	Broadcaster	Christina Luft	Eliminated 7th on April 23, 2021
Ilse DeLange	Singer-songwriter	Evgeny Vinokurov	Withdrew on May 3, 2021
Lola Weippert	Television & radio presenter	Christian Polanc	Eliminated 8th on May 7, 2021
Auma Obama	Sociologist & activist	Andrzej Cibis	Eliminated 9th on May 14, 2021
Simon Zachenhuber	Professional boxer	Patricija Belousova	Eliminated 10th on May 21, 2021
Nicolas Puschmann	Prince Charming star	Vadim Garbuzov	Third place on May 28, 2021
Valentina Pahde	Gute Zeiten, schlechte Zeiten actress	Valentin Lusin	Runner-Up on May 28, 2021
Rúrik Gíslason	Soccer player	Renata Lusin	Winner on May 28, 2021

== Scoring chart ==
Couple	Place	1	2	1+2	3	4	5	6	7	8	9	10	11	12	13
Rúrik & Renata	1	18	24	42	27	30	26+6=32	29	22	30+16=46	26+8=34	27+26=53	30+25=55	30+30+22=82	29+30+30=89
Valentina & Valentin	2	21	23	44	30	22	27+9=36	30	27	30+16=46	27+6=33	30+27=57	30+26=56	25+29+26=80	30+30+30=90
Nicolas & Vadim	3	16	18	34	21	28	30+6=36	29	30	23+16=39	27+4=31	29+25=54	28+27=55	25+24+27=76	27+30+28=85
Simon & Patricija	4	16	19	35	15	19	23+6=29	20	19	18+16=34	22+2=24	22+25=47	16+20=36	25+22+21=68	
Auma & Andrzej	5	11	12	23	23	17	19+9=28	16	22	18+15=33	19+3=22	21+29=50	19+23=42		
Lola & Christian	6	12	19	31	21	21	23+9=32	22	22	19+16=35	27+10=37	19+26=45			
Ilse & Evgeny	7	14	18	32	17	20	26+9=35	25	23	—	24+1=25	—			
Jan & Christina	8	10	10	20	10	12	10+6=16	12	8	12+15=27					
Mickie & Malika	9	9	7	16	11	13	11+6=17	16	16						
Erol & Marta	10	12	18	30	12	17	14+6=20	13							
Kai & Kathrin	11	9	10	19	13	13	10+6=16								
Senna & Robert	12	11	14	25	12	16									
Kim & Pasha	13	10	23	33	10										
Vanessa & Alexandru	14	12	9	21											

Red numbers indicates the lowest score for each week.
Green numbers indicates the highest score for each week.
indicates the couple eliminated that week.
indicates the returning couple that finished in the bottom two.
indicates the couple which was immune from elimination.
indicates the couple that didn't perform due to personal reasons.
indicates the couple that withdrew from the competition.
indicates the couple was eliminated but later returned to the competition.
indicates the winning couple.
indicates the runner-up couple.
indicates the third-place couple.

=== Averages ===
This table only counts for dances scored on a traditional 30-points scale.

Rank by average	Place	Couple	Total	Dances	Average
1	2	Valentina & Valentin	520	19	27.4
2	1	Rúrik & Renata	511	19	26.9
3	3	Nicolas & Vadim	492	19	25.9
4	6	Lola & Christian	231	11	21.0
5	7	Ilse & Evgeny	167	8	20.9
6	4	Simon & Patricija	322	16	20.1
7	5	Auma & Andrzej	249	13	19.2
8	10	Erol & Marta	86	6	14.3
8	13	Kim & Pasha	43	3	14.3
10	12	Senna & Robert	53	4	13.3
11	9	Mickie & Malika	83	7	11.9
12	11	Kai & Kathrin	55	5	11.0
13	8	Jan & Christina	84	8	10.5
13	14	Vanessa & Alexandru	21	2	10.5

== Highest and lowest scoring performances ==
The best and worst performances in each dance according to the judges' marks are as follows:

Dance	Best dancer(s)	Best score	Worst dancer(s)	Worst score
Cha-cha-cha	Rúrik Gíslason	30	Mickie Krause	7
Tango	Rúrik Gíslason	29	Kai Ebel	9
Salsa	Nicolas Puschmann	28	Vanessa Neigert	9
Quickstep	Valentina Pahde	30	Kai Ebel	10
Viennese waltz	Valentina Pahde	30	Mickie Krause	9
Waltz	Nicolas Puschmann	30	Auma Obama; Jan Hofer	12
Jive	Rúrik Gíslason	30	Jan Hofer	8
Rumba	Valentina Pahde	30	Jan Hofer	10
Paso doble	Rúrik Gíslason	30	Kai Ebel	13
Foxtrot	Valentina Pahde	30	Kai Ebel	10
Contemporary	Nicolas Puschmann; Valentina Pahde; Rúrik Gíslason	30	Simon Zachenhuber	19
Charleston	Rúrik Gíslason; Nicolas Puschmann	30	Mickie Krause	16
Samba	Rúrik Gíslason; Valentina Pahde	26	Jan Hofer	10
Team Dance	Rúrik Gíslason; Simon Zachenhuber; Lola Weippert; Valentina Pahde; Nicolas Puschmann	16	Auma Obama; Jan Hofer	15
Discofox Marathon	Lola Weippert	10	Ilse DeLange	1
Freestyle (Magic Moment)	Valentina Pahde	30	Lola Weippert	19
Bollywood	Valentina Pahde	27	Lola Weippert	26
Street	Auma Obama	29	Nicolas Puschmann	25
Flamenco	Rúrik Gíslason	26	Simon Zachenhuber	25
Freestyle (Finale)	Rúrik Gíslason; Valentina Pahde	30	Nicolas Puschmann	28

== Couples' highest and lowest scoring dances ==
According to the traditional 30-point scale.

Couples	Highest Scoring Dances	Score	Lowest Scoring Dances	Score
Rúrik & Renata	Jive (2x); Cha-cha-cha; Paso doble Charleston; Contemporary; Freestyle	30	Cha-cha-cha	18
Valentina & Valentin	Quickstep; Foxtrot; Viennese waltz (2x); Freestyle (magic moment); Contemporary; Rumba; Freestyle	30	Cha-cha-cha	21
Nicolas & Vadim	Contemporary; Waltz; Charleston	30	Quickstep	16
Simon & Patricija	Flamenco; Tango	25	Cha-cha-cha	15
Auma & Andrzej	Street	29	Tango	11
Lola & Christian	Charleston	27	Salsa	12
Ilse & Evgeny	Charleston	26	Cha-cha-cha	14
Jan & Christina	Tango; Foxtrot; Waltz	12	Jive	8
Mickie & Malika	Salsa; Charleston	16	Cha-cha-cha	7
Erol & Marta	Tango	18	Viennese waltz Cha-cha-cha	12
Kai & Kathrin	Cha-cha-cha; Paso doble	13	Tango	9
Senna & Robert	Foxtrot	16	Salsa	11
Kim & Pasha	Waltz	23	Salsa; Cha-cha-cha	10
Vanessa & Alexandru	Quickstep	12	Salsa	9

== Weekly scores and songs ==
=== Launch show ===
For the fifth time, there was a launch show in which each celebrity met their partner for the first time. This show aired on 26 February 2021. In this first live show the celebrities and the professional partners danced in groups and each celebrity was awarded points by the judges and the viewers. At the end of the show the couple with the highest combined points was granted immunity from the first elimination in the following week.

After Christina Luft and Christian Polanc won the Profi Challenge together the year before, one of them was allowed to choose their celebrity partner. Season 13 Champion Lili Paul-Roncalli drew the lot with Polanc' name. Afterwards Polanc chose Lola Weippert as his celebrity partner.

Key
Celebrity won immunity from the first elimination

The Team dances

Order	Couple	Dance	Music	Judge's Scores			Total
Order	Couple	Dance	Music	Gonzalez	Mabuse	Llambi	Total
1	Ilse DeLange	Cha-cha-cha	"Hot Stuff" - Kygo & Donna Summer	5	5	4	14
1	Valentina Pahde	Cha-cha-cha	"Hot Stuff" - Kygo & Donna Summer	7	7	7	21
1	Rúrik Gíslason	Cha-cha-cha	"Hot Stuff" - Kygo & Donna Summer	6	6	6	18
2	Kai Ebel	Tango	"Perhaps Perhaps Perhaps" - Doris Day	4	4	1	9
2	Auma Obama	Tango	"Perhaps Perhaps Perhaps" - Doris Day	4	5	2	11
2	Simon Zachenhuber	Tango	"Perhaps Perhaps Perhaps" - Doris Day	6	6	4	16
3	Kim Riekenberg	Salsa	"Chantaje" - Shakira ft. Maluma	4	4	2	10
3	Lola Weippert	Salsa	"Chantaje" - Shakira ft. Maluma	4	4	4	12
3	Senna Gammour	Salsa	"Chantaje" - Shakira ft. Maluma	4	4	3	11
4	Vanessa Neigert	Quickstep	"Ich will 'nen Cowboy als Mann" - Gitte Hænning	5	5	2	12
4	Nicolas Puschmann	Quickstep	"Ich will 'nen Cowboy als Mann" - Gitte Hænning	6	6	4	16
5	Erol Sander	Viennese waltz	"That's Life" - Frank Sinatra	5	4	3	12
5	Mickie Krause	Viennese waltz	"That's Life" - Frank Sinatra	4	4	1	9
5	Jan Hofer	Viennese waltz	"That's Life" - Frank Sinatra	4	4	2	10

=== Week 1 ===
Running order

Order	Couple	Dance	Music	Judge's Scores			Total	Result
Order	Couple	Dance	Music	Gonzalez	Mabuse	Llambi	Total	Result
1	Lola & Christian	Quickstep	"Rama Lama Ding Dong" - Rocky Sharpe and the Replays	7	7	5	19	Safe
2	Auma & Andrzej	Waltz	"(You Make Me Feel Like) A Natural Woman" - Aretha Franklin	5	5	2	12	Safe
3	Mickie & Malika	Cha-cha-cha	"Party Rock Anthem" - LMFAO feat. Lauren Bennett & GoonRock	3	3	1	7	Safe
4	Vanessa & Alexandru	Salsa	"Tres Deseos" - Gloria Estefan	4	4	1	9	Eliminated
5	Ilse & Evgeny	Viennese waltz	"One and Only" - Adele	7	6	5	18	Safe
6	Senna & Robert	Tango	"Shut Up" - Black Eyed Peas	6	5	3	14	Bottom three
7	Nicolas & Vadim	Cha-cha-cha	"It's Raining Men" - The Weather Girls	6	6	6	18	Safe
8	Jan & Christina	Cha-cha-cha	"Don't Go Breaking My Heart" - Elton John	4	4	2	10	Safe
9	Kim & Pasha	Waltz	"I'm Kissing You" - Des'ree	8	8	7	23	Safe
10	Valentina & Valentin	Tango	"The Kiss Of Fire" - Louis Armstrong	8	8	7	23	Safe
11	Kai & Kathrin	Quickstep	"Im Wagen vor mir" - Henry Valentino	4	4	2	10	Bottom two
12	Simon & Patricija	Viennese waltz	"Keine Rosen" - Teesy	8	7	4	19	Safe
13	Erol & Marta	Tango	"Vier Jahreszeiten: Winter" - Antonio Vivaldi	7	6	5	18	Safe
14	Rúrik & Renata	Salsa	"Vivir Mi Vida" - Marc Anthony	8	8	8	24	Immune

=== Week 2 ===
Running order

Order	Couple	Dance	Music	Judge's Scores			Total	Result
Order	Couple	Dance	Music	Gonzalez	Mabuse	Llambi	Total	Result
1	Simon & Patricija	Cha-cha-cha	"Take you dancing" - Jason Derulo	5	6	4	15	Safe
2	Auma & Andrzej	Salsa	"Quimbara" - Celia & Johnny	8	8	7	23	Safe
3	Nicolas & Vadim	Tango	"Breaking Me" - Topic & A7S	8	7	6	21	Safe
4	Senna & Robert	Jive	"Einmal um die Welt" - Cro	5	5	2	12	Bottom three
5	Ilse & Evgeny	Rumba	"Time After Time" - Eva Cassidy (Cover)	6	6	5	17	Safe
6	Erol & Marta	Cha-cha-cha	"You're the first, the last, my everything" - Barry White	5	5	2	12	Safe
7	Kai & Kathrin	Cha-cha-cha	"Sex Bomb" - Tom Jones & Mousse T.	5	5	3	13	Safe
8	Lola & Christian	Tango	"Whatever Lola wants" - Sarah Vaughan	8	7	6	21	Safe
9	Mickie & Malika	Quickstep	"Help!" - The Beatles	4	4	3	11	Safe
10	Jan & Christina	Rumba	"Always on my mind" - Elvis Presley	4	4	2	10	Bottom two
11	Rúrik & Renata	Viennese waltz	"Powerful" - Major Lazer feat. Ellie Goulding & Tarrus Riley	10	9	8	27	Safe
12	Kim & Pasha	Cha-cha-cha	"Head Shoulders Knees & Toes" - Ofenbach & Quarterhead feat. Norma Jean Martine	4	4	2	10	Eliminated
13	Valentina & Valentin	Quickstep	"Whatever it takes" - Milow	10	10	10	30	Safe

=== Week 3 ===
Theme: The Year I was born

Running order

Order	Couple	Dance	Music	Judge's Scores			Total	Result
Order	Couple	Dance	Music	Gonzalez	Mabuse	Llambi	Total	Result
1	Lola & Christian	Jive	"Wannabe" - Spice Girls	8	7	6	21	Safe
2	Erol & Marta	Viennese waltz	"Nights in White Satin" - The Moody Blues	7	6	4	17	Bottom three
3	Kai & Kathrin	Paso doble	"You Really Got Me" - The Kinks	5	5	3	13	Bottom two
4	Nicolas & Vadim	Foxtrot	"Enter Sandman" - Metallica	10	10	8	28	Safe
5	Auma & Andrzej	Foxtrot	"Will You Love Me Tomorrow" - The Shirelles	7	6	4	17	Safe
6	Simon & Patricija	Contemporary	"I Don't Want To Miss A Thing" - Aerosmith	6	7	6	19	Safe
7	Jan & Christina	Tango	"Rote Rosen, Rote Lippen, Roter Wein" - René Carol	5	5	2	12	Bottom four
8	Valentina & Valentin	Rumba	"Endless Love" - Luther Vandross feat. Mariah Carey	8	7	7	22	Safe
9	Senna & Robert	Foxtrot	"I Was Made For Loving You" - Kiss	6	6	4	16	Eliminated
10	Ilse & Evgeny	Cha-cha-cha	"Yes Sir, I Can Boogie" - Baccara	7	7	6	20	Safe
11	Mickie & Malika	Rumba	"Your Song" - Elton John	5	5	3	13	Safe
12	Rúrik & Renata	Jive	"Don't Worry, Be Happy" - Bobby McFerrin	10	10	10	30	Safe

=== Week 4 ===
Running order

Order	Couple	Dance	Music	Judge's Scores			Total	Result
Order	Couple	Dance	Music	Gonzalez	Mabuse	Llambi	Total	Result
1	Auma & Andrzej	Cha-cha-cha	"Disco Inferno" - Tina Turner	7	7	5	19	Safe
2	Erol & Marta	Rumba	"Te Busco" - Celia Cruz	6	5	3	14	Safe
3	Ilse & Evgeny	Charleston	"Baby Face" - Julie Andrews	9	9	8	26	Safe
4	Lola & Christian	Viennese waltz	"Stuck with U" - Ariana Grande ft. Justin Bieber	8	8	7	23	Safe
5	Mickie & Malika	Tango	"The Pink Panther Theme" - Henry Mancini	4	4	3	11	Bottom two
6	Kai & Kathrin	Foxtrot	"Ich brech' die Herzen der stolzesten Frau'n" - Heinz Rühmann	4	4	2	10	Eliminated
7	Simon & Patricija	Paso doble	"Uccen" - Taalbi Brothers	8	8	7	23	Safe
8	Jan & Christina	Samba	"Help Yourself" - Tom Jones	4	4	2	10	Bottom three
9	Rúrik & Renata	Tango	"Believer" - Imagine Dragons	9	9	8	26	Safe
10	Valentina & Valentin	Salsa	"Flor Palida" - Marc Anthony	9	9	9	27	Safe
11	Nicolas & Vadim	Contemporary	"Unsteady" - X Ambassadors	10	10	10	30	Safe
Boys vs Girls Battle
1	Team Boys	Freestyle	"Rasputin" - Boney M./ "Push It" - Salt-N-Pepa/ "The Winner Takes It All" - ABBA/ "We Are the Champions" - Queen	6				The Girls won the Boys vs Girls Battle
2	Team Girls	Freestyle	"Rasputin" - Boney M./ "Push It" - Salt-N-Pepa/ "The Winner Takes It All" - ABBA/ "We Are the Champions" - Queen	9				The Girls won the Boys vs Girls Battle

=== Week 5 ===
- Theme: Summer Party
- The show aired on April 9 because of the Easter holidays.

Running order

Order	Couple	Dance	Music	Judge's Scores			Total	Result
Order	Couple	Dance	Music	Gonzalez	Mabuse	Llambi	Total	Result
1	Lola & Christian	Salsa	"Margarita" - Wilkens	8	8	6	22	Bottom two
2	Jan & Christina	Foxtrot	"Summerwind" - Frank Sinatra	5	5	2	12	Safe
3	Nicolas & Vadim	Charleston	"Du hast den Farbfilm vergessen" - Nina Hagen	10	10	9	29	Safe
4	Ilse & Evgeny	Tango	"Voyage, Voyage" - Desireless	9	9	7	25	Safe
5	Auma & Andrzej	Rumba	"Kokomo" - The Beach Boys	7	7	2	16	Safe
6	Simon & Patricija	Jive	"Escape" - Rupert Holmes	8	6	6	20	Safe
7	Erol & Marta	Samba	"All Night Long" - Lionel Richie	6	5	2	13	Eliminated
8	Mickie & Malika	Salsa	"Tequila" - The Champs	6	6	4	16	Bottom three
9	Valentina & Valentin	Foxtrot	"Sunny" - Boney M.	10	10	10	30	Safe
10	Rúrik & Renata	Quickstep	"Summer in the City" - The Lovin' Spoonful	10	10	9	29	Safe

=== Week 6 ===
Running order

Order	Couple	Dance	Music	Judge's Scores			Total	Result
Order	Couple	Dance	Music	Gonzalez	Mabuse	Llambi	Total	Result
1	Ilse & Evgeny	Quickstep	"Suddenly I See" - KT Tunstall	8	8	7	23	Safe
2	Auma & Andrzej	Charleston	"Bang Bang" - Will.i.am	8	8	6	22	Safe
3	Simon & Patricija	Foxtrot	"Power Over Me" - Dermot Kennedy	7	7	5	19	Bottom two
4	Valentina & Valentin	Jive	"One Fine Day" - The Chiffons	9	9	9	27	Safe
5	Lola & Christian	Cha-cha-cha	"My Head & My Heart" - Ava Max	8	8	6	22	Safe
6	Mickie & Malika	Charleston	"Schmidtchen Schleicher" - Nico Haak	6	6	4	16	Eliminated
7	Jan & Christina	Jive	"Forever Young" - The Baseballs	3	4	1	8	Bottom three
8	Rúrik & Renata	Rumba	"Wicked Game" - Grace Carter	8	8	6	22	Safe
9	Nicolas & Vadim	Waltz	"At This Moment" - Michael Bublé	10	10	10	30	Safe

=== Week 7 ===
Theme: Love week

- Ilse did not dance this week due to an injury.

Running order

Order	Couple	Dance	Music	Judge's Scores			Total	Result
Order	Couple	Dance	Music	Gonzalez	Mabuse	Llambi	Total	Result
1	Auma & Andrzej	Samba	Zuchu, Diamond Platnumz - Cheche	7	7	4	18	Safe
2	Simon & Patricija	Salsa	Loco Escrito - Amame	6	7	5	18	Safe
3	Valentina & Valentin	Viennese waltz	Meghan Trainor - What If I	10	10	10	30	Safe
4	Lola & Christian	Rumba	Nea - Some Say	7	7	5	19	Bottom two
5	Ilse & Evgeny	Salsa	Daniela Darcount - Sañor Mentira	Not performed due to injury				Given bye
6	Jan & Christina	Waltz	The Commodores - Three Times A Lady	5	5	2	12	Eliminated
7	Rúrik & Renata	Cha-cha-cha	Ricky Martin - Amor	10	10	10	30	Safe
8	Nicolas & Vadim	Samba	Pitbull, Chesca, Frankie Valli - Te Quiero Baby	8	8	7	23	Safe
Teams Battle
1	Team Mabuse; Auma & Andrzej; Jan & Christina	Freestyle	Ariana Grande, Stevie Wonder - Faith; OR; Moulin Rouge - El Tango De Roxanne	8	X	7	15	Team Gonzalez and Team Llambi won the Teams Battle
2	Team Gonzalez; Rúrik & Renata; Simon & Patricija	Freestyle	Bonga - Paxi Ni Ngongo; Los Van Van - Que Paso Es Ese; Shakira, Twocolors - Girl Like Me	X	9	7	16	Team Gonzalez and Team Llambi won the Teams Battle
3	Team Llambi; Lola & Christian; Valentina & Valentin; Nicolas & Vadim	Freestyle	John Miles - Music	7	9	X	16	Team Gonzalez and Team Llambi won the Teams Battle

=== Week 8 ===
Running order

Order	Couple	Dance	Music	Judge's Scores			Total	Result
Order	Couple	Dance	Music	Gonzalez	Mabuse	Llambi	Total	Result
1	Nicolas & Vadim	Quickstep	"Wonderwall" - Oasis	10	9	8	27	Eliminated
2	Lola & Christian	Charleston	"Bom Bom" - Sam and the Womp	10	9	8	27	Safe
3	Auma & Andrzej	Paso doble	"Run the World (Girls)" - Beyoncé	7	7	5	19	Bottom three
4	Ilse & Evgeny	Contemporary	"Take Me to Church" - Jasmine Thompson	9	8	7	24	Bottom two
5	Simon & Patricija	Rumba	"Vermissen" - Juju und Henning May	8	8	6	22	Safe
6	Rúrik & Renata	Samba	"Iko Iko" - Justin Wellington and Small Jam	9	9	8	26	Safe
7	Valentina & Valentin	Charleston	"Hot Honey Rag" - Chicago Orchestra	9	9	9	27	Safe
Discofox Marathon
	Ilse & Evgeny	Discofox Marathon	"Schatzi schenk mir ein Foto!" - Mickie Krause feat. Ko&Ko "Eine Woche wach" - Mickie Krause "Biste braun kriegste Fraun" - Mickie Krause "Reiss die Hütte ab!" - Mickie Krause "Nur noch Schuhe an" - Mickie Krause "Jan Pillemann Otze" - Mickie Krause "Geh mal Bier hol’n (GmBh)" - Mickie Krause	1				Lola & Christian won the Discofox Marathon
	Simon & Patricija	Discofox Marathon	"Schatzi schenk mir ein Foto!" - Mickie Krause feat. Ko&Ko "Eine Woche wach" - Mickie Krause "Biste braun kriegste Fraun" - Mickie Krause "Reiss die Hütte ab!" - Mickie Krause "Nur noch Schuhe an" - Mickie Krause "Jan Pillemann Otze" - Mickie Krause "Geh mal Bier hol’n (GmBh)" - Mickie Krause	2				Lola & Christian won the Discofox Marathon
	Auma & Andrzej	Discofox Marathon	"Schatzi schenk mir ein Foto!" - Mickie Krause feat. Ko&Ko "Eine Woche wach" - Mickie Krause "Biste braun kriegste Fraun" - Mickie Krause "Reiss die Hütte ab!" - Mickie Krause "Nur noch Schuhe an" - Mickie Krause "Jan Pillemann Otze" - Mickie Krause "Geh mal Bier hol’n (GmBh)" - Mickie Krause	3				Lola & Christian won the Discofox Marathon
	Nicolas & Vadim	Discofox Marathon	"Schatzi schenk mir ein Foto!" - Mickie Krause feat. Ko&Ko "Eine Woche wach" - Mickie Krause "Biste braun kriegste Fraun" - Mickie Krause "Reiss die Hütte ab!" - Mickie Krause "Nur noch Schuhe an" - Mickie Krause "Jan Pillemann Otze" - Mickie Krause "Geh mal Bier hol’n (GmBh)" - Mickie Krause	4				Lola & Christian won the Discofox Marathon
	Valentina & Valentin	Discofox Marathon	"Schatzi schenk mir ein Foto!" - Mickie Krause feat. Ko&Ko "Eine Woche wach" - Mickie Krause "Biste braun kriegste Fraun" - Mickie Krause "Reiss die Hütte ab!" - Mickie Krause "Nur noch Schuhe an" - Mickie Krause "Jan Pillemann Otze" - Mickie Krause "Geh mal Bier hol’n (GmBh)" - Mickie Krause	6				Lola & Christian won the Discofox Marathon
	Rúrik & Renata	Discofox Marathon	"Schatzi schenk mir ein Foto!" - Mickie Krause feat. Ko&Ko "Eine Woche wach" - Mickie Krause "Biste braun kriegste Fraun" - Mickie Krause "Reiss die Hütte ab!" - Mickie Krause "Nur noch Schuhe an" - Mickie Krause "Jan Pillemann Otze" - Mickie Krause "Geh mal Bier hol’n (GmBh)" - Mickie Krause	8				Lola & Christian won the Discofox Marathon
	Lola & Christian	Discofox Marathon	"Schatzi schenk mir ein Foto!" - Mickie Krause feat. Ko&Ko "Eine Woche wach" - Mickie Krause "Biste braun kriegste Fraun" - Mickie Krause "Reiss die Hütte ab!" - Mickie Krause "Nur noch Schuhe an" - Mickie Krause "Jan Pillemann Otze" - Mickie Krause "Geh mal Bier hol’n (GmBh)" - Mickie Krause	10				Lola & Christian won the Discofox Marathon

=== Week 9 ===
Theme: Magic Moments

- Ilse DeLange withdrew from the competition due to an injury. Nicolas Puschmann returned to the competition.

Running order

Order	Couple	Dance	Music	Judge's Scores			Total	Result
Order	Couple	Dance	Music	Gonzalez	Mabuse	Llambi	Total	Result
1	Lola & Christian	Freestyle	Medley: Loren Allred – Never Enough • Zac Efron feat. Zendaya – Rewrite The Stars	7	7	5	19	Eliminated
2	Auma & Andrzej	Freestyle	Medley: Nina Simone – Feeling Good • Celia Cruz – La Negra Tiene Tumbao	7	7	7	21	Bottom two
3	Rúrik & Renata	Freestyle	Carmen Twillie feat. Lebo M. – Circle Of Life	9	9	9	27	Safe
4	Simon & Patricija	Freestyle	Pizzera & Jaus – Mama	8	8	6	22	Bottom three
5	Valentina & Valentin	Freestyle	Disclosure feat. Eliza Doolittle – "You & Me" (Flume Remix)	10	10	10	30	Safe
6	Nicolas & Vadim	Freestyle	Medley: Diana Ross – I'm Coming Out • Marvin Gaye feat. Tammi Terrell – Ain't No Mountain High Enough	10	10	9	29	Safe
Battles
1	Lola & Christian	Bollywood	Panjabi MC – Jogi	9	9	8	26	Valentina & Valentin won the Dance Duel
1	Valentina & Valentin	Bollywood	Panjabi MC – Jogi	9	9	9	27	Valentina & Valentin won the Dance Duel
2	Auma & Andrzej	Street	Black Eyed Peas feat. J Balvin – RITMO	10	10	9	29	Auma & Andrzej won the Dance Duel
2	Nicolas & Vadim	Street	Black Eyed Peas feat. J Balvin – RITMO	9	9	7	25	Auma & Andrzej won the Dance Duel
3	Rúrik & Renata	Flamenco	Chico & The Gypsies feat. Leo Rojas – Don't Let Me Be Misunderstood	9	9	8	26	Rúrik & Renata won the Dance Duel
3	Simon & Patricija	Flamenco	Chico & The Gypsies feat. Leo Rojas – Don't Let Me Be Misunderstood	8	8	9	25	Rúrik & Renata won the Dance Duel

=== Week 10 ===
Running order

Order	Couple	Dance	Music	Judge's Scores			Total	Result
Order	Couple	Dance	Music	Gonzalez	Mabuse	Llambi	Total	Result
1	Auma & Andrzej	Quickstep	"Cabaret" - Liza Minnelli	7	7	5	19	Eliminated
2	Simon & Patricija	Samba	"Vente Pa' Ca" - Ricky Martin und Maluma	6	6	4	16	Bottom two
3	Rúrik & Renata	Paso doble	"Hanuman" - Rodrigo y Gabriela	10	10	10	30	Safe
4	Nicolas & Vadim	Salsa	"Aguanile" - Marc Anthony	9	10	9	28	Safe
5	Valentina & Valentin	Contemporary	"Little Runaway" - Celeste	10	10	10	30	Safe
Trio-Dance
1	Auma & Andrzej (with Robert Beitsch)	Tango	"Sway" - Michael Bublé	8	8	7	23	
2	Rúrik & Renata (with Malika Dzumaev)	Foxtrot	"Poker Face" - Lady Gaga	8	9	8	25	
3	Simon & Patricija (with Christina Luft)	Charleston	"Singin' in the Rain" - Gene Kelly	7	7	6	20	
4	Valentina & Valentin (with Evgeny Vinokurov)	Samba	"Light It Up" - Major Lazer	9	9	8	26	
5	Nicolas & Vadim (with Kathrin Menzinger)	Rumba	"Human" von The Human League	9	9	9	27	

=== Week 11: Semi-final ===
Running order

Order	Couple	Dance	Music	Judge's Scores			Total	Result
Order	Couple	Dance	Music	Gonzalez	Mabuse	Llambi	Total	Result
1	Nicolas & Vadim	Jive	"Great Balls Of Fire" - Jerry Lee Lewis	9	9	7	25	Bottom two
1	Nicolas & Vadim	Paso doble	"Boléro" - Maurice Ravel	9	9	6	24	Bottom two
2	Simon & Patricija	Tango	"What is Love" - Haddaway	9	9	7	25	Eliminated
2	Simon & Patricija	Quickstep	"Wer wenn nicht wir" - Wincent Weiss	8	8	6	22	Eliminated
3	Valentina & Valentin	Cha-cha-cha	"Ladida" - CRISPIE x ILIRA	9	8	8	25	Safe
3	Valentina & Valentin	Paso doble	"The Hanging Tree" - James Newton Howard & Jennifer Lawrence	10	10	9	29	Safe
4	Rúrik & Renata	Charleston	"The Ding Dong Daddy of the D Car Line" - Cherry Poppin' Daddies	10	10	10	30	Safe
4	Rúrik & Renata	Contemporary	"Bruises" - Lewis Capaldi	10	10	10	30	Safe
Impro Dance Even More Extreme
1	Simon & Patricija	Salsa	"La Rebellion" - Joe Arroyo	7	8	6	21	
2	Valentina & Valentin	Waltz	"What The World Needs Now" - Dionne Warwick	9	9	8	26	
3	Rúrik & Renata	Rumba	"Because of You" - Kelly Clarkson	8	8	6	22	
4	Nicolas & Vadim	Foxtrot	"You Can Leave Your Hat On" - Joe Cocker	9	9	9	27	

=== Week 12: Final ===
- Theme: Judges' Choice, Favorite dance & Freestyle

Running order

Order	Couple	Dance	Music	Judge's Scores			Total	Result
Order	Couple	Dance	Music	Gonzalez	Mabuse	Llambi	Total	Result
1	Nicolas & Vadim	Tango	"Neruda" - Rupa & The April Fishes	9	9	9	27	Third place
1	Nicolas & Vadim	Charleston	"Du hast den Farbfilm vergessen" - Nina Hagen	10	10	10	30	Third place
1	Nicolas & Vadim	Freestyle	Medley from The Rocky Horror Picture Show	9	10	9	28	Third place
2	Valentina & Valentin	Rumba	"No Se Por Que Te Quiero" - Ana Belén & Antonio Banderas	10	10	10	30	Runner-up
2	Valentina & Valentin	Viennese waltz	"What If I"-Meghan Trainor	10	10	10	30	Runner-up
2	Valentina & Valentin	Freestyle	Medley of Marilyn Monroe songs	10	10	10	30	Runner-up
3	Rúrik & Renata	Tango	"Let's Dance" - David Bowie	10	10	9	29	Winner
3	Rúrik & Renata	Jive	"Don't Worry, Be Happy" - Bobby McFerrin	10	10	10	30	Winner
3	Rúrik & Renata	Freestyle	Medley of songs with the theme "Thor"	10	10	10	30	Winner

== Dance chart ==
Highest scoring dance
Lowest scoring dance
Was not scored (encore performance in the finale)
The pair did not perform this week

Couple	Launch	Week 1	Week 2	Week 3	Week 4		Week 5	Week 6	Week 7		Week 8		Week 9		Week 10		Week 11			Week 12		
Rúrik & Renata	Cha-cha-cha	Salsa	Viennese waltz	Jive	Tango	Freestyle	Quickstep	Rumba	Cha-cha-cha	Team Gonzalez	Samba	Discofox	Freestyle	Flamenco	Paso doble	Foxtrot	Charleston	Contemporary	Rumba	Tango	Jive	Freestyle
Valentina & Valentin	Cha-cha-cha	Tango	Quickstep	Rumba	Salsa	Freestyle	Foxtrot	Jive	Viennese waltz	Team Llambi	Charleston	Discofox	Freestyle	Bollywood	Contemporary	Samba	Cha-cha-cha	Paso doble	Waltz	Rumba	Viennese waltz	Freestyle
Nicolas & Vadim	Quickstep	Cha-cha-cha	Tango	Foxtrot	Contemporary	Freestyle	Charleston	Waltz	Samba	Team Llambi	Quickstep	Discofox	Freestyle	Street	Salsa	Rumba	Jive	Paso doble	Foxtrot	Tango	Charleston	Freestyle
Simon & Patricija	Tango	Viennese waltz	Cha-cha-cha	Contemporary	Paso doble	Freestyle	Jive	Foxtrot	Salsa	Team Gonzalez	Rumba	Discofox	Freestyle	Flamenco	Samba	Charleston	Tango	Quickstep	Salsa			
Auma & Andrzej	Tango	Waltz	Salsa	Foxtrot	Cha-cha-cha	Freestyle	Rumba	Charleston	Samba	Team Mabuse	Paso doble	Discofox	Freestyle	Street	Quickstep	Tango						
Lola & Christian	Salsa	Quickstep	Tango	Jive	Viennese waltz	Freestyle	Salsa	Cha-cha-cha	Rumba	Team Llambi	Charleston	Discofox	Freestyle	Bollywood								
Ilse & Evgeny	Cha-cha-cha	Viennese waltz	Rumba	Cha-cha-cha	Charleston	Freestyle	Tango	Quickstep	Salsa	Team Mabuse	Contemporary	Discofox										
Jan & Christina	Viennese waltz	Cha-cha-cha	Rumba	Tango	Samba	Freestyle	Foxtrot	Jive	Waltz	Team Mabuse												
Mickie & Malika	Viennese waltz	Cha-cha-cha	Quickstep	Rumba	Tango	Freestyle	Salsa	Charleston														
Erol & Marta	Viennese waltz	Tango	Cha-cha-cha	Viennese waltz	Rumba	Freestyle	Samba															
Kai & Kathrin	Tango	Quickstep	Cha-cha-cha	Paso doble	Foxtrot	Freestyle																
Senna & Robert	Salsa	Tango	Jive	Foxtrot																		
Kim & Pasha	Salsa	Waltz	Cha-cha-cha																			
Vanessa & Alexandru	Quickstep	Salsa																				
