= Let's Dance (German TV series) season 13 =

Let's Dance
- Season 13
- Celebrity winner: Lili Paul-Roncalli
- Professional winner: Massimo Sinato
- No. of episodes: 13

Release
- Original network: RTL
- Original release: 21 February (launch); 28 February 2020 – 22 May 2020

Season chronology
- ← Previous; Season 12 Next → Season 14

The thirteenth season of Let's Dance started on February 21, 2020, and ended on May 22, 2020, on RTL. Daniel Hartwich and Victoria Swarovski returned as hosts. Joachim Llambi, Motsi Mabuse and Jorge González returned as the judges.

Dancing Stars 2020 were Lili Paul-Roncalli & Massimo Sinato.

Due to the COVID-19 epidemic in Germany, in week 3 on Friday 13 March 2020 in the studio were only family and Friends and beginning with week 4 on Friday 20 March 2020 and continuing indefinitely, all live shows aired without the audience in the studio. In the final were family and Friends in the studio, also the couples that were already eliminated were there.

== Couples ==
On January 15, 2020, RTL announced the 14 Let's Dance-celebrities to be participating in the series and on February 6, 2020, were announced the Let's Dance-professional partners. At the end of the Launch show were announced the 14 couples.

Celebrity	Known for	Professional partner	Status
Steffi Jones	Soccer player	Robert Beitsch	Eliminated 1st on February 28, 2020
Sabrina Setlur	Rapper	Nikita Kuzmin	Eliminated 2nd on March 6, 2020
Aílton	Soccer player	Isabel Edvardsson	Eliminated 3rd on March 13, 2020
John Kelly	The Kelly Family singer	Regina Luca	Withdrew on March 24, 2020
Sükrü Pehlivan	Television presenter	Alona Uehlin	Eliminated 5th on March 27, 2020
Ulrike von der Groeben	Television presenter	Valentin Lusin	Eliminated 6th on April 3, 2020
Loiza Lamers	Model, Holland's Next Top Model winner & LGBTQ activist	Andrzej Cibis	Eliminated 4th & 7th on April 17, 2020
Martin Klempnow	Actor	Marta Arndt	Eliminated 8th on April 24, 2020
Laura Müller	It-Girl	Christian Polanc; Robert Beitsch (Week 5)	Eliminated 9th on May 1, 2020
Ilka Bessin	Comedian	Erich Klann	Eliminated 10th on May 8, 2020
Tijan Njie	Actor	Kathrin Menzinger	Eliminated 11th on May 15, 2020
Luca Hänni	Singer	Christina Luft	Third place on May 22, 2020
Moritz Hans	Sports climber & Ninja Warrior Germany champion	Renata Lusin	Runner-Up on May 22, 2020
Lili Paul-Roncalli	Circus performer & socialite	Massimo Sinato	Winner on May 22, 2020

== Scoring chart ==
Couple	Place	1	2	1+2	3	4	5	6	5+6	7	8	9	10	11	12	13
Lili & Massimo	1	21	27	48	26	23	28+6=34	30	64	29	30+16=46	29+10=39	30+30=60	27+29=56	24+30+28=82	30+30+30=90
Moritz & Renata	2	15	18	33	26	29	24+8=32	25	57	21	30+17=47	21+8=29	27+30=57	23+29=52	25+30+23=78	30+30+30=90
Luca & Christina	3	21	21	42	22	22	30+8=38	22	60	25	28+17=45	29+6=35	25+30=55	30+30=60	30+27+30=87	27+27+30=84
Tijan & Kathrin	4	23	27	50	22	26	24+8=32	28	60	30	18+15=33	29+2=31	27+30=57	26+30=56	25+28+25=78	
Ilka & Erich	5	15	16	31	17	15	15+6=21	16	37	12	16+15=31	12+1=13	11+16=27	10+11=21		
Laura & Christian	6	17	14	31	20	24	24+6=30	20	50	23	22+16=38	26+4=30	22+24=46			
Martin & Marta	7	13	9	22	19	20	18+8=26	19	45	18	22+16=38	18+3=21				
Loiza & Andrzej	8	15	16	31	19	17	16+6=22	24	46	21	23+15=38					
Ulrike & Valentin	9	11	16	27	12	18	13+6=19	14	33	15						
Sükrü & Alona	10	16	17	33	14	13	11+8=19	17	36							
John & Regina	11	17	21	38	10	17	N/A	N/A								
Aílton & Isabel	12	10	13	23	12	8										
Sabrina & Nikita	13	15	9	24	12											
Steffi & Robert	14	11	11	22												

Red numbers indicates the lowest score for each week.
Green numbers indicates the highest score for each week.
indicates the couple eliminated that week.
indicates the returning couple that finished in the bottom two.
indicates the couple which was immune from elimination.
indicates the couple that didn't perform due to personal reasons.
indicates the couple that withdrew from the competition.
indicates the couple was eliminated but later returned to the competition.
indicates the winning couple.
indicates the runner-up couple.
indicates the third-place couple.

=== Averages ===
This table only counts for dances scored on a traditional 30-points scale.

Rank by average	Place	Couple	Total	Dances	Average
1	1	Lili & Massimo	531	19	27.9
2	3	Luca & Christina	506	19	26.6
3	4	Tijan & Kathrin	418	16	26.1
4	2	Moritz & Renata	486	19	25.6
5	6	Laura & Christian	236	11	21.5
6	8	Loiza & Andrzej	151	8	18.9
7	7	Martin & Marta	156	9	17.3
8	11	John & Regina	65	4	16.3
9	10	Sükrü & Alona	88	6	14.7
10	9	Ulrike & Valentin	99	7	14.1
11	5	Ilka & Erich	182	13	14.0
12	13	Sabrina & Nikita	36	3	12.0
13	14	Steffi & Robert	22	2	11.0
14	12	Aílton & Isabel	43	4	10.8

== Highest and lowest scoring performances ==
The best and worst performances in each dance according to the judges' marks are as follows:

Dance	Best dancer(s)	Best score	Worst dancer(s)	Worst score
Cha-cha-cha	Luca Hänni; Lili Paul-Roncalli	30	Aílton	8
Viennese waltz	Moritz Hans	29	Sabrina Setlur	9
Salsa	Tijan Njie	29	Aílton; Ulrike von der Groeben	13
Tango	Lili Paul-Roncalli	30	Ilka Bessin; Sabrina Setlur	15
Quickstep	Lili Paul-Roncalli; Luca Hänni	29	Aílton	10
Jive	Tijan Njie; Luca Hänni	30	John Kelly	10
Waltz	Lili Paul-Roncalli	30	Aílton	12
Charleston	Luca Hänni; Moritz Hans	30	Ilka Bessin	12
Contemporary	Luca Hänni; Moritz Hans; Tijan Njie; Lili Paul-Roncalli	30	Ilka Bessin	12
Samba	Lili Paul-Roncalli	30	Ilka Bessin	11
Rumba	Moritz Hans	30	Ulrike von der Groeben	12
Paso doble	Moritz Hans	30	Ilka Bessin	15
Foxtrot	Moritz Hans	25	Ilka Bessin	10
Team Dance	Luca Hänni; Moritz Hans	17	Ilka Bessin; Loiza Lamers; Tijan Njie	15
Discofox Marathon	Lili Paul-Roncalli	10	Ilka Bessin	1
Freestyle (Magic Moment)	Lili Paul-Roncalli	30	Ilka Bessin	11
Bollywood	Laura Müller	24	Ilka Bessin	16
Street	Lili Paul-Roncalli; Tijan Njie	30	-	
Flamenco	Luca Hänni; Moritz Hans	30	-	
Freestyle (Finale)	Luca Hänni; Moritz Hans; Lili Paul-Roncalli	30	-	

== Couples' highest and lowest scoring dances ==
According to the traditional 30-point scale.

Couples	Highest Scoring Dances	Score	Lowest Scoring Dances	Score
Lili & Massimo	Waltz; Samba; Freestyle (Magic Moment); Street; Contemporary; Cha-cha-cha; Tango; Freestyle (Finale)	30	Salsa	21
Moritz & Renata	Contemporary; Flamenco; Paso doble Rumba; Charleston; Freestyle (Finale)	30	Viennese waltz	15
Luca & Christina	Contemporary; Flamenco; Cha-cha-cha (twice); Charleston; Jive; Freestyle (Finale)	30	Cha-cha-cha; Salsa	21
Tijan & Kathrin	Jive; Street; Contemporary	30	Foxtrot	18
Ilka & Erich	Cha-cha-cha	17	Foxtrot	10
Laura & Christian	Tango	26	Cha-cha-cha	14
Martin & Marta	Foxtrot	22	Cha-cha-cha	9
Loiza & Andrzej	Charleston	24	Cha-cha-cha	15
Ulrike & Valentin	Tango	18	Cha-cha-cha	11
Sükrü & Alona	Tango; Viennese waltz	17	Jive	11
John & Regina	Viennese waltz	21	Jive	10
Aílton & Isabel	Salsa	13	Cha-cha-cha	8
Sabrina & Nikita	Tango	15	Viennese waltz	9
Steffi & Robert	Viennese waltz Quickstep	11	Viennese waltz Quickstep	11

== Weekly scores and songs ==
=== Launch show ===
For the fourth time, there was a launch show in which each celebrity meets their partner. This show aired on 21 February 2020. In this first live show the couples danced in groups and each couple was awarded points by the judges and the viewers. At the end of the show the couple with the highest combined points was granted immunity from the first elimination in the following week.

- Opening dance of the professional dancers: "Let Me Entertain You" - Robbie Williams/"Shake Your Body (Down to the Ground)" - The Jackson 5/"Pégate" - Ricky Martin
- Special guest: Dancing Star 2019, Pascal Hens und Ekaterina Leonova: Salsa, "Valió la Pena" - Marc Anthony

Key
Celebrity won immunity from the first elimination

The Team dances

Order	Couple	Dance	Music	Judge's Scores			Total
Order	Couple	Dance	Music	Gonzalez	Mabuse	Llambi	Total
1	Ulrike von der Groeben	Cha-cha-cha	"Evacuate the Dancefloor" - Cascada	4	4	3	11
1	Loiza Lamers	Cha-cha-cha	"Evacuate the Dancefloor" - Cascada	5	5	5	15
1	Luca Hänni	Cha-cha-cha	"Evacuate the Dancefloor" - Cascada	7	7	7	21
2	Steffi Jones	Viennese waltz	"Sign of the Times" - Harry Styles	4	4	3	11
2	Moritz Hans	Viennese waltz	"Sign of the Times" - Harry Styles	6	5	4	15
2	Sükrü Pehlivan	Viennese waltz	"Sign of the Times" - Harry Styles	6	6	4	16
3	Laura Müller	Salsa	"Señorita" - Shawn Mendes & Camila Cabello	6	6	5	17
3	Lili Paul-Roncalli	Salsa	"Señorita" - Shawn Mendes & Camila Cabello	7	7	7	21
3	Tijan Njie	Salsa	"Señorita" - Shawn Mendes & Camila Cabello	7	8	8	23
4	Ilka Bessin	Tango	"Hey Sexy Lady" - Shaggy	5	6	4	15
4	Sabrina Setlur	Tango	"Hey Sexy Lady" - Shaggy	5	5	5	15
5	Aílton	Quickstep	"Save Your Kisses for Me" - Brotherhood of Man	4	4	2	10
5	John Kelly	Quickstep	"Save Your Kisses for Me" - Brotherhood of Man	6	6	5	17
5	Martin Klempnow	Quickstep	"Save Your Kisses for Me" - Brotherhood of Man	5	5	3	13

=== Week 1 ===
- Opening dance of the professional dancers: "In the Air Tonight" - Phil Collins/"Higher Love" - Kygo & Whitney Houston

Running order

Order	Couple	Dance	Music	Judge's Scores			Total	Result
Order	Couple	Dance	Music	Gonzalez	Mabuse	Llambi	Total	Result
1	Luca & Christina	Salsa	"Hot in Herre" - Nelly	7	7	7	21	Safe
2	Sabrina & Nikita	Viennese waltz	"Dangerous Woman" - Ariana Grande	4	4	1	9	Bottom two
3	Moritz & Renata	Cha-cha-cha	"Sucker" - Jonas Brothers	7	6	5	18	Safe
4	Steffi & Robert	Quickstep	"Let's Get Loud" - Jennifer Lopez	5	4	2	11	Eliminated
5	Martin & Marta	Cha-cha-cha	"Küssen Verboten" - Die Prinzen	4	4	1	9	Safe
6	Ulrike & Valentin	Waltz	"Imagine" - John Lennon	6	6	4	16	Safe
7	Lili & Massimo	Tango	"Maintenant" - Rupa & the April Fishes	10	9	8	27	Safe
8	Loiza & Andrzej	Quickstep	"Born This Way" - Lady Gaga	6	6	4	16	Safe
9	Aílton & Isabel	Salsa	"Ai Se Eu Te Pego" - Michel Teló	5	5	3	13	Bottom three
10	Ilka & Erich	Viennese waltz	"Rot sind die Rosen" - Semino Rossi	6	6	4	16	Safe
11	Sükrü & Alona	Tango	"Skyfall" - Adele	7	6	4	17	Safe
12	John & Regina	Viennese waltz	"La Valse D'Amelie" - Yann Tiersen	8	7	6	21	Safe
13	Laura & Christian	Cha-cha-cha	"Hot 2 Touch" - Felix Jaehn	5	5	4	14	Safe
14	Tijan & Kathrin	Tango	"Bad Guy" - Billie Eilish	10	9	8	27	Immune

=== Week 2 ===
- Opening dance of the professional dancers: "Insomnia" - Faithless/"Halo" - Beyoncé

Running order

Order	Couple	Dance	Music	Judge's Scores			Total	Result
Order	Couple	Dance	Music	Gonzalez	Mabuse	Llambi	Total	Result
1	Martin & Marta	Charleston	"A Cool Cat In Town" - Tape Five	7	7	5	19	Safe
2	Sabrina & Nikita	Cha-cha-cha	"On the Floor" - Jennifer Lopez ft. Pitbull	5	5	2	12	Eliminated
3	Luca & Christina	Waltz	"Can't Stop the Feeling!" - Torje Bojsten (Cover)	8	8	6	22	Safe
4	Ulrike & Valentin	Rumba	"No Matter What" - Boyzone	5	5	2	12	Safe
5	Moritz & Renata	Tango	"When Doves Cry" - Prince	9	9	8	26	Safe
6	Sükrü & Alona	Charleston	"Bella ciao"	6	5	3	14	Bottom three
7	Loiza & Andrzej	Contemporary	"Schön genug" - Lina Maly	7	7	5	19	Safe
8	Lili & Massimo	Jive	"Lollipop" - The Chordettes	9	9	8	26	Safe
9	Aílton & Isabel	Waltz	"When I Need You" - Leo Sayer	5	5	2	12	Bottom two
10	Ilka & Erich	Cha-cha-cha	"Respect" - Aretha Franklin	6	6	5	17	Safe
11	Laura & Christian	Viennese waltz	"You Don't Own Me" - Grace	7	7	6	20	Safe
12	John & Regina	Jive	"Can't Take My Eyes Off You" - Frankie Valli	5	4	1	10	Safe
13	Tijan & Kathrin	Cha-cha-cha	"Don't Start Now" - Dua Lipa	8	7	7	22	Safe

=== Week 3 ===
Theme: 70's

- For the first time in the history of the show only family and friends were present in the studio.
- Opening dance of the professional dancers: "I Will Survive"-Gloria Gaynor/"Everybody Dance"-Chic

Running order

Order	Couple	Dance	Music	Judge's Scores			Total	Result
Order	Couple	Dance	Music	Gonzalez	Mabuse	Llambi	Total	Result
1	Loiza & Andrzej	Jive	"Under the Moon of Love"-Showaddywaddy	7	6	4	17	Bottom two
2	Ulrike & Valentin	Tango	"Notre Tango D'Amour"-Vicky Leandros	7	7	4	18	Bottom four
3	Luca & Christina	Samba	"Stayin' Alive"-Bee Gees	8	7	7	22	Safe
4	John & Regina	Contemporary	"Who'll Come With Me (David's Song)"-The Kelly Family	6	6	5	17	Safe
5	Sükrü & Alona	Cha-cha-cha	"Car Wash"-Rose Royce	5	5	3	13	Bottom three
6	Aílton & Isabel	Cha-cha-cha	"Daddy Cool"-Boney M.	3	4	1	8	Eliminated
7	Tijan & Kathrin	Rumba	"Let's Get It On"-Marvin Gaye	9	8	9	26	Safe
8	Laura & Christian	Paso doble	"I Love Rock 'n' Roll"-Arrows	8	8	8	24	Safe
9	Ilka & Erich	Rumba	"If You Leave Me Now"-Chicago	6	6	3	15	Safe
10	Martin & Marta	Paso doble	"Cold as Ice"-Foreigner	7	7	6	20	Safe
11	Moritz & Renata	Charleston	"You're the One That I Want"-John Travolta & Olivia Newton-John	10	10	9	29	Safe
12	Lili & Massimo	Foxtrot	"Close to You"-The Carpenters	8	8	7	23	Safe

=== Week 4 ===
- John didn't perform this week due to an illness in his family.
- For the first time in the history of the show, the dancers performed without a live audience. This continued for the rest of the season.

Running order

Order	Couple	Dance	Music	Judge's Scores			Total	Result
Order	Couple	Dance	Music	Gonzalez	Mabuse	Llambi	Total	Result
1	Tijan & Kathrin	Viennese waltz	"Monsters"-James Blunt	9	9	6	24	Safe
2	Loiza & Andrzej	Rumba	"Naked"-James Arthur	6	6	4	16	Eliminated
3	Laura & Christian	Charleston	"Boyfriend"-Lou Bega	8	8	8	24	Safe
4	Ulrike & Valentin	Salsa	"Bajo la Tormenta"-Sergio George's Salsa Giants	5	5	3	13	Bottom three
5	Luca & Christina	Contemporary	"Someone You Loved"-Lewis Capaldi	10	10	10	30	Safe
6	Sükrü & Alona	Jive	"Marmor, Stein und Eisen bricht"-Drafi Deutscher	5	5	1	11	Bottom two
7	Martin & Marta	Tango	"Tango the Night"-Falco	7	7	4	18	Safe
8	Ilka & Erich	Paso doble	"(I Can't Get No) Satisfaction"-The Rolling Stones	6	6	3	15	Safe
9	Lili & Massimo	Cha-cha-cha	"Promises"-Calvin Harris & Sam Smith	10	9	9	28	Safe
10	Moritz & Renata	Rumba	"Love Someone"-Lukas Graham	9	8	7	24	Safe
—N/a	John & Regina	Cha-cha-cha	"Give It Up"-KC and the Sunshine Band	Given by				
Boys vs Girls Battle
1	Team Girls	Freestyle	"Swan Lake"-Pyotr Ilyich Tchaikovsky	6				The Boys won the Boys vs Girls Battle
2	Team Boys	Freestyle	"Smooth Criminal"-Michael Jackson	8				The Boys won the Boys vs Girls Battle

=== Week 5 ===
Theme: 90's

- John Kelly had to withdraw from the show due to an illness in his family. Loiza Lamers returned after being eliminated.
- Christian Polanc didn't dance this week because he was ill. Laura Müller danced with Robert Beitsch instead.

Running order

Order	Couple	Dance	Music	Judge's Scores			Total	Result
Order	Couple	Dance	Music	Gonzalez	Mabuse	Llambi	Total	Result
1	Luca & Christina	Foxtrot	"Tearin' Up My Heart"-NSYNC	8	8	6	22	Safe
2	Sükrü & Alona	Viennese waltz	"When a Man Loves a Woman"-Michael Bolton	7	7	3	17	Eliminated
3	Loiza & Andrzej	Charleston	"Cotton Eye Joe"-Rednex	9	8	7	24	Safe
4	Ulrike & Valentin	Cha-cha-cha	"Believe"-Cher	6	6	2	14	Bottom three
5	Moritz & Renata	Quickstep	"Flying"-Nice Little Penguins	9	9	7	25	Safe
6	Ilka & Erich	Salsa	"La Vida Es Un Carnaval"-Celia Cruz	7	6	3	16	Safe
7	Lili & Massimo	Waltz	"Je Suis Malade"-Lara Fabian	10	10	10	30	Safe
8	Laura & Robert	Contemporary	"Hijo de la Luna"-Loona	8	7	5	20	Safe
9	Martin & Marta	Rumba	"Babe"-Take That	7	7	5	19	Bottom two
10	Tijan & Kathrin	Samba	"I Just Can't Wait to Be King"-Jason Weaver	10	9	9	28	Safe

=== Week 6 ===
Theme: Love Week

Running order

Order	Couple	Dance	Music	Judge's Scores			Total	Result
Order	Couple	Dance	Music	Gonzalez	Mabuse	Llambi	Total	Result
1	Laura & Christian	Jive	"Dein Ist Mein Ganzes Herz"-Heinz Rudolf Kunze	8	8	7	23	Bottom two
2	Ulrike & Valentin	Foxtrot	"Ich liebe das Leben"-Vicky Leandros	6	6	3	15	Eliminated
3	Luca & Christina	Paso doble	"I Was Made for Lovin' You"-Kiss	9	9	7	25	Safe
4	Tijan & Kathrin	Jive	"Crazy Little Thing Called Love"-Queen	10	10	10	30	Safe
5	Ilka & Erich	Contemporary	"Go Your Own Way"-Fleetwood Mac	5	5	2	12	Safe
6	Loiza & Andrzej	Tango	"Bang Bang (My Baby Shot Me Down)"-Nancy Sinatra	8	8	5	21	Safe
7	Lili & Massimo	Quickstep	"Liebeskummer lohnt sich nicht"-Siw Malmqwist	10	10	9	29	Safe
8	Martin & Marta	Salsa	"Eres Mi Sueno"-Carlo Supo	7	7	4	18	Bottom three
9	Moritz & Renata	Jive	"Dance with Me Tonight"-Olly Murs	8	7	6	21	Safe

=== Week 7 ===
- The show aired on April 17 because of the Easter holidays.
- Musical guests: Ramon Roselly - "Eine Nacht"

Running order

Order	Couple	Dance	Music	Judge's Scores			Total	Result
Order	Couple	Dance	Music	Gonzalez	Mabuse	Llambi	Total	Result
1	Tijan & Kathrin	Foxtrot	"Fly Me to the Moon"-Frank Sinatra	7	7	4	18	Safe
2	Laura & Christian	Rumba	"Make You Feel My Love"-Adele	8	7	7	22	Bottom three
3	Loiza & Andrzej	Paso doble	"Rhythm Is a Dancer"-Snap!	9	8	6	23	Eliminated
4	Luca & Christina	Rumba	"Avant Toi"-Vitaa & Slimane	10	10	8	28	Safe
5	Ilka & Erich	Tango	"Palladio Allegretto"-Jenkins	7	6	3	16	Bottom two
6	Lili & Massimo	Samba	"Pon de Replay"-Rihanna	10	10	10	30	Safe
7	Martin & Marta	Foxtrot	"My Girl"-The Temptations	8	8	6	22	Safe
8	Moritz & Renata	Contemporary	"Apologize"-Timbaland & OneRepublic	10	10	10	30	Safe
Teams Battle
1	Team Llambi; Lili & Massimo; Laura & Christian; Martin & Marta	Freestyle	"Un Amor"-Gipsy Kings/"A Mi Manera"/"My Way"	8	8	X	16	Team Mabuse won the Teams Battle
2	Team Gonzalez; Ilka & Erich; Loiza & Andrzej; Tijan & Kathrin	Freestyle	"Vogue"-Madonna/"Push the Feeling On"-Nightcrawlers	X	8	7	15	Team Mabuse won the Teams Battle
3	Team Mabuse; Luca & Christina; Moritz & Renata	Freestyle	"Epilogue"-Justin Hurwitz	9	X	8	17	Team Mabuse won the Teams Battle

=== Week 8 ===
Thema: TV-Melodien

Running order

Order	Couple	Dance	Music	Film/Series	Judge's Scores			Total	Result
Order	Couple	Dance	Music	Film/Series	Gonzalez	Mabuse	Llambi	Total	Result
1	Luca & Christina	Quickstep	"I'll Be There for You"-The Rembrandts	Friends	10	10	9	29	Safe
2	Laura & Christian	Tango	"Santa Maria"-Gotan Project	Darf ich bitten?	9	8	9	26	Bottom two
3	Ilka & Erich	Charleston	"Probier's mal mit Gemütlichkeit"-Balu & Mogli	Das Dschungelbuch	5	5	2	12	Safe
4	Moritz & Renata	Samba	"(Nel blu dipinto di blu) Volare"-Domenico Modugno	Ein Fisch namens Wanda	8	8	5	21	Bottom three
5	Tijan & Kathrin	Salsa	"El Sueno De Mi Vida"-Mercadonegro	The Latin Dream	9	10	10	29	Safe
6	Martin & Marta	Jive	"Mein Name ist Hase"-Chor & Orchester FKM	The Bugs Bunny Show	7	7	4	18	Eliminated
7	Lili & Massimo	Paso doble	"Canción del Mariachi"-Los Lobos & Antonio Banderas	Desperado	10	9	10	29	Safe
Discofox Marathon
	Ilka & Erich	Discofox Marathon	"Sieben Leben für dich"-Maite Kelly "Eiskalt"-Matthias Reim "Eine Nacht"-Ramon Roselly "Eine Woche wach"-Mickie Krause "Geh mal Bier hol’n"-Mickie Krause "Egal"-Michael Wendler "Rudi, das Rüsselschwein"-Dicht und Doof		1				Lili & Massimo won the Discofox Marathon
	Tijan & Kathrin	Discofox Marathon	"Sieben Leben für dich"-Maite Kelly "Eiskalt"-Matthias Reim "Eine Nacht"-Ramon Roselly "Eine Woche wach"-Mickie Krause "Geh mal Bier hol’n"-Mickie Krause "Egal"-Michael Wendler "Rudi, das Rüsselschwein"-Dicht und Doof		2				Lili & Massimo won the Discofox Marathon
	Martin & Marta	Discofox Marathon	"Sieben Leben für dich"-Maite Kelly "Eiskalt"-Matthias Reim "Eine Nacht"-Ramon Roselly "Eine Woche wach"-Mickie Krause "Geh mal Bier hol’n"-Mickie Krause "Egal"-Michael Wendler "Rudi, das Rüsselschwein"-Dicht und Doof		3				Lili & Massimo won the Discofox Marathon
	Laura & Christian	Discofox Marathon	"Sieben Leben für dich"-Maite Kelly "Eiskalt"-Matthias Reim "Eine Nacht"-Ramon Roselly "Eine Woche wach"-Mickie Krause "Geh mal Bier hol’n"-Mickie Krause "Egal"-Michael Wendler "Rudi, das Rüsselschwein"-Dicht und Doof		4				Lili & Massimo won the Discofox Marathon
	Luca & Christina	Discofox Marathon	"Sieben Leben für dich"-Maite Kelly "Eiskalt"-Matthias Reim "Eine Nacht"-Ramon Roselly "Eine Woche wach"-Mickie Krause "Geh mal Bier hol’n"-Mickie Krause "Egal"-Michael Wendler "Rudi, das Rüsselschwein"-Dicht und Doof		6				Lili & Massimo won the Discofox Marathon
	Moritz & Renata	Discofox Marathon	"Sieben Leben für dich"-Maite Kelly "Eiskalt"-Matthias Reim "Eine Nacht"-Ramon Roselly "Eine Woche wach"-Mickie Krause "Geh mal Bier hol’n"-Mickie Krause "Egal"-Michael Wendler "Rudi, das Rüsselschwein"-Dicht und Doof		8				Lili & Massimo won the Discofox Marathon
	Lili & Massimo	Discofox Marathon	"Sieben Leben für dich"-Maite Kelly "Eiskalt"-Matthias Reim "Eine Nacht"-Ramon Roselly "Eine Woche wach"-Mickie Krause "Geh mal Bier hol’n"-Mickie Krause "Egal"-Michael Wendler "Rudi, das Rüsselschwein"-Dicht und Doof		10				Lili & Massimo won the Discofox Marathon

=== Week 9 ===
Thema: Magic Moments

Running order

Order	Couple	Dance	Music	Judge's Scores			Total	Result
Order	Couple	Dance	Music	Gonzalez	Mabuse	Llambi	Total	Result
1	Laura & Christian	Freestyle	"Never Tear Us Apart"-Bishop Briggs	8	8	6	22	Eliminated
2	Luca & Christina	Freestyle	"This Is Me"-Keala Settle	9	9	7	25	Bottom three
3	Moritz & Renata	Freestyle	"Eye of the Tiger"-Survivor	9	9	9	27	Safe
4	Ilka & Erich	Freestyle	"Work It"-Missy Elliott/"Wie schön du bist"-Sarah Connor	5	5	1	11	Bottom two
5	Tijan & Kathrin	Freestyle	"The Book of Love"-Peter Gabriel	10	10	7	27	Safe
6	Lili & Massimo	Freestyle	"Clubbed to Death"-Rob Dougan	10	10	10	30	Safe
Dance Duels
1	Luca & Christina	Flamenco	"Djobi Djoba"-Gipsy Kings	10	10	10	30	Both couples won the Dance Duel
1	Moritz & Renata	Flamenco	"Djobi Djoba"-Gipsy Kings	10	10	10	30	Both couples won the Dance Duel
2	Ilka & Erich	Bollywood	"Pinga"-Shreya Goshal & Vaishali Mhade	6	7	3	16	Laura & Christian won the Dance Duel
2	Laura & Christian	Bollywood	"Pinga"-Shreya Goshal & Vaishali Mhade	8	9	7	24	Laura & Christian won the Dance Duel
3	Lili & Massimo	Street	"It's Tricky"-Run-DMC	10	10	10	30	Both couples won the Dance Duel
3	Tijan & Kathrin	Street	"It's Tricky"-Run-DMC	10	10	10	30	Both couples won the Dance Duel

=== Week 10 ===
- Due to the COVID-19 pandemic in Germany there was no trio challenge. This year each couple was instead assigned a prop for the second dance.

Thema: Challenge dances

Running order

Order	Couple	Dance	Music	Judge's Scores			Total	Result
Order	Couple	Dance	Music	Gonzalez	Mabuse	Llambi	Total	Result
1	Luca & Christina	Cha-cha-cha	"Ay Mujer"-Rey Ruiz	10	10	10	30	Safe
2	Ilka & Erich	Foxtrot	"Dream a Little Dream of Me"-Doris Day	5	4	1	10	Eliminated
3	Moritz & Renata	Salsa	"Conga"-Gloria Estefan	8	8	7	23	Bottom two
4	Tijan & Kathrin	Charleston	"Hit the Road Jack"-Ray Charles	9	9	8	26	Safe
5	Lili & Massimo	Charleston	"Sing, Sing, Sing (With a Swing)"-Benny Goodman	9	9	9	27	Safe
Challenge dance
1	Ilka & Erich	Samba	"I Love to Love (But My Baby Loves to Dance)"-Tina Charles	5	5	1	11	
2	Moritz & Renata	Viennese waltz	"I'd Rather Go Blind"-Etta James	10	10	9	29	
3	Luca & Christina	Charleston	"Mambo No. 5"-Lou Bega	10	10	10	30	
4	Lili & Massimo	Rumba	"Bésame Mucho"-Cesaria Evora	10	10	9	29	
5	Tijan & Kathrin	Contemporary	"Let It Go"-James Bay	10	10	10	30	

=== Week 11: Semi-final ===
- Thema: Impro Dance Even More Extreme

Running order

Order	Couple	Dance	Music	Judge's Scores			Total	Result
Order	Couple	Dance	Music	Gonzalez	Mabuse	Llambi	Total	Result
1	Tijan & Kathrin	Quickstep	"Ring of Fire"-Johnny Cash	9	9	7	25	Eliminated
1	Tijan & Kathrin	Paso doble	"Hora Zero"-Rodrigo y Gabriela	10	10	8	28	Eliminated
2	Lili & Massimo	Salsa	"Yo No Sé Mañana"-Luis Enrique	8	8	8	24	Safe
2	Lili & Massimo	Contemporary	"One Day I'll Fly Away"-Vaults	10	10	10	30	Safe
3	Moritz & Renata	Foxtrot	"Sowieso"-Mark Forster	9	9	7	25	Bottom two
3	Moritz & Renata	Paso doble	"Black Is Black"-Los Bravos	10	10	10	30	Bottom two
4	Luca & Christina	Jive	"I Got Lucky"-Elvis Presley	10	10	10	30	Safe
4	Luca & Christina	Tango	"The Phantom of the Opera"-Andrew Lloyd Webber	10	10	7	27	Safe
Impro Dance Even More Extreme
1	Tijan & Kathrin	Viennese waltz	"Stop!"-Sam Brown	9	9	7	25	
2	Lili & Massimo	Charleston	"Puttin' On the Ritz"-Irving Berlin	10	10	8	28	
3	Moritz & Renata	Rumba	"Stay with Me"-Sam Smith	8	9	6	23	
4	Luca & Christina	Cha-cha-cha	"Blurred Lines"-Robin Thicke ft. T.I. & Pharrell Williams	10	10	10	30	

=== Week 12: Final ===
- Theme: Judges' choice, favorite dance & Freestyle
- Musical guests: Pietro Lombardi - "Kämpferherz"

Running order

Order	Couple	Dance	Music	Judge's Scores			Total	Result
Order	Couple	Dance	Music	Gonzalez	Mabuse	Llambi	Total	Result
1	Lili & Massimo	Cha-cha-cha	"Guantanamera"-Compay Segundo	10	10	10	30	Winner
1	Lili & Massimo	Tango	"Maintenant"-Rupa & the April Fishes	10	10	10	30	Winner
1	Lili & Massimo	Freestyle	Medley of Aladdin	10	10	10	30	Winner
2	Luca & Christina	Salsa	"Y Le Dije No"-Yahaira Plasencia ft. Sergio George	9	9	9	27	Third place
2	Luca & Christina	Quickstep	"I'll Be There for You"-The Rembrandts	9	9	9	27	Third place
2	Luca & Christina	Freestyle	Medley of Sing	10	10	10	30	Third place
3	Moritz & Renata	Rumba	"The Most Beautiful Girl In The World"-Prince	10	10	10	30	Runner-Up
3	Moritz & Renata	Charleston	"You're the One That I Want"-John Travolta & Olivia Newton-John	10	10	10	30	Runner-Up
3	Moritz & Renata	Freestyle	Medley of Beauty and the Beast	10	10	10	30	Runner-Up

== Dance chart ==
Highest scoring dance
Lowest scoring dance
Was not scored (encore performance in the finale)
The pair did not perform this week

Couple	Launch	Week 1	Week 2	Week 3	Week 4		Week 5	Week 6	Week 7		Week 8		Week 9		Week 10		Week 11			Week 12		
Lili & Massimo	Salsa	Tango	Jive	Foxtrot	Cha-cha-cha	Freestyle	Waltz	Quickstep	Samba	Team Llambi	Paso doble	Discofox	Freestyle	Street	Charleston	Rumba	Salsa	Contemporary	Charleston	Cha-cha-cha	Tango	Freestyle
Moritz & Renata	Viennese waltz	Cha-cha-cha	Tango	Charleston	Rumba	Freestyle	Quickstep	Jive	Contemporary	Team Mabuse	Samba	Discofox	Freestyle	Flamenco	Salsa	Viennese waltz	Foxtrot	Paso doble	Rumba	Rumba	Charleston	Freestyle
Luca & Christina	Cha-cha-cha	Salsa	Waltz	Samba	Contemporary	Freestyle	Foxtrot	Paso doble	Rumba	Team Mabuse	Quickstep	Discofox	Freestyle	Flamenco	Cha-cha-cha	Charleston	Jive	Tango	Cha-cha-cha	Salsa	Quickstep	Freestyle
Tijan & Kathrin	Salsa	Tango	Cha-cha-cha	Rumba	Viennese waltz	Freestyle	Samba	Jive	Foxtrot	Team Gonzalez	Salsa	Discofox	Freestyle	Street	Charleston	Contemporary	Quickstep	Paso doble	Viennese waltz			Tango
Ilka & Erich	Tango	Viennese waltz	Cha-cha-cha	Rumba	Paso doble	Freestyle	Salsa	Contemporary	Tango	Team Gonzalez	Charleston	Discofox	Freestyle	Bollywood	Foxtrot	Samba						
Laura & Christian	Salsa	Cha-cha-cha	Viennese waltz	Paso doble	Charleston	Freestyle	Contemporary	Jive	Rumba	Team Llambi	Tango	Discofox	Freestyle	Bollywood								Tango
Martin & Marta	Quickstep	Cha-cha-cha	Charleston	Paso doble	Tango	Freestyle	Rumba	Salsa	Foxtrot	Team Llambi	Jive	Discofox										Foxtrot
Loiza & Andrzej	Cha-cha-cha	Quickstep	Contemporary	Jive	Rumba	Freestyle	Charleston	Tango	Paso doble	Team Gonzalez												Tango
Ulrike & Valentin	Cha-cha-cha	Waltz	Rumba	Tango	Salsa	Freestyle	Cha-cha-cha	Foxtrot														Salsa
Sükrü & Alona	Viennese waltz	Tango	Charleston	Cha-cha-cha	Jive	Freestyle	Viennese waltz															Tango
John & Regina	Quickstep	Viennese waltz	Jive	Contemporary	Cha-cha-cha	Freestyle																
Aílton & Isabel	Quickstep	Salsa	Waltz	Cha-cha-cha																		Salsa
Sabrina & Nikita	Tango	Viennese waltz	Cha-cha-cha																			Cha-cha-cha
Steffi & Robert	Viennese waltz	Quickstep																				Quickstep
