= Let's Dance (German TV series) season 12 =

Season of a television series

Let's Dance
- Season 12
- Celebrity winner: Pascal Hens
- Professional winner: Ekaterina Leonova

Release
- Original network: RTL Television
- Original release: March 15, 2019 (launch); March 22, 2019 – 14 June 2019

Season chronology
- ← Previous; Season 11 Next → Season 13

The twelfth season of Let's Dance started on March 15, 2019 and ended on June 14, 2019. Daniel Hartwich and Victoria Swarovski returned as hosts. Joachim Llambi, Motsi Mabuse, and Jorge González also returned as the judges.

Dancing Stars 2019 were Pascal Hens & Ekaterina Leonova.

== Couples ==
Celebrity	Notability (known for)	Professional partner	Status
Jan Hartmann	Actor	Renata Lusin	Eliminated 1st on March 22, 2019
Özcan Cosar	Comedian	Marta Arndt	Eliminated 2nd on March 29, 2019
Lukas Rieger	Singer	Katja Kalugina	Eliminated 3rd on April 5, 2019
Thomas Rath	Author	Kathrin Menzinger	Eliminated 4th on April 12, 2019
Kerstin Ott	Singer	Regina Luca	Eliminated 5th on April 26, 2019
Ulrike Frank	Actress	Robert Beitsch	Eliminated 6th on May 3, 2019
Sabrina Mockenhaupt	Long-distance runner	Erich Klann	Eliminated 7th on May 10, 2019
Oliver Pocher	Comedian	Christina Luft	Eliminated 8th on May 17, 2019
Barbara Becker	Designer	Massimo Sinato	Eliminated 9th on May 24, 2019
Evelyn Burdecki	It-Girl	Evgeny Vinokurov	Eliminated 10th on May 31, 2019
Nazan Eckes	Television Presenter	Christian Polanc	Eliminated 11th on June 7, 2019
Benjamin Piwko	Actor	Isabel Edvardsson	Third place on June 14, 2019
Ella Endlich	Singer	Valentin Lusin	Runner-Up on June 14, 2019
Pascal Hens	Handball player	Ekaterina Leonova	Winner on June 14, 2019

== Scoring chart ==
Couple	Place	1	2	3	4	5	6	7	8	9	10	11	12	13
Pascal & Ekaterina	1	17	24	23	24	25+8=33	30	30	29+20=49	28+3=31	28+25=53	29+25=54	25+21+26=72	30+30+30=90
Ella & Valentin	2	17	25	29	28	27+5=32	30	30	30+20=50	29+8=37	29+28=57	30+30=60	30+30+30=90	30+30+30=90
Benjamin & Isabel	3	19	23	16	21	26+8=34	27	12	16+18=34	20+2=22	30+30=60	27+18=45	22+26+26=74	23+28+30=81
Nazan & Christian	4	14	16	18	20	19+5=24	22	27	20+18=38	30+4=34	29+28=57	23+29=52	23+29+26=78	
Evelyn & Evgeny	5	14	10	13	15	10+5=15	26	19	19+16=35	18+1=19	22+24=46	20+19=39		
Barbara & Massimo	6	16	19	20	18	29+5=34	24	22	17+18=35	24+10=34	23+23=46			
Oliver & Christina	7	11	13	15	20	17+8=25	20	13	18+16=34	21+6=27				
Sabrina & Erich	8	11	10	11	13	16+5=21	19	12	12+16=28					
Ulrike & Robert	9	17	14	19	21	28+5=33	25	23						
Kerstin & Regina	10	8	12	10	10	7+8=15	7							
Thomas & Kathrin	11	20	21	23	23	23+8=31								
Lukas & Katja	12	15	19	20	16									
Özcan & Marta	13	15	19	14										
Jan & Renata	14	13	16											

Red numbers indicates the lowest score for each week.
Green numbers indicates the highest score for each week.
indicates the couple eliminated that week.
indicates the returning couple that finished in the bottom two.
indicates the couple which was immune from elimination.
indicates the winning couple.
indicates the runner-up couple.
indicates the third-place couple.

=== Averages ===
This table only counts for dances scored on a traditional 30-points scale.

Rank by average	Place	Couple	Total	Dances	Average
1	2	Ella & Valentin	542	19	28.5
2	1	Pascal & Ekaterina	499	19	26.3
3	4	Nazan & Christian	373	16	23.3
4	3	Benjamin & Isabel	440	19	23.2
5	11	Thomas & Kathrin	110	5	22.0
6	6	Barbara & Massimo	235	11	21.4
7	9	Ulrike & Robert	147	7	21.0
8	5	Evelyn & Evgeny	229	13	17.6
9	12	Lukas & Katja	70	4	17.5
10	7	Oliver & Christina	148	9	16.4
11	13	Özcan & Marta	48	3	16.0
12	14	Jan & Renata	29	2	14.5
13	8	Sabrina & Erich	104	8	13.0
14	10	Kerstin & Regina	54	6	9.0

== Highest and lowest scoring performances ==
The best and worst performances in each dance according to the judges' marks are as follows:

Dance	Best dancer(s)	Best score	Worst dancer(s)	Worst score
Cha-cha-cha	Ella Endlich	30	Evelyn Burdecki; Sabrina Mockenhaupt; Kerstin Ott	10
Quickstep	Ella Endlich; Pascal Hens	30	Ulrike Frank	14
Waltz	Ulrike Frank	28	Kerstin Ott	8
Viennese waltz	Ella Endlich	27	Jan Hartmann	16
Salsa	Ella Endlich; Pascal Hens	30	Kerstin Ott	7
Rumba	Ella Endlich	30	Barbara Becker; Evelyn Burdecki	18
Foxtrot	Ella Endlich	30	Evelyn Burdecki	13
Tango	Ella Endlich; Pascal Hens	30	Kerstin Ott	10
Contemporary	Pascal Hens; Nazan Eckes	30	Evelyn Burdecki	15
Jive	Ella Endlich	29	Evelyn Burdecki	10
Charleston	Ella Endlich	30	Kerstin Ott	7
Paso doble	Ella Endlich	30	Sabrina Mockenhaupt	12
Samba	Ella Endlich	30	Barbara Becker	17
Team Dance	Ella Endlich; Pascal Hens	20	Evelyn Burdecki; Oliver Pocher; Sabrina Mockenhaupt	16
Discofox Marathon	Barbara Becker	10	Evelyn Burdecki	1
Freestyle (Magic Moment)	Benjamin Piwko	30	Evelyn Burdecki	22
Bollywood	Nazan Eckes; Ella Endlich	28	-	
Street	Evelyn Burdecki	24	Barbara Becker	23
Flamenco	Benjamin Piwko	30	Pascal Hens	25
Freestyle (Finale)	Benjamin Piwko; Ella Endlich; Pascal Hens	30	-	

== Couples' highest and lowest scoring dances ==
According to the traditional 30-point scale.

Couples	Highest Scoring Dances	Score	Lowest Scoring Dances	Score
Pascal & Ekaterina	Quickstep; Contemporary; Tango; Salsa; Freestyle (Finale)	30	Viennese waltz	17
Ella & Valentin	Samba (2x); Tango; Foxtrot; Charleston; Rumba; Cha-cha-cha; Paso doble Impro Salsa; Quickstep; Freestyle (Finale)	30	Quickstep	17
Benjamin & Isabel	Freestyle; Flamenco; Freestyle (Finale)	30	Jive	12
Nazan & Christian	Contemporary	30	Cha-cha-cha	14
Evelyn & Evgeny	Tango	26	Cha-cha-cha; Jive	10
Barbara & Massimo	Tango	29	Quickstep	16
Oliver & Christina	Rumba	21	Salsa	11
Sabrina & Erich	Waltz	19	Cha-cha-cha	10
Ulrike & Robert	Waltz	28	Quickstep	14
Kerstin & Regina	Waltz	12	Charleston; Salsa	7
Thomas & Kathrin	Cha-cha-cha; Jive; Tango	23	Viennese waltz	20
Lukas & Katja	Contemporary	20	Salsa	15
Özcan & Marta	Salsa	19	Jive	14
Jan & Renata	Viennese waltz	16	Waltz	13

== Weekly scores and songs ==
=== Launch show ===
For the third time there was a launch show in which each celebrity meets his partner. This show aired on 15 March 2019. In this first live show the couples then danced in groups and each couple got points by the judges and the viewers. At the end of the show the couple with the highest combined points was granted immunity from the first elimination.

Key
Celebrity won immunity from the first elimination

The Team dances

Order	Couple	Dance	Music	Judge's Scores			Total
Order	Couple	Dance	Music	Gonzalez	Mabuse	Llambi	Total
1	Evelyn Burdecki	Cha-cha-cha	"Can't Get You Out of My Head" - Kylie Minogue	5	5	4	14
1	Nazan Eckes	Cha-cha-cha	"Can't Get You Out of My Head" - Kylie Minogue	5	5	4	14
1	Sabrina Mockenhaupt	Cha-cha-cha	"Can't Get You Out of My Head" - Kylie Minogue	4	4	3	11
2	Ulrike Frank	Quickstep	"Gekommen um zu bleiben" - Wir sind Helden	6	6	5	17
2	Barbara Becker	Quickstep	"Gekommen um zu bleiben" - Wir sind Helden	6	6	4	16
2	Ella Endlich	Quickstep	"Gekommen um zu bleiben" - Wir sind Helden	6	6	5	17
3	Kerstin Ott	Waltz	“River Flows In You“ - Yiruma	3	3	2	8
3	Jan Hartmann	Waltz	“River Flows In You“ - Yiruma	4	5	4	13
4	Benjamin Piwko	Viennese waltz	"It's a Man's Man's Man's World" - James Brown	7	7	5	19
4	Thomas Rath	Viennese waltz	"It's a Man's Man's Man's World" - James Brown	7	7	6	20
4	Pascal Hens	Viennese waltz	"It's a Man's Man's Man's World" - James Brown	7	7	3	17
5	Lukas Rieger	Salsa	"Vem Dançar Kuduro" - Lucenzo ft. Big Ali	4	5	6	15
5	Oliver Pocher	Salsa	"Vem Dançar Kuduro" - Lucenzo ft. Big Ali	3	4	4	11
5	Özcan Cosar	Salsa	"Vem Dançar Kuduro" - Lucenzo ft. Big Ali	4	5	6	15

=== Week 1 ===
Running order

Order	Couple	Dance	Music	Judge's Scores			Total	Result
Order	Couple	Dance	Music	Gonzalez	Mabuse	Llambi	Total	Result
1	Ulrike & Robert	Quickstep	"Good Morning" - Judy Garland & Mickey Rooney	6	5	3	14	Safe
2	Thomas & Kathrin	Viennese waltz	"Merci, Chérie" - Udo Jürgens	8	7	6	21	Safe
3	Özcan & Marta	Salsa	"Baila Me" - Gipsy Kings	6	6	7	19	Safe
4	Evelyn & Evgeny	Cha-cha-cha	"WTF" - Hugel ft. Amber Van Day	4	4	2	10	Safe
5	Lukas & Katja	Salsa	"Fireball" - Pitbull ft. John Ryan	6	7	6	19	Safe
6	Ella & Valentin	Quickstep	"Black Horse and the Cherry Tree" - KT Tunstall	9	8	8	25	Safe
7	Sabrina & Erich	Cha-cha-cha	"I Wanna Dance with Somebody" - Whitney Houston	4	4	2	10	Bottom two
8	Kerstin & Regina	Waltz	"True Colors" - Cyndi Lauper	5	4	3	12	Safe
9	Oliver & Christina	Salsa	"Phänomenal" - Pietro Lombardi	5	4	4	13	Bottom three
10	Barbara & Massimo	Quickstep	"Freedom" - Pharrell Williams	8	6	5	19	Safe
11	Jan & Renata	Viennese waltz	"Breathe Easy" - Blue	6	5	5	16	Eliminated
12	Nazan & Christian	Cha-cha-cha	"How Deep Is Your Love" - Calvin Harris & Disciples	6	6	4	16	Safe
13	Pascal & Ekaterina	Viennese waltz	"Iris" - Goo Goo Dolls	9	8	7	24	Safe
14	Benjamin & Isabel	Waltz	"Moon River" - Andy Williams	8	8	7	23	Immune

=== Week 2 ===
Thema: 80's

Running order

Order	Couple	Dance	Music	Judge's Scores			Total	Result
Order	Couple	Dance	Music	Gonzalez	Mabuse	Llambi	Total	Result
1	Özcan & Marta	Jive	"Footloose" - Kenny Loggins	5	5	4	14	Eliminated
2	Thomas & Kathrin	Cha-cha-cha	"Super Trouper" - ABBA	8	8	7	23	Safe
3	Pascal & Ekaterina	Tango	"Gold" - Spandau Ballet	9	8	6	23	Safe
4	Sabrina & Erich	Tango	"Super Freak" - Rick James	5	4	2	11	Safe
5	Barbara & Massimo	Cha-cha-cha	"Ain't Nobody" - Rufus & Chaka Khan	7	8	5	20	Safe
6	Kerstin & Regina	Cha-cha-cha	"I Am What I Am" - Gloria Gaynor	4	4	2	10	Safe
7	Evelyn & Evgeny	Foxtrot	"Material Girl" - Madonna	5	4	4	13	Bottom two
8	Nazan & Christian	Viennese waltz	"I Guess That's Why They Call It the Blues" - Elton John	7	7	4	18	Safe
9	Lukas & Katja	Contemporary	"Halt mich" - Herbert Grönemeyer	7	7	6	20	Safe
10	Oliver & Christina	Tango	"Ghostbusters" - Ray Parker Jr.	6	5	4	15	Safe
11	Benjamin & Isabel	Cha-cha-cha	"Can You Feel It" - the Jacksons	6	6	4	16	Safe
12	Ulrike & Robert	Rumba	"Woman in Love" - Barbra Streisand	7	7	5	19	Bottom three
13	Ella & Valentin	Contemporary	"Running Up That Hill" - Kate Bush	10	10	9	29	Safe

=== Week 3 ===
Running order

Order	Couple	Dance	Music	Judge's Scores			Total	Result
Order	Couple	Dance	Music	Gonzalez	Mabuse	Llambi	Total	Result
1	Thomas & Kathrin	Jive	"Tell Her About It" - Billy Joel	8	7	8	23	Safe
2	Lukas & Katja	Quickstep	"Pocahontas" - AnnenMayKantereit	6	6	4	16	Eliminated
3	Pascal & Ekaterina	Cha-cha-cha	"Zusammen" - Die Fantastischen Vier ft. Clueso	8	9	7	24	Safe
4	Sabrina & Erich	Salsa	"Cuba" - Gibson Brothers	5	5	3	13	Safe
5	Nazan & Christian	Quickstep	"Lucky Day" - Sasha	8	8	4	20	Safe
6	Evelyn & Evgeny	Contemporary	"Fallin'" - Alicia Keys	6	5	4	15	Bottom three
7	Ulrike & Robert	Tango	"Hernando's Hideaway" - The Johnston Brothers	8	8	5	21	Safe
8	Kerstin & Regina	Tango	"Addicted to You" - Avicii	4	4	2	10	Safe
9	Oliver & Christina	Charleston	"Bills" - LunchMoney Lewis	7	7	6	20	Safe
10	Ella & Valentin	Salsa	"Tu Sonrisa" - Elvis Crespo	9	9	10	28	Safe
11	Barbara & Massimo	Rumba	"Killing Me Softly with His Song" - Roberta Flack	7	6	5	18	Bottom two
12	Benjamin & Isabel	Quickstep	"Puttin' On the Ritz" - Fred Astaire	7	8	6	21	Safe

=== Week 4 ===
Thema: 90's

Running order

Order	Couple	Dance	Music	Judge's Scores			Total	Result
Order	Couple	Dance	Music	Gonzalez	Mabuse	Llambi	Total	Result
1	Thomas & Kathrin	Tango	"Crucified" - Army of Lovers	8	8	7	23	Eliminated
2	Kerstin & Regina	Charleston	"The Scatman" - Scatman John	3	3	1	7	Safe
3	Nazan & Christian	Rumba	"All by Myself" - Celine Dion	7	7	5	19	Safe
4	Sabrina & Erich	Contemporary	"Torn" - Natalie Imbruglia	6	6	4	16	Bottom three
5	Barbara & Massimo	Tango	"Losing My Religion" - R.E.M.	10	10	9	29	Safe
6	Evelyn & Evgeny	Jive	"Herz an Herz" - Jasmin Wagner	4	4	2	10	Bottom two
7	Pascal & Ekaterina	Rumba	"Jessie" - Joshua Kadison	9	9	7	25	Safe
8	Ulrike & Robert	Waltz	"Tears in Heaven" - Eric Clapton	10	9	9	28	Safe
9	Oliver & Christina	Contemporary	"Wind of Change" - Scorpions	6	6	5	17	Safe
10	Ella & Valentin	Viennese waltz	"Dieses Kribbeln im Bauch" - Pe Werner	9	9	9	27	Safe
11	Benjamin & Isabel	Paso doble	"Enjoy the Silence" - Depeche Mode	9	9	8	26	Safe
Boys vs Girls Battle
1	Team Girls	Freestyle	"Pony" - Ginuwine	5				The Boys won the Boys vs Girls Battle
2	Team Boys	Freestyle	"...Baby One More Time" - Britney Spears	8				The Boys won the Boys vs Girls Battle

=== Week 5 ===
- The show aired on April 26 because of the Easter holidays.

Running order

Order	Couple	Dance	Music	Judge's Scores			Total	Result
Order	Couple	Dance	Music	Gonzalez	Mabuse	Llambi	Total	Result
1	Nazan & Christian	Salsa	"Timbale" - Belle Perez	8	8	6	22	Safe
2	Evelyn & Evgeny	Tango	"Don't Stop the Music" - Rihanna	9	9	8	26	Safe
3	Ulrike & Robert	Paso doble	"Entre Dos Tierras" - Héroes del Silencio	9	9	7	25	Safe
4	Kerstin & Regina	Salsa	"Vamos A Bailar" - Gipsy Kings	3	3	1	7	Eliminated
5	Ella & Valentin	Samba	"Taki Taki" - DJ Snake ft. Selena Gomez, Ozuna, Cardi B	10	10	10	30	Safe
6	Sabrina & Erich	Waltz	"Can You Feel the Love Tonight" - Elton John	7	7	5	19	Bottom two
7	Barbara & Massimo	Charleston	"Bailar" - Deorro ft. Elvis Crespo	9	8	7	24	Safe
8	Pascal & Ekaterina	Quickstep	"Wenn nicht jetzt, wann dann? - Höhner	10	10	10	30	Safe
9	Oliver & Christina	Paso doble	"Bohemian Rhapsody" - Queen	7	7	6	20	Safe
10	Benjamin & Isabel	Rumba	"Shallow" - Lady Gaga & Bradley Cooper	10	9	8	27	Safe

=== Week 6 ===
Thema: Love Songs

- Musical guests: Davin Herbrüggen-"The River"

Running order

Order	Couple	Dance	Music	Judge's Scores			Total	Result
Order	Couple	Dance	Music	Gonzalez	Mabuse	Llambi	Total	Result
1	Barbara & Massimo	Paso doble	"You've Got the Love"-Florence and the Machine	9	8	5	22	Safe
2	Nazan & Christian	Charleston	"Five Foot Two, Eyes of Blue"-Art Landy	10	9	8	27	Safe
3	Ulrike & Robert	Contemporary	"Sailing"-LYO	8	7	8	23	Eliminated
4	Evelyn & Evgeny	Salsa	"Amores Como El Nuestro"-Jerry Rivera	7	7	5	19	Bottom three
5	Sabrina & Erich	Jive	"Part-Time Lover"-Stevie Wonder	5	5	2	12	Safe
6	Pascal & Ekaterina	Contemporary	"You Are the Reason"-Calum Scott	10	10	10	30	Safe
7	Benjamin & Isabel	Jive	"Don't Speak"-No Doubt	5	5	2	12	Safe
8	Oliver & Christina	Cha-cha-cha	"Relight My Fire"-Take That	5	5	3	13	Bottom two
9	Ella & Valentin	Tango	"Jalousie"-Jacob Gade	10	10	10	30	Safe

=== Week 7 ===
Running order

Order	Couple	Dance	Music	Judge's Scores			Total	Result
Order	Couple	Dance	Music	Gonzalez	Mabuse	Llambi	Total	Result
1	Evelyn & Evgeny	Charleston	"Bad Romance"-Lady Gaga	6	6	7	19	Bottom two
2	Barbara & Massimo	Samba	"X"-Nicky Jam & J Balvin	6	6	5	17	Bottom three
3	Nazan & Christian	Foxtrot	"What a Diff'rence a Day Makes!"-Dinah Washington	7	8	5	20	Safe
4	Sabrina & Erich	Paso doble	"Viva Espana"-Octavio Rojo y su Orquesta	5	5	2	12	Eliminated
5	Pascal & Ekaterina	Salsa	"Valió la Pena"-Marc Anthony	9	10	10	29	Safe
6	Ella & Valentin	Foxtrot	"Lieblingsmensch"-Namika	10	10	10	30	Safe
7	Oliver & Christina	Jive	"You Never Can Tell"-Chuck Berry	6	6	6	18	Safe
8	Benjamin & Isabel	Charleston	"Those Magnificent Men in their Flying Machines"-Central Band of the Royal Air Force	6	6	4	16	Safe
Teams Battle
1	Team Mabuse; Ella Endlich; Pascal Hens	Paso doble Rumba	"Gangsta's Paradise"-Coolio	10	X	10	20	Team Mabuse won the Teams Battle
2	Team Gonzalez; Barbara Becker; Benjamin Piwko; Nazan Eckes	Salsa; Cha-cha-cha	"Quimbara"-Celia Cruz	X	9	9	18	Team Mabuse won the Teams Battle
3	Team Llambi; Evelyn Burdecki; Oliver Pocher; Sabrina Mockenhaupt	Cha-cha-cha; Rumba	"Y.M.C.A."-Village People	8	8	X	16	Team Mabuse won the Teams Battle

=== Week 8 ===
Thema: TV-Melodien

Running order

Order	Couple	Dance	Music	Judge's Scores			Total	Result
Order	Couple	Dance	Music	Gonzalez	Mabuse	Llambi	Total	Result
1	Ella & Valentin	Jive	"Surfin' U.S.A."-The Beach Boys	10	9	10	29	Safe
2	Barbara & Massimo	Contemporary	"I Will Survive"-Gloria Gaynor	9	8	7	24	Bottom two
3	Evelyn & Evgeny	Rumba	"There You'll Be"-Faith Hill	6	6	6	18	Bottom three
4	Benjamin & Isabel	Salsa	"De Todo Un Poco"-Michael Lloyd & Le Disc	7	7	6	20	Safe
5	Nazan & Christian	Contemporary	"Stand by Me"-Ben E. King	10	10	10	30	Safe
6	Oliver & Christina	Rumba	"Goldfinger"-Goldfinger	7	7	7	21	Eliminated
7	Pascal & Ekaterina	Jive	"DuckTales"-DuckTales	10	10	8	28	Safe
Discofox Marathon
	Evelyn & Evgeny	Discofox Marathon	"Schakalaka Eyo"-Menderes "Sie sagte doch sie liebt mich"-Thomas Anders & Florian Silbereisen "Reiß die Hütte ab"-Mickie Krause "Nicht verdient"-Michelle & Matthias Reim "Weekend"-DJ Herzbeat ft. Sarah Lombardi "Mama Laudaaa"-Almklausi "Cordula Grün"-Josh.	1				Barbara & Massimo won the Discofox Marathon
	Benjamin & Isabel	Discofox Marathon	"Schakalaka Eyo"-Menderes "Sie sagte doch sie liebt mich"-Thomas Anders & Florian Silbereisen "Reiß die Hütte ab"-Mickie Krause "Nicht verdient"-Michelle & Matthias Reim "Weekend"-DJ Herzbeat ft. Sarah Lombardi "Mama Laudaaa"-Almklausi "Cordula Grün"-Josh.	2				Barbara & Massimo won the Discofox Marathon
	Pascal & Ekaterina	Discofox Marathon	"Schakalaka Eyo"-Menderes "Sie sagte doch sie liebt mich"-Thomas Anders & Florian Silbereisen "Reiß die Hütte ab"-Mickie Krause "Nicht verdient"-Michelle & Matthias Reim "Weekend"-DJ Herzbeat ft. Sarah Lombardi "Mama Laudaaa"-Almklausi "Cordula Grün"-Josh.	3				Barbara & Massimo won the Discofox Marathon
	Nazan & Christian	Discofox Marathon	"Schakalaka Eyo"-Menderes "Sie sagte doch sie liebt mich"-Thomas Anders & Florian Silbereisen "Reiß die Hütte ab"-Mickie Krause "Nicht verdient"-Michelle & Matthias Reim "Weekend"-DJ Herzbeat ft. Sarah Lombardi "Mama Laudaaa"-Almklausi "Cordula Grün"-Josh.	4				Barbara & Massimo won the Discofox Marathon
	Oliver & Christina	Discofox Marathon	"Schakalaka Eyo"-Menderes "Sie sagte doch sie liebt mich"-Thomas Anders & Florian Silbereisen "Reiß die Hütte ab"-Mickie Krause "Nicht verdient"-Michelle & Matthias Reim "Weekend"-DJ Herzbeat ft. Sarah Lombardi "Mama Laudaaa"-Almklausi "Cordula Grün"-Josh.	6				Barbara & Massimo won the Discofox Marathon
	Ella & Valentin	Discofox Marathon	"Schakalaka Eyo"-Menderes "Sie sagte doch sie liebt mich"-Thomas Anders & Florian Silbereisen "Reiß die Hütte ab"-Mickie Krause "Nicht verdient"-Michelle & Matthias Reim "Weekend"-DJ Herzbeat ft. Sarah Lombardi "Mama Laudaaa"-Almklausi "Cordula Grün"-Josh.	8				Barbara & Massimo won the Discofox Marathon
	Barbara & Massimo	Discofox Marathon	"Schakalaka Eyo"-Menderes "Sie sagte doch sie liebt mich"-Thomas Anders & Florian Silbereisen "Reiß die Hütte ab"-Mickie Krause "Nicht verdient"-Michelle & Matthias Reim "Weekend"-DJ Herzbeat ft. Sarah Lombardi "Mama Laudaaa"-Almklausi "Cordula Grün"-Josh.	10				Barbara & Massimo won the Discofox Marathon

=== Week 9 ===
Theme: Magic Moment

Running order

Order	Couple	Dance	Music	Judge's Scores			Total	Result
Order	Couple	Dance	Music	Gonzalez	Mabuse	Llambi	Total	Result
1	Nazan & Christian	Freestyle	"Seven Nation Army"-The White Stripes	10	10	9	29	Safe
2	Barbara & Massimo	Freestyle	"No Woman, No Cry"-Sheku Kanneh-Mason	9	8	6	23	Eliminated
3	Evelyn & Evgeny	Freestyle	"Wo willst du hin?"-Xavier Naidoo	8	8	6	22	Safe
4	Ella & Valentin	Freestyle	"Don't Give Up"-Peter Gabriel & Kate Bush	10	10	9	29	Bottom two
5	Pascal & Ekaterina	Freestyle	"Una Mattina"-Ludovico Einaudi	9	10	9	28	Safe
6	Benjamin & Isabel	Freestyle	"Unchained Melody"-The Righteous Brothers	10	10	10	30	Safe
Dance Duels
1	Nazan & Christian	Bollywood	"Jatt Ho Giya Sharabee"-Panjabi MC	10	9	9	28	Both couples won the Dance Duel
1	Ella & Valentin	Bollywood	"Jatt Ho Giya Sharabee"-Panjabi MC	10	9	9	28	Both couples won the Dance Duel
2	Barbara & Massimo	Street	"Talk Dirty"-Jason Derulo ft. 2 Chainz	8	8	7	23	Evelyn & Evgeny won the Dance Duel
2	Evelyn & Evgeny	Street	"Talk Dirty"-Jason Derulo ft. 2 Chainz	8	8	8	24	Evelyn & Evgeny won the Dance Duel
3	Pascal & Ekaterina	Flamenco	"Lel-Lere-Bay-Bay"-Manuel El Chachi	9	9	7	25	Benjamin & Isabel won the Dance Duel
3	Benjamin & Isabel	Flamenco	"Lel-Lere-Bay-Bay"-Manuel El Chachi	10	10	10	30	Benjamin & Isabel won the Dance Duel

=== Week 10 ===
Running order

Order	Couple	Dance	Music	Judge's Scores			Total	Result
Order	Couple	Dance	Music	Gonzalez	Mabuse	Llambi	Total	Result
1	Ella & Valentin	Charleston	"Supercalifragilisticexpialidocious"-Julie Andrews & Dick Van Dyke	10	10	10	30	Safe
2	Nazan & Christian	Samba	"Everyway That I Can"-Sertab Erener	8	8	7	23	Bottom two
3	Pascal & Ekaterina	Foxtrot	"Go Gentle"-Robbie Williams	10	10	9	29	Safe
4	Evelyn & Evgeny	Waltz	"Without You"-Mariah Carey	7	7	6	20	Eliminated
5	Benjamin & Isabel	Tango	"Diferente"-Gotan Project	9	9	9	27	Safe
Trio-Dance
1	Nazan & Christian (with Massimo Sinato)	Tango	"A Media Luz"-Carlos Gardel	10	10	9	29	
2	Pascal & Ekaterina (with Marta Arndt)	Charleston	"Entry of the Gladiators"-Julius Fučík	9	8	8	25	
3	Evelyn & Evgeny (with Robert Beitsch)	Paso doble	"Free Your Mind"-En Vogue	6	7	6	19	
4	Benjamin & Isabel (with Regina Luca)	Samba	"Aquarela do Brasil"-Antônio Carlos Jobim	6	7	5	18	
5	Ella & Valentin (with Renata Lusin)	Rumba	"Lovesong"-Adele	10	10	10	30	

=== Week 11: Semi-final ===
Running order

Order	Couple	Dance	Music	Judge's Scores			Total	Result
Order	Couple	Dance	Music	Gonzalez	Mabuse	Llambi	Total	Result
1	Nazan & Christian	Jive	"Follow Me"-The Baseballs	8	8	7	23	Eliminated
1	Nazan & Christian	Paso doble	"Malagueña"-Ernesto Lecuona	10	10	9	29	Eliminated
2	Ella & Valentin	Cha-cha-cha	"Body"-Loud Luxury	10	10	10	30	Safe
2	Ella & Valentin	Paso doble	"Explosive"-Bond	10	10	10	30	Safe
3	Pascal & Ekaterina	Paso doble	"Another Brick in the Wall"-Pink Floyd	8	9	8	25	Bottom two
3	Pascal & Ekaterina	Samba	"Con Calma"-Daddy Yankee ft. Snow	7	8	6	21	Bottom two
4	Benjamin & Isabel	Foxtrot	"Smells Like Teen Spirit"-Nirvana	8	8	6	22	Safe
4	Benjamin & Isabel	Contemporary	"Musik Nur Wenn Sie Laut Ist"-Herbert Grönemeyer	9	9	8	26	Safe
Impro Dance Extreme
1	Nazan & Christian	Tango	"Sway"-The Pussycat Dolls	9	9	8	26	
2	Ella & Valentin	Salsa	"Noche De Copas"-María Conchita Alonso	10	10	10	30	
3	Pascal & Ekaterina	Rumba	"Baby Can I Hold You"-Tracy Chapman	9	9	8	26	
4	Benjamin & Isabel	Waltz	"If You Don't Know Me by Now"-Simply Red	9	9	8	26	

=== Week 12: Final ===
Running order

Order	Couple	Dance	Music	Judge's Scores			Total	Result
Order	Couple	Dance	Music	Gonzalez	Mabuse	Llambi	Total	Result
1	Benjamin & Isabel	Cha-cha-cha	"Cake by the Ocean"-DNCE	8	8	7	23	Third Place
1	Benjamin & Isabel	Rumba	"Shallow" - Lady Gaga & Bradley Cooper	10	9	9	28	Third Place
1	Benjamin & Isabel	Freestyle	Medley of Game of Thrones	10	10	10	30	Third Place
2	Ella & Valentin	Quickstep	"The Lady Is a Tramp"-Frank Sinatra	10	10	10	30	Runner-up
2	Ella & Valentin	Samba	"Taki Taki" - DJ Snake ft. Selena Gomez, Ozuna, Cardi B	10	10	10	30	Runner-up
2	Ella & Valentin	Freestyle	Medley of Kill Bill	10	10	10	30	Runner-up
3	Pascal & Ekaterina	Tango	"Por una Cabeza"-Carlos Gardel	10	10	10	30	Winner
3	Pascal & Ekaterina	Salsa	"Valió la Pena"-Marc Anthony	10	10	10	30	Winner
3	Pascal & Ekaterina	Freestyle	Medley of Madagascar	10	10	10	30	Winner

== Dance chart ==
Highest scoring dance
Lowest scoring dance
Was not scored (encore performance in the finale)
The pair did not perform this week

Couple	Launch	Week 1	Week 2	Week 3	Week 4		Week 5	Week 6	Week 7		Week 8		Week 9		Week 10		Week 11			Week 12		
Pascal & Ekaterina	Viennese waltz	Viennese waltz	Tango	Cha-cha-cha	Rumba	Freestyle	Quickstep	Contemporary	Salsa	Team Mabuse	Jive	Discofox	Freestyle	Flamenco	Foxtrot	Charleston	Paso doble	Samba	Rumba	Tango	Salsa	Freestyle
Ella & Valentin	Quickstep	Quickstep	Contemporary	Salsa	Viennese waltz	Freestyle	Samba	Tango	Foxtrot	Team Mabuse	Jive	Discofox	Freestyle	Bollywood	Charleston	Rumba	Cha-cha-cha	Paso doble	Salsa	Quickstep	Samba	Freestyle
Benjamin & Isabel	Viennese waltz	Waltz	Cha-cha-cha	Quickstep	Paso doble	Freestyle	Rumba	Jive	Charleston	Team Gonzalez	Salsa	Discofox	Freestyle	Flamenco	Tango	Samba	Foxtrot	Contemporary	Waltz	Cha-cha-cha	Rumba	Freestyle
Nazan & Christian	Cha-cha-cha	Cha-cha-cha	Viennese waltz	Quickstep	Rumba	Freestyle	Salsa	Charleston	Foxtrot	Team Gonzalez	Contemporary	Discofox	Freestyle	Bollywood	Samba	Tango	Jive	Paso doble	Tango			Paso doble
Evelyn & Evgeny	Cha-cha-cha	Cha-cha-cha	Foxtrot	Contemporary	Jive	Freestyle	Tango	Salsa	Charleston	Team Llambi	Rumba	Discofox	Freestyle	Street	Waltz	Paso doble						Tango
Barbara & Massimo	Quickstep	Quickstep	Cha-cha-cha	Rumba	Tango	Freestyle	Charleston	Paso doble	Samba	Team Gonzalez	Contemporary	Discofox	Freestyle	Street								Tango
Oliver & Christina	Salsa	Salsa	Tango	Charleston	Contemporary	Freestyle	Paso doble	Cha-cha-cha	Jive	Team Llambi	Rumba	Discofox										Paso doble
Sabrina & Erich	Cha-cha-cha	Cha-cha-cha	Tango	Salsa	Contemporary	Freestyle	Waltz	Jive	Paso doble	Team Llambi												Tango
Ulrike & Robert	Quickstep	Quickstep	Rumba	Tango	Waltz	Freestyle	Paso doble	Contemporary														Paso doble
Kerstin & Regina	Waltz	Waltz	Cha-cha-cha	Tango	Charleston	Freestyle	Salsa															Waltz
Thomas & Kathrin	Viennese waltz	Viennese waltz	Cha-cha-cha	Jive	Tango	Freestyle																Cha-cha-cha
Lukas & Katja	Salsa	Salsa	Contemporary	Quickstep																		Salsa
Özcan & Marta	Salsa	Salsa	Jive																			Salsa
Jan & Renata	Waltz	Viennese waltz																				Viennese waltz
