= Welttournee =

Related
- Website: der-reisepodcast.de

Welttournee is a German-speaking biweekly travel podcast moderated by Adrian Klie and Christoph Streicher. It has been published since January 2019. In the podcast, the two producers report “... how you can get to know the world with a full-time job, 30 days of regular vacation and little money” In the general iTunes podcast charts in Germany, the podcast reached the top of number 27 on July 7, 2019. On July 27, 2020, it was still at number 90 and was in the charts for a total of 55 days. In 2019 it was named one of the best podcast shows of the year by Apple Podcast. In addition to the podcast, the two podcasters also host live shows and can be seen as speakers at various trade fairs and conferences such as the ITB as speakers.

== History ==
The first episode of the podcast appeared in January 2019 on various streaming platforms. There is also a channel on YouTube, but this is negligible for the podcast format and is only used for videos from live performances. Over 80 episodes have appeared since it was launched. New episodes usually appear every two weeks on Saturdays. They summarize a country briefly and concisely in 30 minutes. Since the two creators have residences in Hamburg and Barcelona, the podcast is recorded and edited from these different locations.

== Content ==
The two moderators talk about their travel experiences in the episodes. The two full-time workers have already explored more than 100 countries. “How do you pack lightly and how can you save when traveling? Adrian Klie and Christoph Streicher have [...] practical tips plus funny stories about their own travels across the world and through their favorite continent, Europe. " It is also about alternative forms of travel. "Because the travelers have little money but a lot of creative solutions, they don't stay in luxury hotels, but sometimes camp under trees and take the night train". In addition to their own experiences, prominent guests regularly report on their travels. Mickie Krause, the Berlin based band MiA and Clemens Rehbein from Milky Chance were guests.

== Reception ==
The Süddeutsche Zeitung recommended the podcast in its "Podcast of the Month" section in May 2019. The GEO Saison editors referred to the podcast in their "April selection". Hitradio Ö3 invited the podcasters to their show "Treffpunkt Podcast". The radio broadcaster Bayern 3 hosted the two podcasters in their show on "Podcast Recommendations" in December. In addition, the two of them are interview guests at the radio station 1Live and NDR1, where they comment on current travel topics. The podcast was looking for applicants for the "Mission Backpacker" from the young radio stations - due to the Corona crisis, however, the project was postponed by ARD. For the TV magazine Galileo the two reported on the "trend travel destination Georgia". Together with WDR, they produced two contributions for the social media channels. In addition, reference was made to the podcast in other national and international media.

== Awards ==
Apple iTunes has recommended the podcast as one of the "Podcast Shows of the Year 2019".
