= Discofox =

European social partner dance

Discofox or disco fox is a social partner dance which evolved in Europe in the mid-1970s as a rediscovery of the dance hold in the improvisational disco dance scene dominated by solo dancing, approximately at the same time when the hustle emerged in the United States. Both dances were greatly influenced by Saturday Night Fever starring John Travolta. In various regions, it is also known under different names: disco hustle, swing fox, disco swing, and rock fox.

Discofox is popular in Austria, Germany, Poland, Switzerland, as well as in Russia.

Discofox may be danced to a wide variety of 2/4 and 4/4 music such as 1970s disco, 1980s Eurodisco, Italo disco, disco polo, pop, and techno. Tempo may vary. In a social setting it is mostly danced in one place, although the couple may also move across the dance floor. It is danced with various types of single and double handhold. Among the figures are various handwraps, spins, throw-outs/catches, poses, drops, and for competitions also acrobatic figures.

There are international competitions in discofox.

== Basic timing and step ==
The beginner's count of the basic step is "step-step-tap". Advanced dancers use the hustle-style split-beat four-step basic (still occupying 3 beats of music), counted variously: (1,2, & 3), (1,2, a3) (1,2, 3&), (1,2, 3a).
