= Mickie Krause =

German singer

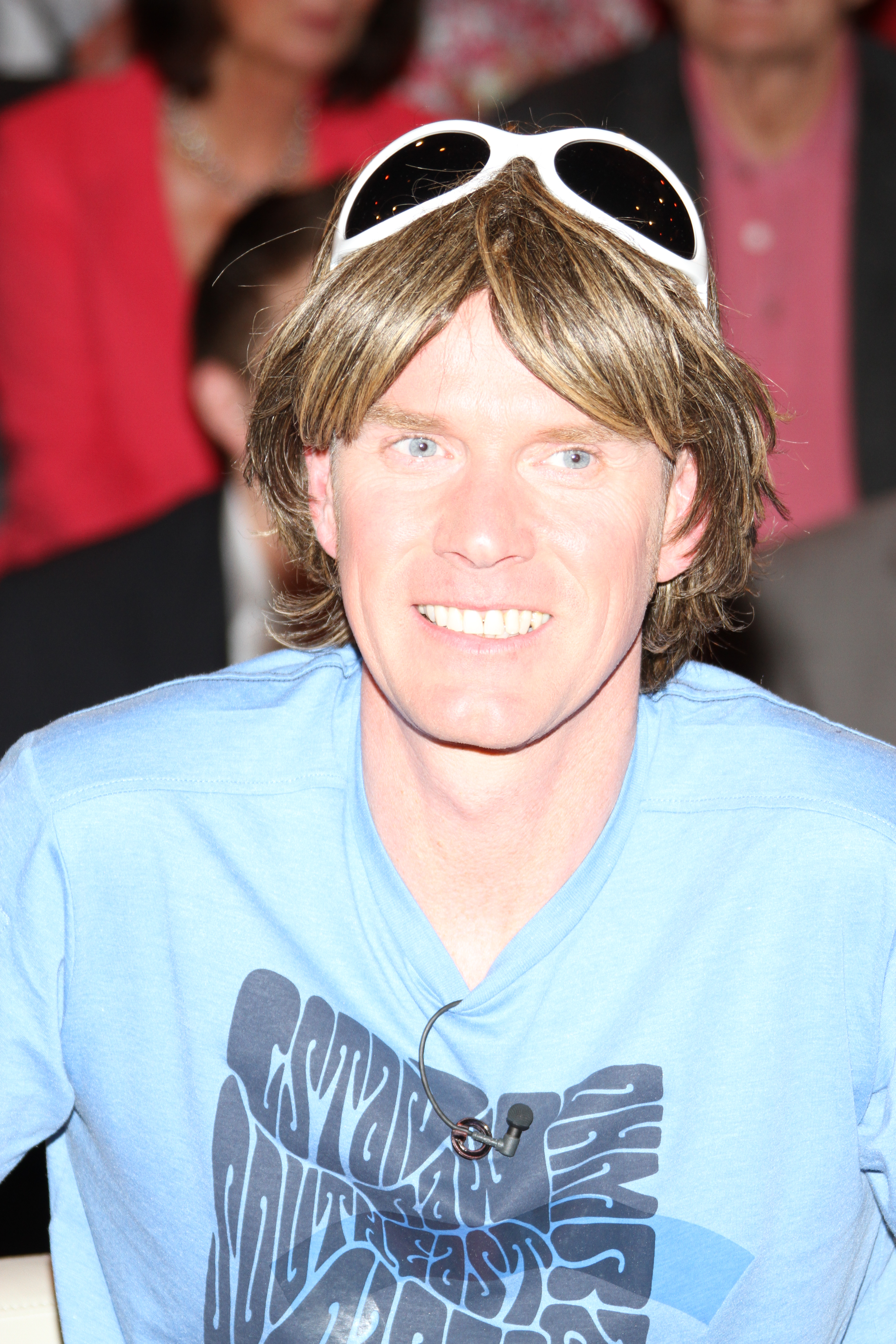
Mickie Krause in 2012

Mickie Krause (born Michael Engels on June 21, 1970), a native of Wettringen, is a singer of German Schlager. His notoriety exploded in Germany in 1999 with his hit "Zehn nackte Friseusen" ("Ten naked Hairdressers").

== Discography ==
=== Albums ===
- 2000: Ok folgendes - Meine Erfolge größten Teil 2 (2001, 3 We., Place 85)
- 2003: Krausealarm - Das beste Partyalbum der Welt (2003, 26 We., Place 76)
- 2006: Wie Blei in den Regalen (2006, 33 We., 33 Place 56)
- 2007: Vom Mund in die Orgel - Mickie Krause singt die schönsten und Fahrten- Wanderlieder!

=== Singles ===
- 1998: Anita '98
- 1999: Olé wir fahr'n in Puff nach Barcelona (Olé we're off to a brothel in Barcelona)
- 1999: Zehn nackte Friseusen (Ten naked hairdressers)
- 2000: Zeig doch mal die Möpse (Show me the boobs)
- 2000: Der Ober bricht Megamix (The waiter pukes)
- 2001: Geh doch zuhause, du alte Scheiße (Just go home, you old shit)
- 2001: Mallorca Allstars - Sie kommen um deine Party zu retten (with Mirja Boes and Sound Convoy) (Majorca all-stars - they'll come to save your party)
- 2002: Reiß die Hütte ab (Tear the house down)
- 2003: Du bist zu blöd um ausm Busch zu winken (You're too stupid to wave from a bush)
- 2004: Wirft der Arsch auch Falten (Even if your ass has wrinkles)
- 2005: Alle total versaut (Everyone totally filthy)
- 2005: Ich will ne Frau ohne Arschgeweih (I want a woman without a tramp stamp, lower-back tattoo)
- 2006: Laudato si
- 2006: Kumbaja
- 2007: Finger im Po, Mexiko (Finger in butt, Mexico)
- 2008: Wir ham' St. Anton überlebt (with Jürgen Milski) (We survived St. Anton)
- 2008: Ich glaub hier ist doch wieder Alkohol im Spiel (I think alcohol is involved again)
- 2008: Orange trägt nur die Müllabfuhr (Only garbage men wear orange) (Go West)
- 2008: Supa Deutschland (Supa (Super) Germany)
- 2008: Jan Pillemann Otze (Jan Dick Unt)
- 2011: Schatzi, schenk mir ein Foto (Honey, send me a photo)
- 2012: Nur noch Schuhe an (Only wearing shoes)
- 2014: Geh mal Bier hol'n (GmBh) (Go get beer)
- 2014: Rot sind die Rosen (feat. Ingrid & Klaus) (The roses are red)
- 2014: Schalala nach Hause (with Jan Zerbst) (Shalala home)
- 2014: Die Nummer 1 der Welt sind wir (we are number 1 in the world)
- 2015: Biste braun, kriegste Fraun (If you're brown you'll get women)
- 2016: Wir sind die Kinder vom Süderhof (We are the kids from Süderhof)
- 2019: Eine Woche wach
