= Let's Dance (German TV series) season 4 =

Let's Dance
- Season 4
- Celebrity winner: Maite Kelly
- Professional winner: Christian Polanc
- No. of episodes: 9

Release
- Original network: RTL Television
- Original release: March 23 – May 18, 2011

Season chronology
- ← Previous; Season 3 Next → Season 5

The fourth season of Let's Dance began on 23 March 2011.

The judges for this season were confirmed in March 2011 as Joachim Llambi, Harald Glööckler, Motsi Mabuse as a replacement of Isabel Edvardsson and Roman Frieling as a replacement of Peter Kraus. It was reported in February 2011 that Isabel Edvardsson and Peter Kraus would not return in season 4, after being judges for only one series.

== Couples ==
Celebrity	Occupation	Professional Partner	Status
Regina Halmich	Boxer	Sergiy Plyuta	Eliminated 1st on March 23, 2011
Tim Lobinger	Olympic athlete	Isabel Edvardsson	Eliminated 2nd on March 30, 2011
Andrea Sawatzki	Actress	Stefano Terrazzino	Eliminated 3rd on April 6, 2011
Kristina Bach	Singer	Erich Klann	Withdrew on April 18, 2011
Bernd Herzsprung	Actor	Nina Uszkureit	Eliminated 5th on April 20, 2011
Jörn Schlönvoigt	Actor	Helena Kaschurow	Eliminated 6th on April 27, 2011
Liliana Matthäus	Lothar Matthäus's ex-wife	Massimo Sinató	Eliminated 7th on May 4, 2011
Thomas Karaoglan	Singer	Sarah Latton	Third Place on May 11, 2011
Moritz A. Sachs	Actor	Melissa Ortiz-Gomez	Runners-Up on May 18, 2011
Maite Kelly	Singer	Christian Polanc	Winners on May 18, 2011

=== Judges scores ===
Couple	Place	1	2	3	4	5	6	7	8	9
Maite & Christian	1	25	27	30	25	34	29+6=35	32+35=67	36+34=70	35+39+39=113
Moritz & Melissa	2	22	24	23	25	26	25+4=29	26+28=54	35+36=71	36+38+38=112
Thomas & Sarah	3	13	11	22	20	18	19+10=29	23+19=42	26+24=50	
Liliana & Massimo	4	20	26	23	23	26	30+8=38	24+31=55		
Jörn & Helena	5	18	19	21	23	18	15+2=17			
Bernd & Nina	6	19	24	-	28	25				
Kristina & Erich	7	14	16	17	11					
Andrea & Stefano	8	19	22	20						
Tim & Isabel	9	18	15							
Regina & Sergiy	10	17								

Red numbers indicate the lowest score for each week.
Green numbers indicate the highest score for each week.
indicates the couple eliminated that week.
indicates the returning couples that finished in the bottom three or bottom two.
indicates the couple was eliminated but later returned to the competition.
indicates the couple withdrew.
indicated the couple that did not dance due personal reasons.
indicates the winning couple.
indicates the runner-up couple.

== Weekly scores and songs ==
=== Week 1 ===
Individual judges scores in charts below (given in parentheses) are listed in this order from left to right: Roman Frieling, Harald Glööckler, Motsi Mabuse, Joachim Llambi.

Running order

Couple	Score	Style	Music
Jörn & Helena	18 (4,7,4,3)	Cha-Cha-Cha	"Break Your Heart" - Taio Cruz
Andrea & Stefano	19 (5,6,5,3)	Waltz	"She" - Elvis Costello
Tim & Isabel	18 (5,6,5,2)	Waltz	"Somewhere over the Rainbow" - Israel Kamakawiwoʻole
Moritz & Melissa	22 (4,7,7,4)	Waltz	"Are You Lonesome Tonight?" - Elvis Presley
Kristina & Erich	14 (2,6,4,2)	Cha-Cha-Cha	"Er gehört zu mir" - Marianne Rosenberg
Bernd & Nina	19 (4,8,6,1)	Waltz	"Don't Let the Sun Go Down on Me" - Elton John
Maite & Christian	25 (6,8,7,4)	Cha-Cha-Cha	"I Should Be So Lucky" - Kylie Minogue
Regina & Sergiy	17 (5,6,4,2)	Waltz	"Conquest of Paradise" - Vangelis
Liliana & Massimo	20 (6,6,5,3)	Waltz	"You Raise Me Up" - Westlife
Thomas & Sarah	13 (3,6,3,1)	Cha-Cha-Cha	"Das geht ab" - Frauenarzt

=== Week 2 ===
Running order

Couple	Score	Style	Music
Tim & Isabel	15 (4,5,4,2)	Rumba	"Sexual Healing" - Marvin Gaye
Jörn & Helena	19 (5,8,4,2)	Quickstep	"Stay the Night" - James Blunt
Moritz & Melissa	24 (6,8,6,4)	Rumba	"Take My Breath Away" - Berlin
Bernd & Nina	24 (5,9,6,4)	Rumba	"GoldenEye" - Tina Turner
Thomas & Sarah	11 (2,5,3,1)	Quickstep	"Männer" - Herbert Grönemeyer
Liliana & Massimo	26 (7,9,5,5)	Rumba	"Just the Way You Are" - Bruno Mars
Kristina & Erich	16 (5,6,3,2)	Quickstep	"Nah Neh Nah" - Vaya Con Dios
Andrea & Stefano	22 (6,8,5,3)	Rumba	"True Colors" - Cyndi Lauper
Maite & Christian	27 (7,9,7,4)	Quickstep	"Bei Mir Bistu Shein"

=== Week 3 ===
Bernd Herzsprung chose not to participate this week due to the recent death of his mother.

Running order

Couple	Score	Style	Music
Jörn & Helena	21 (5,8,4,4)	Jive	"Shake It" - Metro Station
Kristina & Erich	17 (4,7,5,1)	Tango	"Gimme! Gimme! Gimme! (A Man After Midnight)" - ABBA
Andrea & Stefano	20 (6,7,5,2)	Jive	"Elektrisches Gefühl" - Juli
Liliana & Massimo	23 (6,8,5,4)	Tango	"Por una Cabeza" - Carlos Gardel
Moritz & Melissa	23 (5,7,8,3)	Jive	"I'm Still Standing" - Elton John
Thomas & Sarah	22 (10,6,4,2)	Tango	"Push It" - Salt-N-Pepa
Maite & Christian	30 (7,9,9,5)	Jive	"Ich will keine Schokolade" - Trude Herr

=== Week 4 ===
Running order

Couple	Score	Style	Music
Jörn & Helena	23 (6,7,6,4)	Salsa	"36 Grad" - 2Raumwohnung
Moritz & Melissa	25 (6,8,8,3)	Viennese Waltz	"Stop!" - Sam Brown
Liliana & Massimo	23 (5,8,6,4)	Salsa	"Mambo Italiano" - Dean Martin
Bernd & Nina	28 (5,9,8,6)	Viennese Waltz	"Unchained Melody" - The Righteous Brothers
Kristina & Erich	11 (3,4,3,1)	Salsa	"Que sera mi vida" - Gibson Brothers
Maite & Christian	25 (7,8,8,2)	Viennese Waltz	"Küss mich, halt mich, lieb mich" - Ella Endlich
Thomas & Sarah	20 (5,7,5,3)	Viennese Waltz	"Breathe Easy" - Blue

=== Week 5 ===
Running order

Couple	Score	Style	Music
Moritz & Melissa	26 (5,8,8,5)	Samba	"That's the Way (I Like It)" - KC and the Sunshine Band
Jörn & Helena	18 (5,6,5,2)	Paso Doble	"Bring Me to Life" - Evanescence
Bernd & Nina	25 (6,9,6,4)	Samba	"Aquarela do Brasil"
Thomas & Sarah	18 (5,8,3,2)	Paso Doble	"James Bond Theme"
Maite & Christian	34 (8,10,10,6)	Paso Doble	"Habanera"
Liliana & Massimo	26 (7,8,7,4)	Paso Doble	"Wonderful Life" - Hurts

=== Week 6 ===
Running order

Couple	Score	Style	Music
Thomas & Sarah	19 (5,6,5,3)	Salsa	"Monsta" - Culcha Candela
Jörn & Helena	15 (2,6,5,2)	Rumba	"Feel" - Robbie Williams
Moritz & Melissa	25 (7,7,8,3)	Quickstep	"Probier's mal mit Gemütlichkeit" - Bill Ramsey
Liliana & Massimo	30 (7,10,7,6)	Cha-Cha-Cha	"California Gurls" - Katy Perry
Maite & Christian	29 (8,9,9,3)	Samba	"Summer Dreaming" - Kate Yanai
Thomas & Sarah; Liliana & Massimo; Maite & Christian; Moritz & Melissa; Jörn & Helena	10; 8; 6; 4; 2	Discofox	"On the Radio" - Donna Summer "Looking for Freedom" - David Hasselhoff "Sing Hallelujah" - Dr. Alban "Crying at the Discoteque" - Alcazar "Tik Tok" - Kesha

=== Week 7 ===
Running order

Couple	Score	Style	Music
Liliana & Massimo	24 (7,8,6,3)	Jive	"Candyman" - Christina Aguilera
Liliana & Massimo	31 (8,10,7,6)	Viennese Waltz	"Se bastasse una canzone" - Eros Ramazzotti
Maite & Christian	32 (7,10,9,6)	Tango	"Palladio Allegretto" - Bond
Maite & Christian	35 (8,10,10,7)	Rumba	"Eternal Flame" - The Bangles
Thomas & Sarah	23 (6,8,5,4)	Rumba	"Reality" - Richard Sanderson
Thomas & Sarah	19 (6,6,5,2)	Jive	"Major Tom (Coming Home)" - Peter Schilling
Moritz & Melissa	26 (7,7,7,5)	Cha-Cha-Cha	"Relight My Fire" - Take That
Moritz & Melissa	28 (6,9,9,4)	Paso Doble	"The Final Countdown" - Europe

=== Week 8 ===
Running order

Couple	Score	Style	Music
Thomas & Sarah	26 (7,9,6,4)	Samba	"Stayin' Alive" - Bee Gees
Thomas & Sarah	24 (7,8,5,4)	Waltz	"Apologize" - OneRepublic
Moritz & Melissa	35 (8,10,10,7)	Tango	"Jalousie" - Xavier Cugat
Moritz & Melissa	36 (8,10,10,8)	Salsa	"Baila me" - Gipsy Kings
Maite & Christian	36 (9,10,10,7)	Salsa	"Maria" - Ricky Martin
Maite & Christian	34 (9,10,9,6)	Waltz	"You Light Up My Life" - Debby Boone

=== Week 9 ===
Running order

Couple	Score	Style	Music
Moritz & Melissa	36 (9,10,9,8)	Samba	"That's the Way (I Like It)" - KC and the Sunshine Band
Moritz & Melissa	38 (9,10,10,9)	Viennese Waltz	"Stop!" - Sam Brown
Moritz & Melissa	38 (10,9,10,9)	Freestyle	"Queen - Medley: We Will Rock You/Don't Stop Me Now/We Are the Champions"
Maite & Christian	35 (9,10,9,7)	Quickstep	"Bei Mir Bistu Shein"
Maite & Christian	39 (10,10,10,9)	Paso Doble	"Habanera"
Maite & Christian	39 (10,10,10,9)	Freestyle	"Moulin Rouge! - Medley: Lady Marmalade/El Tango de Roxanne/Your Song"

== Dance Chart ==
- Week 1: Cha-Cha-Cha or Waltz
- Week 2: Rumba or Quickstep
- Week 3: Jive or Tango
- Week 4: Viennese Waltz or Salsa
- Week 5: Paso Doble or Samba
- Week 6: One unlearned dance and Fox-a-thon
- Week 7: Two unlearned dances from previous shows
- Week 8: Two unlearned dances from previous shows
- Finals: Judges Redemption Dance, Favourite dance of the Season, Freestyle

Couple	1	2	3	4	5	6		7		8		9		
Maite & Christian	Cha-Cha-Cha	Quickstep	Jive	Viennese Waltz	Paso Doble	Samba	Discofox	Tango	Rumba	Salsa	Waltz	Quickstep	Paso Doble	Freestyle
Moritz & Melissa	Waltz	Rumba	Jive	Viennese Waltz	Samba	Quickstep	Discofox	Cha-Cha-Cha	Paso Doble	Tango	Salsa	Samba	Viennese Waltz	Freestyle
Thomas & Sarah	Cha-Cha-Cha	Quickstep	Tango	Viennese Waltz	Paso Doble	Salsa	Discofox	Rumba	Jive	Samba	Waltz			
Liliana & Massimo	Waltz	Rumba	Tango	Salsa	Paso Doble	Cha-Cha-Cha	Discofox	Jive	Viennese Waltz					
Jörn & Helena	Cha-Cha-Cha	Quickstep	Jive	Salsa	Paso Doble	Rumba	Discofox							
Bernd & Nina	Waltz	Rumba		Viennese Waltz	Samba									
Kristina & Erich	Cha-Cha-Cha	Quickstep	Tango	Salsa										
Andrea & Stefano	Waltz	Rumba	Jive											
Tim & Isabel	Waltz	Rumba												
Regina & Sergiy	Waltz													
