= Let's Dance (German TV series) season 7 =

Let's Dance
- Season 7
- Celebrity winner: Alexander Klaws
- Professional winner: Isabel Edvardsson
- No. of episodes: 9

Release
- Original network: RTL Television
- Original release: March 28 – May 30, 2014

Season chronology
- ← Previous; Season 6 Next → Season 8

The seventh season of Let's Dance began on 28 March 2014. Sylvie Meis and Daniel Hartwich returned as hosts. Motsi Mabuse, Joachim Llambi and Jorge González returned as judges. For the first time, all judges return to the judging panel in the same constellation.

== Couples ==
Celebrity	Occupation	Professional Partner	Status
Patrice Bouédibéla	Television presenter	Ekaterina Leonova	Eliminated 1st on March 28, 2014
Cindy Berger	Singer, member of Cindy and Bert	Marius Iepure	Eliminated 2nd on April 4, 2014
Dirk Moritz	Actor	Katja Kalugina	Eliminated 3rd on April 11, 2014
Bernhard Brink	Singer	Sarah Latton	Eliminated 4th on April 25, 2014
Alexander Leipold	Wrestler	Oana Nechiti	Eliminated 5th on May 2, 2014
Lilly Becker	Boris Becker's wife	Erich Klann	Eliminated 6th on May 9, 2014
Larissa Marolt	Model	Massimo Sinato	Eliminated 7th on May 16, 2014
Carmen Geiss	Wife of Robert Geiss	Christian Polanc	Third Place on May 23, 2014
Tanja Szewczenko	Former figure skater	Willi Gabalier	Runners-Up on May 30, 2014
Alexander Klaws	Singer	Isabel Edvardsson	Winner on May 30, 2014

== Judges’ scores ==
Couple	Place	1	2	3	4	5	6	7	8	9
Alexander K. & Isabel	1	24	27	26	30+10=40	17+29=46	26+23=49	23+22=45	29+29+27=85	27+30+30=87
Tanja & Willi	2	15	20	27	25+10=35	17+26=43	21+29=50	30+23=53	21+27+25=73	20+29+29=78
Carmen & Christian	3	15	18	15	17+6=23	17+22=39	17+20=37	19+17=36	13+20+19=52	
Larissa & Massimo	4	15	22	16	16+2=18	17+18=35	23+21=44	22+23=45		
Lilly & Erich	5	17	20	14	21+4=25	17+22=39	24+15=39			
Alexander L. & Oana	6	20	12	21	17+3=20	17+13=30				
Bernhard & Sarah	7	5	8	4	4+1=5					
Dirk & Katja	8	11	12	12						
Cindy & Marius	9	12	5							
Patrice & Ekaterina	10	9								

Red numbers indicates the lowest score for each week.
Green numbers indicates the highest score for each week.
indicates the couple eliminated that week.
indicates the returning couple that finished in the bottom two/three.
indicates the winning couple.
indicates the runner-up couple.
indicates the third-place couple.

== Weekly scores and songs ==
Unless indicated otherwise, individual judges scores in the charts below (given in parentheses) are listed in this order from left to right: Jorge Gonzalez, Motsi Mabuse and Joachim Llambi.

=== Week 1 ===
Running order

Couple	Score	Dance	Music	Result
Alexander K. & Isabel	24 (8,8,8)	Quickstep	"You Can't Hurry Love" — The Supremes	Safe
Bernhard & Sarah	5 (2,2,1)	Cha-Cha-Cha	"U Can't Touch This" — MC Hammer	Bottom Two
Patrice & Ekaterina	9 (4,3,2)	Cha-Cha-Cha	"Blurred Lines" — Robin Thicke	Eliminated
Cindy & Marius	12 (5,4,3)	Waltz	"Komm Leg Deinen Arm Um Mich" — Esther Ofarim	Safe
Tanja & Willi	15 (6,5,4)	Quickstep	"The Look" — Roxette	Bottom Three
Alexander L. & Oana	20 (8,7,5)	Waltz	"Applaus, Applaus" — Sportfreunde Stiller	Safe
Carmen & Christian	15 (6,5,4)	Cha-Cha-Cha	"Welcome to St. Tropez" — DJ Antoine	Safe
Dirk & Katja	11 (5,4,2)	Quickstep	"Whatever" — Cro	Safe
Lilly & Erich	17 (7,6,4)	Waltz	"If I Ain't Got You" — Alicia Keys	Safe
Larissa & Massimo	15 (6,6,3)	Cha-Cha-Cha	"Hard Out Here" — Lily Allen	Safe

=== Week 2 ===
Running order

Couple	Score	Dance	Music	Result
Tanja & Willi	20 (8,7,5)	Jive	"Fallschirm" — MIA.	Safe
Dirk & Katja	12 (5,5,2)	Contemporary	"Für immer und Dich" — Rio Reiser	Bottom Two
Carmen & Christian	18 (7,7,4)	Foxtrot	"Material Girl" — Richard Cheese	Safe
Cindy & Marius	5 (2,2,1)	Contemporary	"Total Eclipse of the Heart" — Bonnie Tyler	Eliminated
Lilly & Erich	20 (8,7,5)	Jive	"Happy" — Pharrell Williams	Safe
Bernhard & Sarah	8 (3,3,2)	Foxtrot	"Liebe ohne Leiden" — Udo Jürgens	Safe
Alexander L. & Oana	12 (5,4,3)	Jive	"I Don't Dance" — Sunrise Avenue	Bottom Three
Larissa & Massimo	22 (9,8,5)	Contemporary	"Girl On Fire" — Alicia Keys	Safe
Alexander K. & Isabel	27 (10,9,8)	Jive	"Hey Ya!" — Outkast	Safe

=== Week 3 ===
Running order

Couple	Score	Dance	Music	Result
Lilly & Erich	14 (6,5,3)	Cha-Cha-Cha	"You're the First, the Last, My Everything" — Barry White	Bottom Three
Dirk & Katja	12 (5,5,2)	Jive	"History of Everything" — Barenaked Ladies	Eliminated
Bernhard & Sarah	4 (2,1,1)	Paso Doble	"Bonanza Theme Song"	Bottom Two
Tanja & Willi	27 (10,10,7)	Rumba	"Liebe ist" — Nena	Safe
Carmen & Christian	15 (6,5,4)	Jive	"I'm Always Here" — Jimi Jamison	Safe
Alexander L. & Oana	21 (8,7,6)	Foxtrot	"The Unknown Stuntman" — Lee Majors	Safe
Alexander K. & Isabel	26 (10,9,7)	Rumba	"Chasing Cars" — Snow Patrol	Safe
Larissa & Massimo	16 (7,7,2)	Quickstep	"Hey, Pippi Langstrumpf" — Jan Johansson	Safe

=== Week 4 ===
Running order

Couple	Score	Dance	Music	Result
Tanja & Willi	25 (10,8,7)	Bollywood	"Mundian To Bach Ke" — Panjabi MC	Safe
Bernhard & Sarah	4 (1,1,2)	Charleston	"Puttin' On The Ritz" — Miss Kookie (Fred Astaire)	Eliminated
Larissa & Massimo	16 (6,7,3)	Bollywood	"Jai Ho! (You Are My Destiny)" — The Pussycat Dolls	Bottom Three
Alexander L. & Oana	17 (6,6,5)	Hip-Hop	"Informer" — Snow	Bottom Two
Lilly & Erich	21 (8,7,6)	Charleston	"We No Speak Americano" — Yolanda Be Cool	Safe
Carmen & Christian	17 (6,6,5)	Bollywood	"Jogi" — Panjabi MC	Safe
Alexander K. & Isabel	30 (10,10,10)	Charleston	"Dick & Doof Theme" — Fred Strittmatter & Quirin Amper jr.	Safe
Bernhard & Sarah; Larissa & Massimo; Alexander L. & Oana; Lilly & Erich; Carmen & Christian; Tanja & Willi; Alexander K. & Isabel	1; 2; 3; 4; 6; 10; 10	Discofox-Marathon	"Wovon Sollen Wir Träumen" — Frida Gold "Das kleine Küken piept" — Pulcino Pio "Barbie Girl" — Aqua "Timber" — Ke$ha "What Does the Fox Say" — Ylvis "I Sing A Liad Für Di" — Andreas Gaballier "Atemlos durch die Nacht" — Helene Fischer	

=== Week 5 ===
Running order

Couple	Score	Dance	Music	Result
Carmen & Christian; Alexander K. & Isabel; Larissa & Massimo	17 (6,7,4)	Fusion Dance _{(Rumba & Jive)}	"Let Her Go" — Passenger	
Lilly & Erich; Alexander L. & Oana; Tanja & Willi	17 (7,5,5)	Fusion Dance _{(Rumba & Jive)}	"Love Me Again" — John Newman	
Carmen & Christian	22 (8,8,6)	Waltz	"Three Times a Lady" — Stevie Wonder	Safe
Alexander K. & Isabel	29 (10,10,9)	Samba	"Balada" — Gusttavo Lima	Safe
Lilly & Erich	22 (8,8,6)	Foxtrot	"Isn't She Lovely" — Stevie Wonder	Safe
Alexander L. & Oana	13 (5,5,3)	Tango	"The Pink Panther Theme" — Henry Mancini	Eliminated
Larissa & Massimo	18 (7,7,4)	Waltz	"The Closest Thing to Crazy" — Katie Melua	Bottom Two
Tanja & Willi	26 (9,8,9)	Foxtrot	"Love Song" — Sara Bareilles	Safe

=== Week 6 "Movie Night" ===
Running order

Couple	Score	Dance	Music	Movie	Result
Tanja & Willi	21 (8,7,6)	Cha-Cha-Cha	"The Shoop Shoop Song" — Betty Everett	Mermaids	Safe
Tanja & Willi	29 (10,10,9)	Contemporary	"Rule the World" — Take That	Stardust	Safe
Lilly & Erich	24 (9,8,7)	Tango	"Assassin's Tango" — John Powell	Mr. & Mrs. Smith	Eliminated
Lilly & Erich	15 (6,6,3)	Samba	"It Had Better Be Tonight" — Henry Mancini	The Pink Panther	Eliminated
Carmen & Christian	17 (7,6,4)	Rumba	"Fallen"— Lauren Wood	Pretty Woman	Bottom Two
Carmen & Christian	20 (8,7,5)	Tango	"Perhaps, Perhaps, Perhaps" — The Pussycat Dolls	Brokeback Mountain	Bottom Two
Larissa & Massimo	23 (9,8,6)	Paso Doble	"Malagueña" — Ernesto Lecuona	Once Upon a Time in Mexico	Safe
Larissa & Massimo	21 (7,8,6)	Rumba	"All by Myself" — Eric Carmen	Bridget Jones's Diary	Safe
Alexander & Isabel	26 (10,9,7)	Tango	"On This Night of a Thousand Stars" — Madonna	Evita	Safe
Alexander & Isabel	23 (8,9,6)	Contemporary	"I See Fire" — Ed Sheeran	The Hobbit: The Desolation of Smaug	Safe

=== Week 7 ===
Running order

Couple	Score	Dance	Music	Result
Alexander & Isabel	23 (9,8,6)	Cha-Cha-Cha	"Treasure" — Bruno Mars	Safe
Alexander & Isabel	22 (8,8,6)	Freestyle	"Angels" — Robbie Williams	Safe
Carmen & Christian	19 (8,7,4)	Quickstep	"Diamonds Are a Girl's Best Friend" — Marilyn Monroe	Bottom Two
Carmen & Christian	17 (7,6,4)	Freestyle	"Unforgettable" — Nat King Cole	Bottom Two
Larissa & Massimo	22 (9,8,5)	Tango	"Dirty Diana"— Michael Jackson	Eliminated
Larissa & Massimo	23 (9,9,5)	Freestyle	"Sonnentanz" — Klangkarussell	Eliminated
Tanja & Willi	30 (10,10,10)	Waltz	"Run To You" — Whitney Houston	Safe
Tanja & Willi	23 (8,8,7)	Freestyle	"I Will Survive" — Gloria Gaynor	Safe

=== Week 8 ===
Running order

Couple	Score	Dance	Music	Result
Carmen & Christian	13 (6,5,2)	Samba	"Whenever, Wherever" — Shakira	Eliminated
Carmen & Christian	20 (8,8,4)	Contemporary	"Wicked Game" — Chris Isaak	Eliminated
Tanja & Willi	21 (8,7,6)	Tango	"Too Close" — Alex Clare	Bottom 2
Tanja & Willi	27 (9,9,9)	Paso Doble	"Frozen" — Madonna	Bottom 2
Alexander & Isabel	29 (10,10,9)	Waltz	"Stand by My Woman" — Lenny Kravitz	Safe
Alexander & Isabel	29 (10,10,9)	Paso Doble	"Song 2" — Blur	Safe
Carmen & Christian; Tanja & Willi; Alexander & Isabel	19 (7,7,5); 25 (8,9,8); 27 (9,9,9)	Cha-Cha-Cha (Dance-Off)	"Atemlos" — Helene Fischer	

=== Week 9 ===
Running order

Couple	Score	Dance	Music	Result
Tanja & Willi	20 (8,7,5)	Samba	"Dancing Queen" — ABBA	Runner-up
Tanja & Willi	29 (10,10,9)	Rumba	Liebe ist-Nena	Runner-up
Tanja & Willi	29 (10,10,9)	Freestyle	"Dancing in the Rain" — Ruth Lorenzo	Runner-up
Alexander & Isabel	27 (10,9,8)	Foxtrot	"You Are the Sunshine of My Life" — Stevie Wonder	Winner
Alexander & Isabel	30 (10,10,10)	Charleston	"Dick & Doof Theme" — Fred Strittmatter & Quirin Amper jr.	Winner
Alexander & Isabel	30 (10,10,10)	Freestyle	Dirty Dancing-Medley	Winner

=== Dance Chart ===
- Week 1: Cha-Cha-Cha, Waltz or Quickstep
- Week 2: Jive, Foxtrot or Contemporary
- Week 3: One unlearned dance (including Paso Doble and Rumba)
- Week 4: Bollywood, Charleston or Hip-Hop and Disco
- Week 5: One unlearned dance (including Tango and Samba) and Team Dance
- Week 6: Two unlearned dances
- Week 7: One unlearned dance and Freestyle
- Week 8: Two unlearned dances and Cha-Cha Dance-off
- Week 9: Final unlearned dance, Favorite dance and Freestyle

Couple	1	2	3	4		5		6		7		8			9		
Alexander K. & Isabel	Quickstep	Jive	Rumba	Charleston	Disco	Samba	Fusion Dance	Tango	Contemporary	Cha-Cha-Cha	Freestyle	Waltz	Paso Doble	Cha-Cha-Cha	Foxtrot	Charleston	Freestyle
Tanja & Willi	Quickstep	Jive	Rumba	Bollywood	Disco	Foxtrot	Fusion Dance	Cha-Cha-Cha	Contemporary	Waltz	Freestyle	Tango	Paso Doble	Cha-Cha-Cha	Samba	Rumba	Freestyle
Carmen & Christian	Cha-Cha-Cha	Foxtrot	Jive	Bollywood	Disco	Waltz	Fusion Dance	Rumba	Tango	Quickstep	Freestyle	Samba	Contemporary	Cha-Cha-Cha			
Larissa & Massimo	Cha-Cha-Cha	Contemporary	Quickstep	Bollywood	Disco	Waltz	Fusion Dance	Paso Doble	Rumba	Tango	Freestyle						
Lilly & Erich	Waltz	Jive	Cha-Cha-Cha	Charleston	Disco	Foxtrot	Fusion Dance	Tango	Samba								
Alexander L. & Oana	Waltz	Jive	Foxtrot	Hip-Hop	Disco	Tango	Fusion Dance										
Bernhard & Sarah	Cha-Cha-Cha	Foxtrot	Paso Doble	Charleston	Disco												
Dirk & Katja	Quickstep	Contemporary	Jive														
Cindy & Marius	Waltz	Contemporary															
Patrice & Ekaterina	Cha-Cha-Cha																

Highest scoring dance
Lowest scoring dance
Danced, but not scored
