= Susan Sideropoulos =

German actress and singer (born 1980)

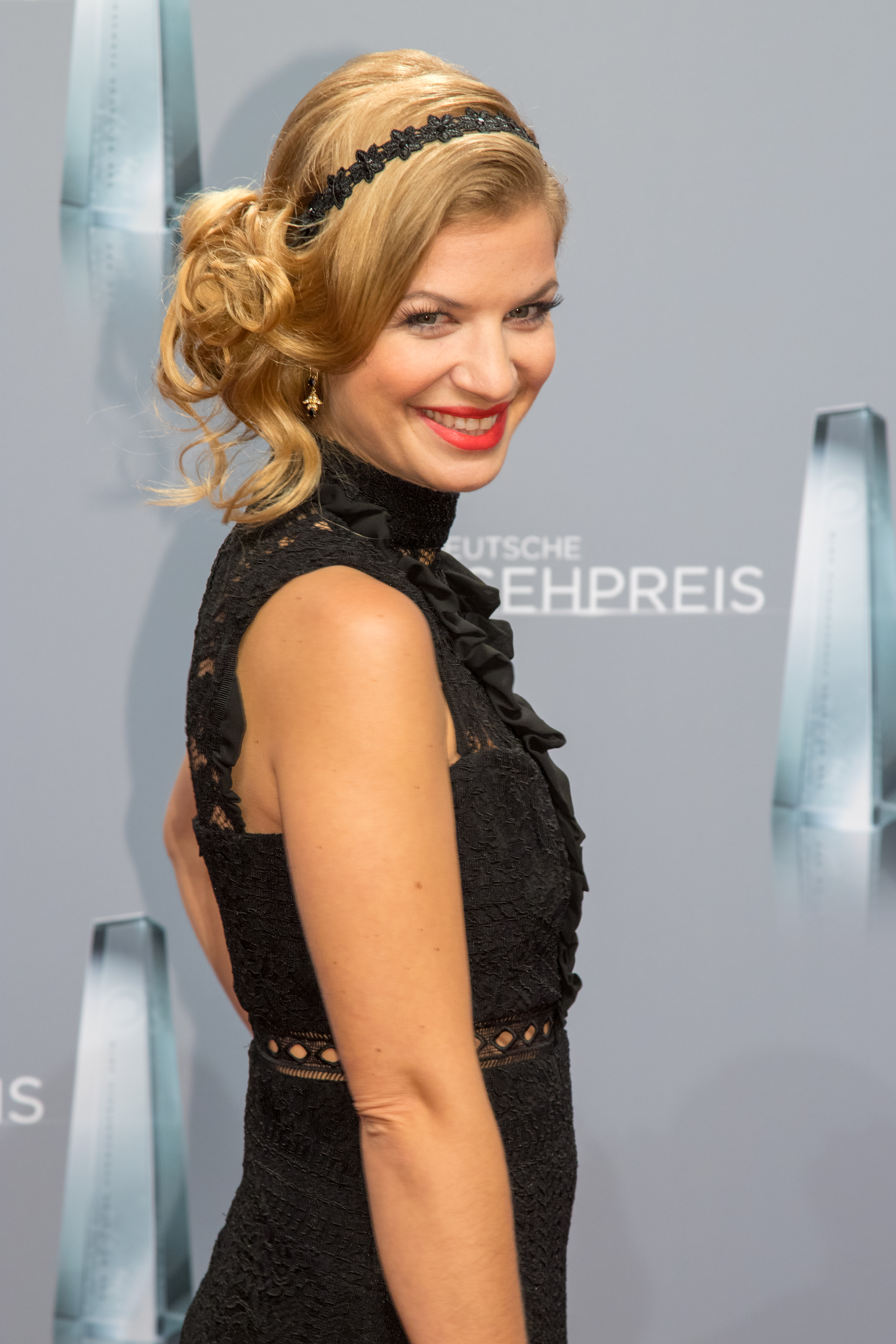
- Born: Susan Sideropoulos; 14 October 1980 (age 45); Hamburg, West Germany
- Years active: 2001–present
- Spouse: Jakob Shtizberg (2005–present)

Susan Sideropoulos (born 14 October 1980 in Hamburg) is a German actress and TV personality.

Her father is of Greek descent while her mother is from Israel.

Since 14 March 2002, Sideropoulos has been portraying the role of Verena Koch in the German soap opera Gute Zeiten, schlechte Zeiten.

She was the winner of Season 2 of the German series Let's Dance.

On 4 July 2019, She was revealed to be the Butterfly on the German adaptation of The Masked Singer.

== Filmography ==
| Year | Title | Role | Notes |
|---|---|---|---|
| 2001–2011 | Gute Zeiten, schlechte Zeiten | Verena Koch | 115 episodes |
| 2006 | Top of the Pops – German Version | Host | 5 episodes |
| 2006 | Hammer & Hart | Gina | |
| 2006 | Im Namen des Gesetzes | Nicole Wegmann | Episode: Wer hat, der hat |
| 2009 | Alarm für Cobra 11 – Die Autobahnpolizei | Claudia Wolters | Episode: Old Friends |
| 2013 | Küstenwache | Vanessa Gerlach | Episode: Herzfeuer |
| 2013 | Der Minister | Karin Breitmann | |
| 2019 | The Masked Singer | Butterfly | Eliminated in Episode 2 |

| Preceded by Wayne Carpendale & Isabel Edvardsson | Let's Dance winner Season 2 (2007 with Christian Polanc) | Succeeded by To be announced |
