= Jürgen Milski =

German television presenter

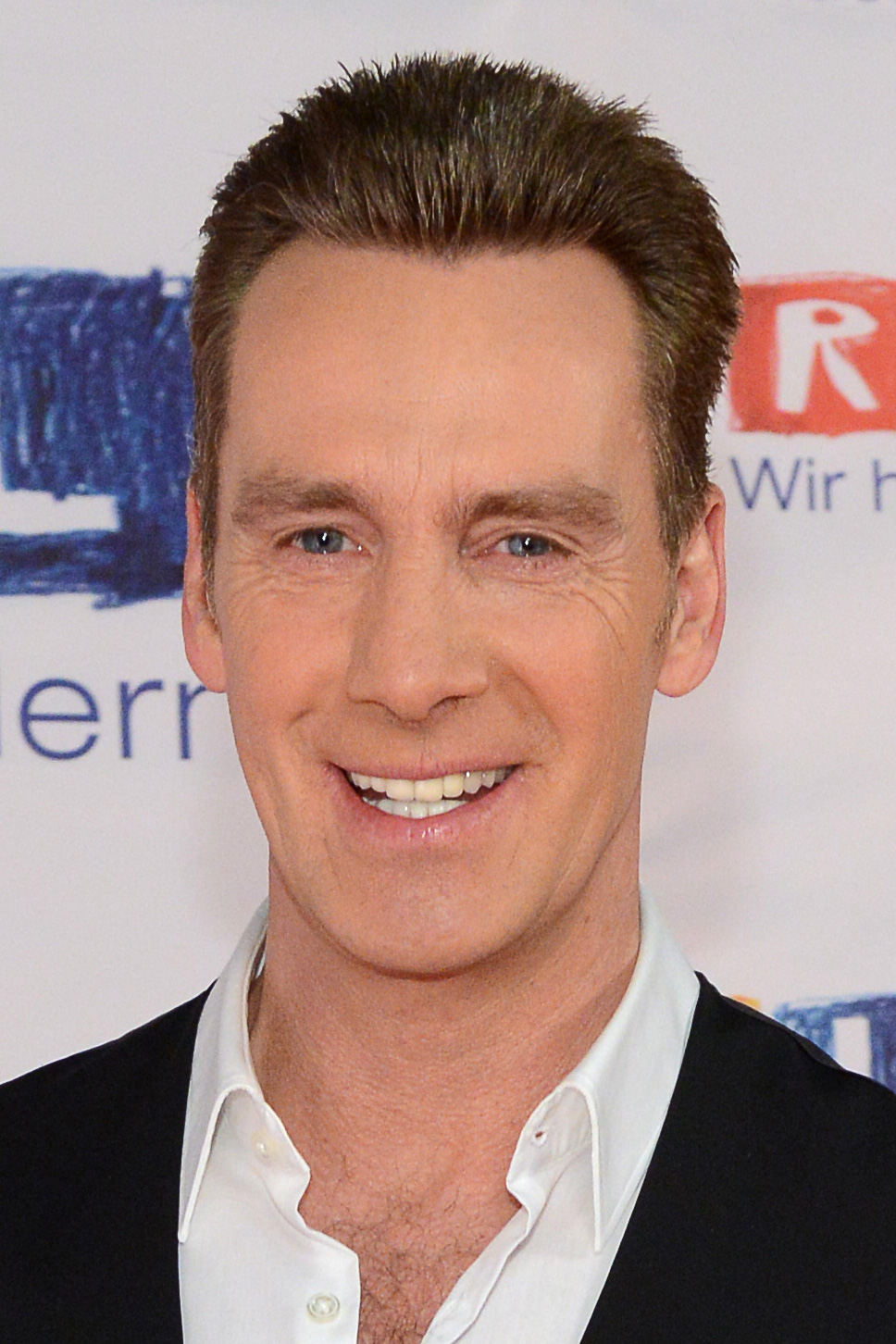
- Jürgen Milski (2015)
- Born: Jürgen Hans Milski; 24 November 1963 (age 62); Cologne, Germany
- Occupations: TV Presenter and Schlager Singer
- Years active: 2000-present
- Known for: Big Brother Germany
- Website: der-juergen.de

Jürgen Hans Milski (born 24 November 1963 in Cologne, Germany), known by his stage name BB Jürgen, is a German TV Presenter and Schlager Singer.

== Career ==
Milski initially worked as a sheet metal worker at Ford in Niehl, Cologne. In 2000, in the first German season of Big Brother, he became one of the audience favorites, finishing second, alongside Zlatko Trpkovski, whom he befriended during the show. Afterwards he recorded his first single Großer Bruder (Big Brother) with Trpkovski, which topped the German sales charts for several weeks with over 800,000 copies sold. He went on to make various television appearances and other music productions followed suit.

Since his Big Brother fame, Milski has made a living as a singer in Mallorca and as a carnival entertainer. In his book Ich sag’s, he gives an insight into his experiences with the television industry. From March 2005 to February 2016 he presented call-in competitions on 9Live and Sport1. In September 2005, he appeared in the celebrity special of the sixth season of Big Brother. From 2006 to 2015 he took part in several TV total specials such as the TV total Parallel Slalom and the TV total Wok World Championship. In the 2010 TV total Stock Car Crash Challenge, he took first place in the 3000cc class. In 2007 he worked alongside Charlotte Karlinder as an outside presenter for Big Brother on RTL II.

From July 2007 on he presented the program Das Schicksal meines Lebens (The Destiny of my Life) on RTL II together with Alida Kurras, the winner of the second German Big Brother season. Due to low ratings, the decision was made not to continue the format and the episodes that had already been filmed were relocated to a less relevant programming slot. His former employer Ford ended their collaboration as a sponsor in 2007. In the same month Milski started the band project Rühmanns Scherben together with Willi Herren and Libero5. From January to July 2008 he took part in the eighth German Big Brother season and co-hosted the weekly show Big Brother – Die Entscheidung on RTL II. Since 2012 he has presented the reality documentary Das ist das Leben! on RTL II, alternating with Kurras, and has presented the talent show Die Entertainer – Auf ins Rampenlicht on Super RTL since March 2012 with Anna-Maria Zimmermann.

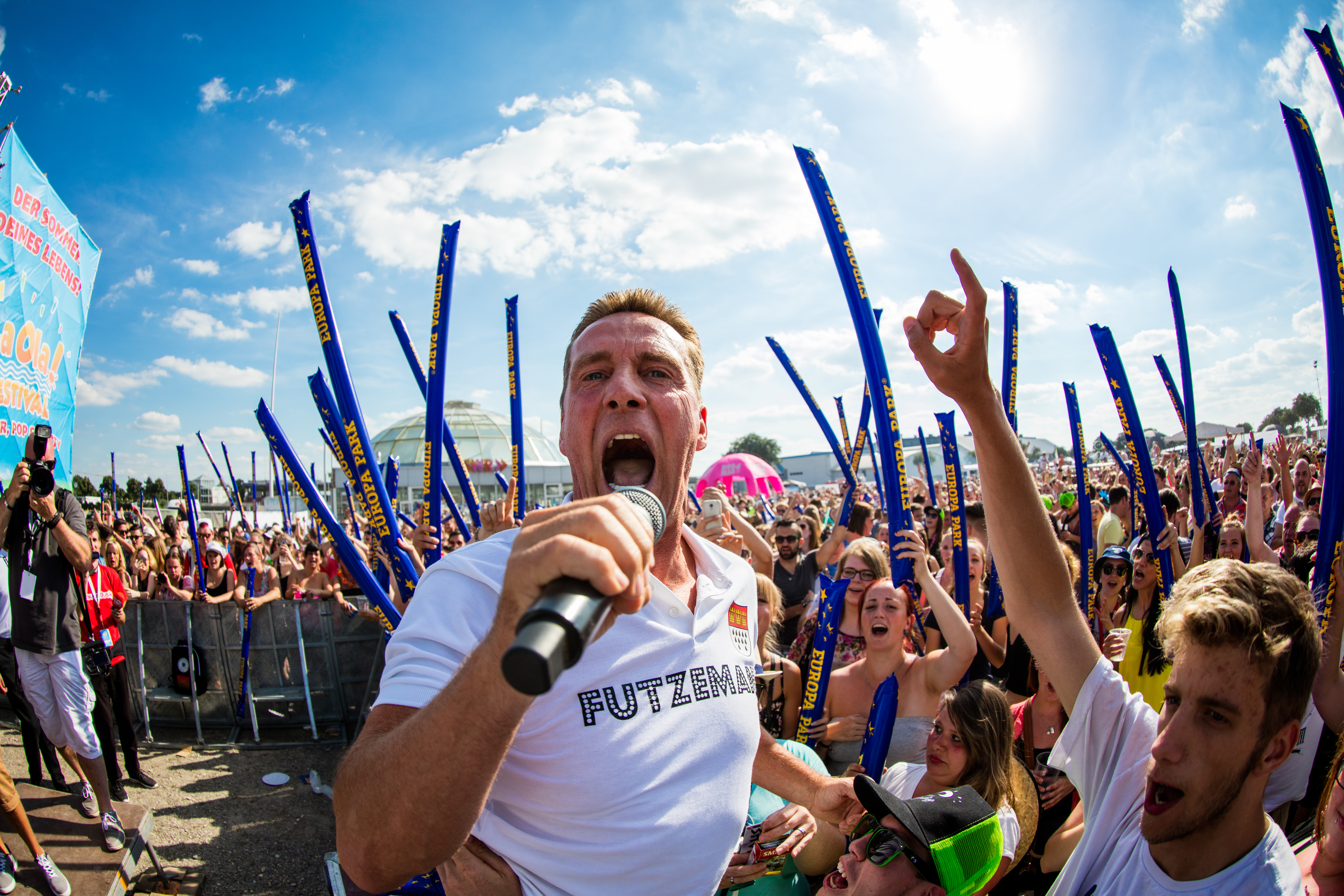
Jürgen Milski, 2016

From April to May 2013 he took part in the sixth season of Let's Dance; his professional dance partner was Oana Nechiti. The couple were eliminated in the fifth episode. In January 2016, he was a contestant on the German reality show Ich bin ein Star – Holt mich hier raus! (I'm a Celebrity - Get Me Out Of Here) on RTL and came fifth. In 2020 he took part in the reality shows Kampf der Realitystars – Schiffbruch am Traumstrand (Battle of the Reality Stars - Shipwreck on Dream Beach) and Die Festspiele der Reality Stars – Wer ist die hellste Kerze? (The Festival of Reality Stars - Who is the Brightest Candle?). He also lost to Sonja Zietlow in December 2020 on the ProSieben show Schlag den Star (Beat the Celebrity). In 2021, he took part in the RTL II program Das Supermarkt-Quiz together with Sandy Fähse. In 2022 he was a guest on Ich bin ein Star – Die Stunde danach (I'm a Celebrity - After-Hours) and Ich bin ein Star – Holt mich hier raus! Die große Dschungelparty (I'm a Celebrity - Get Me Out of Here! The Big Jungle Party). In November 2023, he took part in the eleventh season of Promi Big Brother.

Milski has a younger brother named Peter, who is six years younger than him, as well as another brother. He lives with his partner and their daughter in Cologne. In March 2026, Milski took part in Most Wanted – Wer entkommt?.

== Controversies ==
In November 2015, Milski came under criticism after posting statements on his Facebook page that linked migration with drug dealing in his hometown of Cologne, particularly around the Hohenzollern Bridge. In this context, Milski referred to drug dealers as "Dealerpack", which was described by some media outlets, particularly the Kölner Stadt-Anzeiger, as xenophobic statements.

In early 2021, he was again publicly criticized for comments he made on the television program Die letzte Instanz. Following a repeat broadcast on January 29, 2021, a controversy arose surrounding the eighth episode of the program, in which Milski and other guests, among other things, opposed the renaming of Zigeunersauce. The Central Council of German Sinti and Roma also expressed outrage in a press release over "anti-Gypsy statements". In December 2025, when asked about the 2021 program during a podcast, Milski stated that he would not apologize for his comments.

== Discography ==
Year	Name	Notes
2000	Grosser Bruder	
2000	Ich bin da	
2000	Volles Programm	Album
2001	Herz geballt	
2002	Auf Wiedersehen Holland – wir sind dabei	
2002	Wir sind wieder da (Finale Finale!)	
2002	Deutsche Mädels sind am Nesten	
2002	Geile Zeiten	feat. Neue Deutsche Welle
2003	So wie wir sehen Sieger aus	
2004	Immer gut gelaunt	
2004	Heute fährt die 18 bis nach Istanbul	also known as: Heute fährt die 18 bis zum Après Ski
2004	Natascha vorm Pascha	
2005	Der Lu-Lu-Lukas-Song	feat. Libero 5
2006	Der Schunkelsong	
2007	Ich weiß, was dir fehlt	Original: Peter Alexander & Kurt Edelhagen
2008	Wir ham’ St. Anton überlebt	feat. Mickie Krause
2008	Deutschland ist der geilste Club der Welt	(with Libero 5)
2008	Immer wenn ich traurig bin (trink ich einen Korn)	Original: Heinz Erhardt
2009	Von hinten Blondine (von vorne Ruine)	
2010	Wir sind wieder hier	
2010	Gletscherspalten	
2011	Ich mach ein glückliches Mädchen aus dir	Original: Chris Roberts
2011	Viva Mallorca	
2011	Wir sind Freunde fürs Leben	(with Libero 5)
2011	Du bist Super Plus	(with Die Ludolfs)
2011	Eurostrand macht happy	
2012	Wir fahren bis nach Polen (und wir werden Europameister)	(with Libero 5)
2012	Wo kenn ich dich her?	
2012	So schön wird’s nie wieder sein	
2012	Zu mir oder zu dir	feat. Stefan Stürmer
2013	Komm wir tanzen durch die Nacht!	
2013	Das hat die Welt noch nie gesehen	
2014	Unser Zelt auf Westerland	
2014	Du bist es vielleicht	(with Melanie Müller)
2014	Zwanzigvierzehn	(with Libero 5)
2014	Oh Helene	
2015	Magdalena	
2015	Es gibt nur eine Insel	
2015	Wenn Holland nicht wär	(with Libero 5)
2016	Dr. Bob	
2016	Es gibt nur einen Sieger	(with Libero 5)
2016	Der A Ram Sam Sam Song	Original: Traditional
2017	Ihr könnt mich alle alle alle	(with Deejay Biene)
2018	Wir schwören Mallorca die Treue	
2019	Wo geht die Party ab	
2020	Mallorcaverliebt	
2021	Siebener im Lotto	
2022	Weil wir Brüder sind	(with Peter Milski)
2023	Schon wieder	(with Peter Milski)
2023	Schwester Esther	(with Peter Milski)
2023	Ruderboot nach Mallorca	(with Peter Milski)
2024	Inselmodus	(with DJ Aaron)
2025	Steinschlagreparaturtermin	
2025	Hosenpause	(with DJ Cashi)
2026	Gib mir deine Nummer	Original: O-Zone – Dragostea din tei

== Literature ==
- Ich sag's. Verlag Kinzelbach, 2003, ISBN 3927069620.
