= Let's Dance (German TV series) season 6 =

Let's Dance
- Season 6
- Celebrity winner: Manuel Cortez
- Professional winner: Melissa Ortiz-Gomez
- No. of episodes: 9

Release
- Original network: RTL Television
- Original release: April 5 – May 31, 2013

Season chronology
- ← Previous; Season 5 Next → Season 7

The sixth season of Let's Dance began on 5 April 2013.Sylvie van der Vaart and Daniel Hartwich returned as hosts. Motsi Mabuse and Joachim Llambi returned as judges, while Jorge González replaced Maite Kelly and Roman Frieling.

== Couples ==
Celebrity	Occupation	Professional Partner	Status
Gülcan Kamps	Television presenter	Nikita Bazev	Eliminated 1st on April 6, 2013
Tetje Mierendorf	Comedian	Isabel Edvardsson	Eliminated 2nd on April 13, 2013
Marijke Amado	Television presenter	Stefano Terrazzino	Eliminated 3rd on April 20, 2013
Balian Buschbaum	Former pole vaulter	Sarah Latton	Eliminated 4th on April 27, 2013
Jürgen Milski	Musician	Oana Nechiti	Eliminated 5th on May 4, 2013
Manuela Wisbeck	Actress	Massimo Sinatò	Eliminated 6th on May 11, 2013
Simone Ballack	Michael Ballack's ex wife	Erich Klann	Eliminated 7th on May 18, 2013
Paul Janke	Football player, German Bachelor	Ekaterina Leonova	Third Place on May 25, 2013
Sıla Şahin	Actress	Christian Polanc	Runners-Up on May 31, 2013
Manuel Cortez	Actor	Melissa Ortiz-Gomez	Winners on May 31, 2013

=== Judges scores ===
Couple	Place	1	2	3	4	5	6	7	8	9
Manuel & Melissa	1	11	13	17	21+6=27	17+18=35	21+24=45	27+29=56	21+28+26=75	25+28+29=82
Sıla & Christian	2	13	22	21	28+8=36	21+17=38	21+25=46	21+28=49	23+30+24=77	24+29+29=82
Paul & Ekaterina	3	13	19	18	11+4=15	21+17=38	13+21=34	10+16=26	12+18+15=45	
Simone & Erich	4	15	8	9	12+2=14	14+17=31	10+11=21	14+13=27		
Manuela & Massimo	5	13	13	12	16+3=19	10+18=28	17+16=33			
Jürgen & Oana	6	6	12	13	17+10=27	8+18=26				
Balian & Sarah	7	17	15	11	13+1=14					
Marijke & Stefano	8	13	12	11						
Tetje & Isabel	9	10	10							
Gülcan & Nikita	10	10								

Red numbers indicates the lowest score for each week.
Green numbers indicates the highest score for each week.
indicates the couple eliminated that week.
indicates the returning couple that finished in the bottom two/three.
indicates the winning couple.
indicates the runner-up couple.
indicates the third-place couple.

== Weekly scores and songs ==
Unless indicated otherwise, individual judges scores in the charts below (given in parentheses) are listed in this order from left to right: Jorge Gonzalez, Motsi Mabuse and Joachim Llambi.

=== Week 1 ===
Running order

Couple	Score	Dance	Music	Result
Sıla & Christian	13 (6,4,3)	Cha-Cha-Cha	"Free" — Natalia Kills	Safe
Jürgen & Oana	6 (3,2,1)	Cha-Cha-Cha	"You're My Heart, You're My Soul" — Modern Talking	Bottom two
Balian & Sarah	17 (7,5,5)	Waltz	"If You Don't Know Me by Now" — Simply Red	Safe
Marijke & Stefano	13 (6,4,3)	Waltz	"What The World Needs Now" — Jackie DeShannon	Safe
Manuela & Massimo	13 (6,6,1)	Cha-Cha-Cha	"Think" — Aretha Franklin	Safe
Manuel & Melissa	11 (5,4,2)	Cha-Cha-Cha	"Troublemaker" — Olly Murs	Bottom three
Gülcan & Nikita	10 (4,4,2)	Cha-Cha-Cha	"Domino" — Jessie J	Eliminated
Simone & Erich	15 (6,5,4)	Waltz	"Open Arms" — Mariah Carey	Safe
Tetje & Isabel	10 (4,4,2)	Cha-Cha-Cha	"You Drive Me Crazy" — Shakin' Stevens	Safe
Paul & Ekaterina	13 (5,5,3)	Waltz	"The Rose" — Bette Midler	Safe

=== Week 2 ===
Running order

Couple	Score	Dance	Music	Result
Marijke & Stefano	12 (6,4,2)	Quickstep	"Mini Playback Show" theme	Safe
Simone & Erich	8 (4,3,1)	Rumba	"Listen To Your Heart" — Roxette	Bottom two
Jürgen & Oana	12 (5,4,3)	Quickstep	"Danger Zone" — Kenny Loggins	Bottom three
Tetje & Isabel	10 (4,4,2)	Rumba	"Always On My Mind" — Pet Shop Boys	Eliminated
Sıla & Christian	22 (8,7,7)	Rumba	"Diamonds" — Rihanna	Safe
Manuela & Massimo	13 (6,5,2)	Quickstep	"Time Warp" — from The Rocky Horror Picture Show	Safe
Manuel & Melissa	13 (6,5,2)	Rumba	"I Follow Rivers" — Triggerfinger	Safe
Paul & Ekaterina	19 (8,7,4)	Quickstep	"Drive By" — Train	Safe
Balian & Sarah	15 (6,6,3)	Rumba	"Try" — Pink	Safe

=== Week 3 ===
Running order

Couple	Score	Dance	Music	Result
Balian & Sarah	11 (4,4,3)	Jive	"Locked Out of Heaven" — Bruno Mars	Safe
Manuel & Melissa	17 (7,6,4)	Tango	"Libertango" — Ástor Piazzolla	Safe
Simone & Erich	9 (4,4,1)	Jive	"When the Rain Begins to Fall" — Jermaine Jackson & Pia Zadora	Bottom three
Marijke & Stefano	11 (6,3,2)	Tango	"Just a Gigolo" — Palast Orchester	Eliminated
Jürgen & Oana	13 (5,5,3)	Tango	"(I Just) Died in Your Arms" — Cutting Crew	Bottom two
Manuela & Massimo	12 (5,5,2)	Tango	"Move in the Right Direction" — Gossip	Safe
Paul & Ekaterina	18 (7,6,5)	Jive	"Gamblin' Man" — The Overtones	Safe
Sıla & Christian	21 (8,7,6)	Tango	"La Cumparsita" — Gerardo Matos Rodríguez	Safe

=== Week 4 ===
Running order

Couple	Score	Dance	Music	Result
Balian & Sarah	13 (5,5,3)	Paso Doble	"Burn It Down" — Linkin Park	Eliminated
Manuel & Melissa	21 (8,8,5)	Paso Doble	"The Plaza of Execution" — from The Mask of Zorro	Safe
Jürgen & Oana	17 (7,6,4)	Viennese Waltz	"It's a Man's, Man's, Man's World" — Seal & Michael Bolton	Safe
Paul & Ekaterina	11 (5,5,1)	Paso Doble	"Seven Nation Army" — White Stripes	Bottom three
Manuela & Massimo	16 (7,7,2)	Viennese Waltz	"Never Tear Us Apart" — Paloma Faith	Safe
Sıla & Christian	28 (10,10,8)	Viennese Waltz	"Hallelujah" — Rufus Wainwright	Safe
Simone & Erich	12 (5,5,2)	Paso Doble	"Free Your Mind" — En Vogue	Bottom two
Balian & Sarah; Simone & Erich; Manuela & Massimo; Paul & Ekaterina; Manuel & Melissa; Sıla & Christian; Jürgen & Oana	1; 2; 3; 4; 6; 8; 10	Discofox-Marathon	"Tacatà" — Tacabro "Welcome To St. Tropez" — DJ Antoine "Die Young" — Kesha "Call Me Maybe" — Carly Rae Jepsen "Schatzi schenk mir ein Foto" — Mickie Krause "Gangnam Style" — Psy "I Will Dance" — Lisa Aberer	

=== Week 5 ===
Running order

Couple	Score	Dance	Music	Result
Jürgen & Oana	8 (4,3,1)	Samba	"Kung Fu Fighting" — Carl Douglas	Eliminated
Manuel & Melissa	17 (7,6,4)	Foxtrot	"Dream a Little Dream of Me" — Mama Cass Elliot	Safe
Manuela & Massimo	10 (5,4,1)	Samba	"I Like to Move It" — Reel 2 Real	Bottom two
Simone & Erich	14 (6,5,3)	Foxtrot	"Frauen regier'n die Welt" — Roger Cicero	Safe
Sıla & Christian	21 (8,7,6)	Samba	"Kiss Kiss" — Tarkan	Safe
Paul & Ekaterina	21 (8,8,5)	Foxtrot	"Wire To Wire — Razorlight	Safe
Manuela & Massimo; Jürgen & Oana; Manuel& Melissa	18 (7,6,5)	Rumba & Jive	"Edge Of Glory" — Lady Gaga	
Sıla & Christian; Paul & Ekaterina; Simone & Erich	17 (7,6,4)	Rumba & Jive	"It's My Life" — Bon Jovi	

=== Week 6 "Movie Night" ===
Running order

Couple	Score	Dance	Music	Movie	Result
Sıla & Christian	21 (8,7,6)	Jive	"Maniac" — Michael Sembello	Flashdance	Safe
Sıla & Christian	25 (9,9,7)	Waltz	"My Love" — Sia	Twilight	Safe
Paul & Ekaterina	13 (5,5,3)	Rumba	"Skyfall" — Adele	Skyfall	Bottom two
Paul & Ekaterina	21 (8,8,5)	Viennese Waltz	"Kiss From A Rose" — Seal	Batman Forever	Bottom two
Manuel & Melissa	21 (8,8,5)	Viennese Waltz	"Have You Ever Really Loved A Woman?" — Bryan Adams	Don Juan DeMarco	Safe
Manuel & Melissa	24 (9,8,7)	Jive	"You Never Can Tell" — Chuck Berry	Pulp Fiction	Safe
Simone & Erich	10 (4,4,2)	Cha-Cha-Cha	"Oh, Pretty Woman" — Roy Orbison	Pretty Woman	Safe
Simone & Erich	11 (5,4,2)	Viennese Waltz	"You Don't Own Me" — Lesley Gore	The First Wives Club	Safe
Manuela & Massimo	17 (7,6,4)	Foxtrot	"Always Look on the Bright Side of Life" — Monty Python	Monty Python's Life of Brian	Eliminated
Manuela & Massimo	16 (6,7,3)	Paso Doble	"The Good, the Bad and the Ugly" — Ennio Morricone	The Good, the Bad and the Ugly	Eliminated

=== Week 7 "Magic Moments" ===
Running order

Couple	Score	Dance	Music	Result
Simone & Erich	14 (6,5,3)	Quickstep	"Walkin' Back to Happiness" — Helen Shapiro	Eliminated
Simone & Erich	13 (5,5,3)	Freestyle	"Smooth Operator" — Sade	Eliminated
Paul & Ekaterina	10 (4,4,2)	Cha-Cha-Cha	"Candy" — Robbie Williams	Bottom two
Paul & Ekaterina	16 (7,5,4)	Freestyle	"The Power of Love" — Jennifer Rush	Bottom two
Sıla & Christian	21 (8,7,6)	Foxtrot	"Big Spender" — Shirley Bassey	Safe
Sıla & Christian	28 (10,9,9)	Freestyle	"Run" — Leona Lewis	Safe
Manuel & Melissa	27 (10,9,8)	Quickstep	"Shooting Stars & Fairy Tales" — Mrs. Greenbird	Safe
Manuel & Melissa	29 (10,10,9)	Freestyle	"Smooth Criminal" — Michael Jackson	Safe

=== Week 8 ===
Running order

Couple	Score	Dance	Music	Result
Sıla & Christian	23 (9,8,6)	Quickstep	"Little Talks" - Of Monsters And Man	Safe
Sıla & Christian	30 (10,10,10)	Paso Doble	"Cancion Del Mariachi" - Los Lobos feat. Antonio Banderas	Safe
Paul & Ekaterina	12 (5,4,3)	Samba	"Love Is in the Air" - John Paul Young	Eliminated
Paul & Ekaterina	18 (7,7,4)	Tango	"Bang Bang (My Baby Shot Me Down)" - Nancy Sinatra	Eliminated
Manuel & Melissa	21 (8,7,6)	Samba	"Sexy Thing" - Hot Chocolate	Bottom two
Manuel & Melissa	28 (10,9,9)	Waltz	"Moon River" - Johnny Mercer	Bottom two
Sıla & Christian; Paul & Ekaterina; Manuel& Melissa	24 (9,8,7); 15 (6,5,4); 26 (9,9,8)	Cha-Cha-Cha (Dance-Off)	"Pata Pata" — Miriam Makeba	

=== Week 9 ===
Running order

Couple	Score	Dance	Music	Result
Sıla & Christian	24 (9,8,7)	Samba	"La Isla Bonita" — Madonna	Runner-up
Sıla & Christian	29 (10,10,9)	Viennese Waltz	"Hallelujah" — Leonard Cohen	Runner-up
Sıla & Christian	29 (10,10,9)	Freestyle	Titanic-Medley	Runner-up
Manuel & Melissa	25 (9,9,7)	Rumba	"I Just Can't Stop Loving You" — Michael Jackson	Winner
Manuel & Melissa	28 (10,9,9)	Jive	"You Never Can Tell" — Chuck Berry	Winner
Manuel & Melissa	29 (10,10,9)	Freestyle	Cabaret-Medley	Winner

- Viewers' votes: 50.06% for Manuel & Melissa, 49.94% for Sıla & Christian

== Dance Chart ==
- Week 1: Cha-Cha-Cha or Waltz
- Week 2: Rumba or Quickstep
- Week 3: Jive or Tango
- Week 4: Paso Doble or Viennese Waltz and Discofox Marathon
- Week 5: Samba or Foxtrot and Team Rumba/Jive Dance
- Week 6: Two unlearned dances
- Week 7: One unlearned dance and freestyle
- Week 8: Two unlearned dances and Cha-cha-cha dance-off
- Week 9: Judges' redemption dance, Couples' favorite dance and Freestyle

Couple	1	2	3	4		5		6		7		8			9		
Manuel & Melissa	Cha-Cha-Cha	Rumba	Tango	Paso Doble	Discofox	Foxtrot	Jive & Rumba	Viennese Waltz	Jive	Quickstep	Freestyle	Samba	Waltz	Cha-Cha-Cha	Rumba	Jive	Freestyle
Sıla & Christian	Cha-Cha-Cha	Rumba	Tango	Viennese Waltz	Discofox	Samba	Jive & Rumba	Jive	Waltz	Foxtrot	Freestyle	Quickstep	Paso Doble	Cha-Cha-Cha	Samba	Viennese Waltz	Freestyle
Paul & Ekaterina	Waltz	Quickstep	Jive	Paso Doble	Discofox	Foxtrot	Jive & Rumba	Rumba	Viennese Waltz	Cha-Cha-Cha	Freestyle	Samba	Tango	Cha-Cha-Cha			Foxtrot
Simone & Erich	Waltz	Rumba	Jive	Paso Doble	Discofox	Foxtrot	Jive & Rumba	Cha-Cha-Cha	Viennese Waltz	Quickstep	Freestyle						Foxtrot
Manuela & Massimo	Cha-Cha-Cha	Quickstep	Tango	Viennese Waltz	Discofox	Samba	Jive & Rumba	Foxtrot	Paso Doble								Paso Doble
Jürgen & Oana	Cha-Cha-Cha	Quickstep	Tango	Viennese Waltz	Discofox	Samba	Jive & Rumba										Viennese Waltz
Balian & Sarah	Waltz	Rumba	Jive	Paso Doble	Discofox												Rumba
Marijke & Stefano	Waltz	Quickstep	Tango														Tango
Tetje & Isabel	Cha-Cha-Cha	Rumba															Cha-cha-cha
Gülcan & Nikita	Cha-Cha-Cha																Cha-cha-cha

Highest scoring dance
Lowest scoring dance
Danced, but not scored
