= Let's Dance (German TV series) season 3 =

Let's Dance
- Season 3
- Celebrity winner: Sophia Thomalla
- Professional winner: Massimo Sinató
- No. of episodes: 8

Release
- Original network: RTL Television
- Original release: April 9 – May 28, 2010

Season chronology
- ← Previous; Season 2 Next → Season 4

The third season of Let's Dance began on 9 April 2010. After three years of pause, Nazan Eckes returned as host, while Daniel Hartwich replaced Hape Kerkeling. Joachim Llambi, forming the head judge in fact, was the only remaining judge from the first two seasons. Former professional participant Isabel Edvardsson as well as Peter Kraus and Harald Glööckler joined.

== Couples ==
Celebrity	Occupation	Professional Partner	Status
Arthur Abraham	Boxer	Nina Uszkureit	Withdrew on April 13, 2010
Mathieu Carrière	Actor	Tatjana Kuschill	Eliminated 2nd on April 16, 2010
Hillu Schwetje	Author	Christian Polanc	Withdrew on April 22, 2010
Achim Mentzel	Musician	Sarah Latton	Eliminated 3rd on April 23, 2010
Brigitte Nielsen	Actress	Oliver Tienken	Eliminated 4th on April 30, 2010
Rolf Scheider	Entertainer	Motsi Mabuse	Eliminated 5th on May 7, 2010
Raúl Richter	Actor	Melissa Ortiz-Gomez	Eliminated 6th on May 14, 2010
Nina Bott	Actress	Roberto Albanese	Third Place on May 21, 2010
Sylvie van der Vaart	Model	Christian Bärens (Week 1-6); Christian Polanc (Week 7-8)	Runners-Up on May 28, 2010
Sophia Thomalla	Actress	Massimo Sinato	Winners on May 28, 2010

== Judges scores ==
Couple	Place	1	2	3	4	5	6	7	8
Sophia & Massimo	1	23	28	28	29	33	31+36=67	40+35=75	39+37+39=115
Sylvie & Christian P / B	2	26	27	27	31	27	28+30=58	28+29=57	33+37+38=108
Nina & Roberto	3	27	25	26	26	27	26+25=51	27+29=56	
Raúl & Melissa	4	28	28	29	25	26	27+29=56		
Rolfe & Motsi	5	20	22	23	21	21			
Brigitte & Oliver	6	20	22	26	22				
Achim & Sarah	7	26	23	22					
Hillu & Christian P	8	24	--	--					
Mathieu & Tatjana	9	24	21						
Arthur & Nina	10	11							

Red numbers indicate the lowest score for each week.
Green numbers indicate the highest score for each week.
indicates the couple eliminated that week.
indicates the returning couple that finished in the bottom two.
indicates the couple was eliminated but later returned to the competition.
indicates the couple withdrew.
indicates the couple that did not dance due to physical injury.
indicates the winning couple.
indicates the runner-up couple.

== Weekly scores and songs ==
=== Week 1 ===
Individual judges scores in charts below (given in parentheses) are listed in this order from left to right: Harald Glööckler, Peter Kraus, Isabel Edvardsson, Joachim Llambi.

Running order

Couple	Score	Style	Music
Brigitte & Oliver	20 (8,5,5,2)	Salsa	"Let's Get Loud" - Jennifer Lopez
Rolf & Motsi	20 (6,6,6,2)	Waltz	"Für mich solls Rote Rosen regnen" - Trude Herr
Sophia & Massimo	23 (7,6,5,5)	Salsa	"Evacuate the Dancefloor" - Cascada
Mathieu & Tatjana	24 (9,7,5,3)	Waltz	"The Godfather Theme" - Nino Rota
Arthur & Nina	11 (4,3,3,1)	Salsa	"Beat It" - Michael Jackson
Hillu & Christian	24 (8,7,5,4)	Waltz	"See the Day" - All Saints
Raul & Melissa	28 (7,9,7,5)	Salsa	"Livin' la Vida Loca" - Ricky Martin
Nina & Roberto	27 (9,8,6,4)	Waltz	"You Are So Beautiful" - Joe Cocker
Achim & Sarah	26 (9,8,6,3)	Salsa	"Hamma!" - Culcha Candela
Sylvie & Christian	26 (9,8,6,3)	Waltz	"A Moment Like This" - Kelly Clarkson

=== Week 2 ===
Individual judges scores in charts below (given in parentheses) are listed in this order from left to right: Harald Glööckler, Peter Kraus, Isabel Edvardsson, Joachim Llambi.

Running order

Couple	Score	Style	Music
Nina & Roberto	25 (8,7,6,4)	West Coast Swing	"Get the Party Started" - P!nk
Mathieu & Tatjana	21 (7,6,5,3)	West Coast Swing	"I Just Want to Make Love to You" - Etta James
Sophia & Massimo	28 (8,8,7,5)	Jive	"Hey Ya!" - OutKast
Rolf & Motsi	22 (9,6,5,2)	West Coast Swing	"I Am What I Am" - Gloria Gaynor
Brigitte & Oliver	22 (8,7,4,3)	Jive	"Poker Face" - Lady Gaga
Achim & Sarah	23 (9,7,5,2)	Jive	"Schmittchen Schleicher" (Niko Haag)
Sylvie & Christian	27 (8,9,7,3)	West Coast Swing	"Heavy Cross" - Gossip
Raul & Melissa	28 (9,8,7,4)	Jive	"Dance With Somebody" - Mando Diao

=== Week 3 ===
Individual judges scores in charts below (given in parentheses) are listed in this order from left to right: Harald Glööckler, Peter Kraus, Isabel Edvardsson, Joachim Llambi.

Running order

Couple	Score	Style	Music
Achim & Sarah	22 (7,6,5,4)	Tango	"Hernando's Hideaway" - Alma Cogan
Nina & Roberto	26 (8,8,6,4)	Rumba	"Endless Love" - Lionel Richie
Brigitte & Oliver	26 (8,8,6,4)	Rumba	"Total Eclipse of the Heart" - Bonnie Tyler
Rolf & Motsi	23 (8,7,5,3)	Tango	"Kriminal Tango" - Hazy Osterwald
Sylvie & Christian	27 (7,9,7,4)	Rumba	"She's Like the Wind" - Patrick Swayze
Raul & Melissa	29 (9,7,7,6)	Rumba	"Lass es Liebe sein" - Rosenstolz
Sophia & Massimo	28 (8,9,5,6)	Tango	"Seven Nation Army" - The White Stripes

=== Week 4 ===
Individual judges scores in charts below (given in parentheses) are listed in this order from left to right: Harald Glööckler, Peter Kraus, Isabel Edvardsson, Joachim Llambi.

Running order

Couple	Score	Style	Music
Sophia & Massimo	29 (9,7,7,6)	Paso Doble	"Maneater" - Nelly Furtado
Nina & Roberto	26 (8,7,6,5)	Quickstep	"Valerie" - Amy Winehouse
Brigitte & Oliver	22 (8,6,5,3)	Paso Doble	"We Will Rock You" - Queen
Raul & Melissa	25 (9,8,6,2)	Quickstep	"Jungle Drum" - Emiliana Torrini
Sylvie & Christan	31 (9,9,7,6)	Paso Doble	"He's a Pirate" - Pirates of the Caribbean Soundtrack
Rolf & Motsi	21 (7,6,5,3)	Quickstep	"The Muppets" Theme

=== Week 5 ===
Individual judges scores in charts below (given in parentheses) are listed in this order from left to right: Harald Glööckler, Peter Kraus, Isabel Edvardsson, Joachim Llambi.

Running order

Couple	Score	Style	Music
Rolf & Motsi	21 (8,6,5,2)	Samba	"Tanze Samba mit mir" - Tony Holiday
Nina & Roberto	27 (8,7,7,5)	Samba	"If a Song Could Get Me You" - Marit Larsen
Sylvie & Christian	27 (9,8,6,4)	Samba	"Dancing Queen" - ABBA
Sophia & Massimo	33 (9,9,8,7)	Samba	"Hips Don't Lie" - Shakira & Wyclef Jean
Raul & Melissa	26 (7,9,7,3)	Samba	"Club Tropicana" - Wham!
Rolfe & Motsi; Raul & Melissa; Nina & Roberto; Sylvie & Christian; Sophia & Massimo	N/A	Rock'n'Roll	"Rock Around the Clock" - Bill Haley & His Comets "Jailhouse Rock" - Elvis Presley "Tutti Frutti" - Little Richard "Johnny B. Goode" - Chuck Berry "Great Balls of Fire" - Jerry Lee Lewis "Sugar Baby" - Peter Kraus

=== Week 6 ===
Individual judges scores in the chart below (given in parentheses) are listed in this order from left to right: Harald Glööckler, Peter Kraus, Isabel Edvardsson, Joachim Llambi.

Running order

Couple	Score	Style	Music
Sylvie & Christian	28 (9,7,7,5)	Jive	"SOS" — Rihanna
Sylvie & Christian	30 (9,8,8,5)	Salsa	"Tequila" — The Champs
Nina & Roberto	26 (7,7,7,5)	Salsa	"Bailamos" — Enrique Iglesias
Nina & Roberto	25 (7,7,7,4)	Jive	"Don't Stop Me Now" — Queen
Sophia & Massimo	31 (8,9,8,6)	Waltz	"All by Myself" — Eric Carmen
Sophia & Massimo	36 (10,10,8,8)	West Coast Swing	"Don't Cha" — Pussycat Dolls
Raul & Melissa	27 (8,7,7,5)	West Coast Swing	"I Like" — Keri Hilson
Raul & Melissa	29 (9,7,8,5)	Waltz	"Greatest Love of All" — Whitney Houston

=== Week 7 ===
Individual judges scores in the chart below (given in parentheses) are listed in this order from left to right: Harald Gloockler, Peter Klaus, Isabel Edvardsson, Joachim Llambi.

Running order

Couple	Score	Style	Music
Nina & Roberto	27 (9,7,7,4)	Tango	"I Kissed a Girl" — Katy Perry
Nina & Roberto	29 (9,8,7,5)	Paso Doble	"Star Wars Theme" — John Williams
Sylvie & Christian	28 (9,9,6,4)	Quickstep	"Fascination — Alphabeat
Sylvie & Christian	29 (9,8,6,6)	Tango	"Bad Romance" — Lady Gaga
Sophia & Massimo	40 (10,10,10,10)	Rumba	"Fields of Gold" — Sting
Sophia & Massimo	35 (9,9,9,8)	Quickstep	"Irgendwie, irgendwo, irgendwann" — Nena

=== Week 8 ===
Individual judges scores in the chart below (given in parentheses) are listed in this order from left to right: Harald Gloockler, Peter Klaus, Isabel Edvardsson, Joachim Llambi.

Running order

Couple	Score	Style	Music
Sylvie & Christian	33 (9,9,8,7)	Paso Doble	"He's a Pirate" — Pirates of the Caribbean Soundtrack
Sylvie & Christian	37 (10,10,9,8)	Salsa	"Tequila" — The Champs
Sylvie & Christian	38 (10,10,9,9)	Freestyle	Medley: "Feeling Good" — Michael Bublé "Fever" — Peggy Lee "You Can Leave Your Hat On" — Randy Newman "Unchain My Heart" — Ray Charles
Sophia & Massimo	39 (10,10,10,9)	Rumba	"Fields of Gold" — Sting
Sophia & Massimo	37 (10,10,9,8)	Samba	"Hips Don't Lie" — Shakira & Wyclef Jean
Sophia & Massimo	39 (10,10,10,9)	Freestyle	Michael Jackson-Medley: "Smooth Criminal" "Thriller" "Black or White"

=== Dance Chart ===
- Week 1: Salsa or Waltz
- Week 2: Jive or West Coast Swing
- Week 3: Rumba or Tango
- Week 4: Paso Doble or Quickstep
- Week 5: Samba & Group Rock'n'Roll
- Week 6: Two unlearned dances from Week 1 & 2
- Week 7: Two unlearned dances from Week 3 & 4 & Group Viennese Waltz
- Finals: Favourite Dance of the Season & Redemption Dance & Freestyle

Couple	1	2	3	4	5		6		7			8		
Sophia & Massimo	Salsa	Jive	Tango	Paso Doble	Samba	Rock'n'Roll	Waltz	West Coast Swing	Rumba	Quickstep	Viennese Waltz	Rumba	Samba	Freestyle
Sylvie & Christian P.; Christian B.	Waltz	West Coast Swing	Rumba	Paso Doble	Samba	Rock'n'Roll	Jive	Salsa	Quickstep	Tango	Viennese Waltz	Paso Doble	Salsa	Freestyle
Nina B. & Roberto	Waltz	West Coast Swing	Rumba	Quickstep	Samba	Rock'n'Roll	Salsa	Jive	Tango	Paso Doble	Viennese Waltz			
Raúl & Melissa	Salsa	Jive	Rumba	Quickstep	Samba	Rock'n'Roll	West Coast Swing	Waltz						
Rolfe & Motsi	Waltz	West Coast Swing	Tango	Quickstep	Samba	Rock'n'Roll								
Brigitte & Oliver	Salsa	Jive	Rumba	Paso Doble										
Achim & Sarah	Salsa	Jive	Tango											
Hillu & Christian P.	Waltz													
Mathieu & Tatjana	Waltz	West Cost Swing												
Arthur & Nina U.	Salsa													
