= Let's Dance (German TV series) season 5 =

Let's Dance
- Season 5
- Celebrity winner: Magdalena Brzeska
- Professional winner: Erich Klann
- No. of episodes: 11

Release
- Original network: RTL Television
- Original release: March 14 – May 23, 2012

Season chronology
- ← Previous; Season 4 Next → Season 6

The fifth season of Let's Dance began on 14 March 2012. Sylvie van der Vaart and Daniel Hartwich returned as hosts, while Joachim Llambi, Motsi Mabuse, and Roman Frieling all returned as judges. The jury Maite Kelly joined replacing Harald Glööckler.

This was Kelly's only season. Also Frieling did not return for season 6. In 2013, the winner Magdalena Breszka returned for the Christmas Special as one of the contestants.

== Couples ==
Celebrity	Occupation	Professional Partner	Status
Uwe Fahrenkrog-Petersen	Keyboard player	Helena Kaschurow	Eliminated 1st on March 14, 2012
Marc Terenzi	Singer	Sarah Latton	Eliminated 2nd on March 21, 2012
Patrick Bach	Actor	Melissa Ortiz-Gomez	Eliminated 3rd on March 28, 2012
Gitte Hænning	Singer	Gennady Bondarenko	Withdrew on April 10, 2012
Ardian Bujupi	Singer	Katja Kalugina	Eliminated 5th on April 11, 2012
Mandy Capristo	Singer	Stefano Terrazzino	Eliminated 6th on April 18, 2012
Patrick Lindner	Singer	Isabel Edvardsson	Eliminated 7th on April 25, 2012
Lars Riedel	Olympic athlete	Marta Arndt	Eliminated 8th on May 2, 2012
Joana Zimmer	Singer	Christian Polanc	Eliminated 9th on May 9, 2012
Stefanie Hertel	Singer	Sergiy Plyuta	Third Place on May 16, 2012
Rebecca Mir	Model	Massimo Sinató	Runners-Up on May 23, 2012
Magdalena Brzeska	Gymnast	Erich Klann	Winners on May 23, 2012

== Judges’ scores ==
Couple	Place	1	2	3	4	5	6	7	8	9	10	11
Magdalena & Erich	1	21	23	28	21	34	35	30+26=56	38+6=44	39+40=79	36+37=73	32+38+39=109
Rebecca & Massimo	2	26	32	19	21	33	33	26+24=50	33+8=41	33+34=67	35+38=73	34+38+37=109
Stefanie & Sergiy	3	22	27	17	28	27	24	30+26=56	27+10=37	28+30=58	27+32=59	
Joana & Christian	4	22	17	21	12	20	27	25+26=51	19+2=21	26+18=44		
Lars & Marta	5	14	15	11	12	22	8	10+24=34	16+4=20			
Patrick L. & Isabel	6	21	21	23	21	13	22	21+24=45				
Mandy & Stefano	7	21	28	22	30	25	19					
Ardian & Katja	8	15	19	19	27	22						
Gitte & Gennady	9	13	19	12	--	--						
Patrick B. & Melissa	10	18	20	16								
Marc & Sarah	11	22	16									
Uwe & Helena	12	9										

Red numbers indicates the lowest score for each week.
Green numbers indicates the highest score for each week.
indicates the couple eliminated that week.
indicates the returning couple that finished in the bottom two.
indicates the couple that didn't perform due to personal reasons.
indicates the couple that withdrew from the competition.
indicates the couple was eliminated but later returned to the competition.
indicates the winning couple.
indicates the runner-up couple.
indicates the third-place couple.

== Weekly scores and songs ==
=== Week 1 ===
Unless indicated otherwise, individual judges scores in the charts below (given in parentheses) are listed in this order from left to right: Roman Frieling, Maite Kelly, Motsi Mabuse, Joachim Llambi.

Running order

Couple	Score	Dance	Music
Mandy & Stefano	21 (5,7,5,4)	Cha-Cha-Cha	"I Wanna Dance with Somebody (Who Loves Me)" – Whitney Houston
Patrick & Melissa	18 (5,5,6,2)	Waltz	"Love Ain't Here Anymore" – Take That
Uwe & Helena	9 (2,3,3,1)	Cha-Cha-Cha	"You Spin Me Round (Like a Record)" – Danzel
Magdalena & Erich	21 (5,6,6,4)	Waltz	"(You Make Me Feel Like) A Natural Woman" – Aretha Franklin
Ardian & Katja	15 (5,4,4,2)	Cha-Cha-Cha	"Moves Like Jagger" – Maroon 5
Lars & Marta	14 (4,5,4,1)	Waltz	"Easy" – Commodores
Stefanie & Sergiy	22 (7,6,6,3)	Waltz	"Edelweiss" – The Sound of Music
Marc & Sarah	22 (6,6,6,4)	Cha-Cha-Cha	"Fuck You" – Cee Lo Green
Gitte & Gennady	13 (4,4,3,2)	Cha-Cha-Cha	"Girls Just Want to Have Fun" – Cyndi Lauper
Patrick & Isabel	21 (6,5,7,3)	Waltz	"What a Wonderful World" – Louis Armstrong
Rebecca & Massimo	26 (7,7,7,5)	Cha-Cha-Cha	"Tik Tok" – Kesha
Joana & Christian	22 (6,7,6,3)	Waltz	"Dark Waltz" – Hayley Westenra

==== Week 2 ====
Unless indicated otherwise, individual judges scores in the charts below (given in parentheses) are listed in this order from left to right: Roman Frieling, Maite Kelly, Motsi Mabuse, Joachim Llambi.

Running order

Couple	Score	Style	Music
Rebecca & Massimo	32 (8,8,8,8)	Salsa	"Ai se eu te pego!" – Michel Teló
Magdalena & Erich	23 (6,7,6,4)	Jive	"Sex on Fire" – Kings of Leon
Patrick & Melissa	20 (6,6,5,3)	Salsa	"Long Train Runnin" – The Doobie Brothers
Marc & Sarah	16 (5,5,4,2)	Quickstep	"Rebel Yell" – Billy Idol
Ardian & Katja	19 (5,6,5,3)	Rumba	"New Age" – Marlon Roudette
Patrick & Isabel	21 (5,6,6,4)	Rumba	"Sealed with a Kiss" – Bobby Vinton
Lars & Marta	15 (5,5,4,1)	Salsa	"Loco in Acapulco" – The Four Tops
Stefanie & Sergiy	27 (7,8,7,5)	Jive	"Footloose" – Kenny Loggins
Joana & Christian	17 (3,7,5,2)	Rumba	"Because of You" – Kelly Clarkson
Gitte & Gennady	19 (5,6,4,4)	Quickstep	"Mrs. Robinson" – Simon & Garfunkel
Mandy & Stefano	28 (7,8,7,6)	Rumba	"Mandy" – Barry Manilow

==== Week 3 ====
Unless indicated otherwise, individual judges scores in the charts below (given in parentheses) are listed in this order from left to right: Roman Frieling, Maite Kelly, Motsi Mabuse, Joachim Llambi.

Running order

Couple	Score	Style	Music
Ardian & Katja	19 (5,6,5,3)	Quickstep	"I Need a Dollar" – Aloe Blacc
Stefanie & Sergiy	17 (4,5,4,4)	Salsa	"Vamos A Bailar" – Paola e Chiara
Patrick & Isabel	23 (4,6,7,6)	Quickstep	"It's Not Unusual" – Tom Jones
Gitte & Gennady	12 (4,4,3,1)	Salsa	"Vayamos Companeros" – Marquess
Joana & Christian	21 (4,7,6,4)	Quickstep	"Nur ein Wort" – Wir sind Helden
Magdalena & Erich	28 (7,7,7,7)	Rumba	"Someone Like You" – Adele
Patrick & Melissa	16 (4,5,5,2)	Tango	"Tainted Love" – Soft Cell
Lars & Marta	11 (3,4,3,1)	Jive	"Holding Out for a Hero" – Bonnie Tyler
Mandy & Stefano	22 (5,8,6,3)	Argentine Tango	"El Tango de Roxanne" – Moulin Rouge!
Rebecca & Massimo	19 (5,5,6,3)	Viennese Waltz	"Cry Me Out" – Pixie Lott

==== Week 4: Dirty Dancing Week ====
Unless indicated otherwise, individual judges scores in the charts below (given in parentheses) are listed in this order from left to right: Roman Frieling, Maite Kelly, Motsi Mabuse, Joachim Llambi.

Running order

Couple	Score	Style	Music
Lars & Marta	12 (3,5,2,2)	Cha-Cha-Cha	"Love is Strange" – Mickey & Sylvia
Mandy & Stefano	30 (8,8,8,6)	Jive	"Yes" – Merry Clayton
Ardian & Katja	27 (7,8,7,5)	Salsa	"De Todo un Poco" – Ray Sepúlveda
Magdalena & Erich	21 (4,6,6,5)	Cha-Cha-Cha	"Big Girls Don't Cry" – The Four Seasons
Patrick & Isabel	21 (7,6,5,3)	Cha-Cha-Cha	"Hey Baby" – Bruce Channel
Rebecca & Massimo	21 (5,6,7,3)	Rumba	"Hungry Eyes" – Eric Carmen
Stefanie & Sergiy	28 (8,8,6,6)	Rumba	"She's Like the Wind" – Patrick Swayze
Joana & Christian	12 (2,5,4,1)	Cha-Cha-Cha	"Be My Baby" – The Ronettes

==== Week 5 ====
Unless indicated otherwise, individual judges scores in the charts below (given in parentheses) are listed in this order from left to right: Roman Frieling, Maite Kelly, Motsi Mabuse, Joachim Llambi.

Running order

Couple	Score	Style	Music
Stefanie & Sergiy	27 (7,8,7,5)	Tango	"Sway – Michael Bublé
Ardian & Katja	22 (6,6,6,4)	Samba	"Mas que Nada" – Jorge Ben
Lars & Marta	22 (7,7,5,3)	Foxtrot	"Love and Marriage" – Sammy Cahn & Jimmy Van Heusen
Mandy & Stefano	25 (4,8,8,5)	Paso Doble	"Rolling in the Deep" – Adele
Patrick & Isabel	13 (4,4,4,1)	Samba	"Volare – Gipsy Kings
Rebecca & Massimo	33 (8,10,9,6)	Paso Doble	"España cañí" – Pascual Marquina Narro
Joana & Christian	20 (7,6,5,2)	Foxtrot	"Close to you" – Jay Delano
Magdalena & Erich	34 (8,9,9,8)	Tango	"Por una Cabeza" – Carlos Gardel

==== Week 6: Personal Story Week ====
Unless indicated otherwise, individual judges scores in the charts below (given in parentheses) are listed in this order from left to right: Roman Frieling, Maite Kelly, Motsi Mabuse, Joachim Llambi.

Running order

Couple	Score	Style	Music
Stefanie & Sergiy	24 (7,6,6,5)	Freestyle	"Waterloo – ABBA
Mandy & Stefano	19 (5,4,6,4)	Freestyle	"Stand Up For Love" – Destiny's Child
Lars & Marta	8 (1,4,2,1)	Freestyle	"Eye of the Tiger" – Survivor
Patrick & Isabel	22 (6,7,7,2)	Freestyle	"Der Pariser Tango" – Mireille Mathieu
Magdalena & Erich	35 (7,10,9,9)	Freestyle	"One Moment in Time" – Whitney Houston
Joana & Christian	27 (7,8,7,5)	Freestyle	"When You Told Me How To Dance" – Katie Melua
Rebecca & Massimo	33 (10,9,8,6)	Freestyle	"S&M" – Rihanna

==== Week 7 ====
Unless indicated otherwise, individual judges scores in the charts below (given in parentheses) are listed in this order from left to right: Roman Frieling, Maite Kelly, Motsi Mabuse, Joachim Llambi.

Running order

Couple	Score	Style	Music
Magdalena & Erich	30 (7,8,8,7)	Samba	"Heart Skips a Beat" - Olly Murs featuring Rizzle Kicks
Joana & Christian	25 (6,8,6,5)	Paso Doble	"The Power" - Snap!
Rebecca & Massimo	26 (6,7,7,6)	Foxtrot	"Fever" - Peggy Lee
Lars & Marta	10 (1,6,2,1)	Samba	"Hot Hot Hot" - Arrow
Patrick & Isabel	21 (5,7,6,3)	Paso Doble	"Highway to Hell" - AC/DC
Stefanie & Sergiy	30 (8,10,8,4)	Viennese Waltz	"She's Always a Woman" - Billy Joel
Stefanie & Sergiy; Joana & Christian; Magdalena & Erich	26 (5,8,8,5)	Team Tango	"Dance with Me" - Debelah Morgan
Rebecca & Massimo; Lars & Marta; Patrick & Isabel	24 (7,7,5,5)	Team Jive	"Dance with Me Tonight" - Olly Murs

==== Week 8 ====
Unless indicated otherwise, individual judges scores in the charts below (given in parentheses) are listed in this order from left to right: Roman Frieling, Maite Kelly, Motsi Mabuse, Joachim Llambi.

Running order

Couple	Score	Style	Music
Stefanie & Sergiy	27 (8,8,7,4)	Samba	"Conga" - Gloria Estefan
Joana & Christian	19 (5,7,5,2)	Tango	"Somebody That I Used to Know" - Gotye feat. Kimbra
Magdalena & Erich	38 (10,10,9,9)	Quickstep	"Hey, Soul Sister" - Train
Lars & Marta	16 (6,7,2,1)	Tango	"The Phantom of the Opera" - Andrew Lloyd Webber
Rebecca & Massimo	33 (10,10,9,4)	Samba	"Crazy in Love" - Beyoncé Knowles
Joana & Christian; Lars & Marta; Magdalena & Erich; Rebecca & Massimo; Stefanie & Sergiy	2; 4; 6; 8; 10	Discofox-Marathon	"Daddy Cool - Boney M. "Dragostea din tei" - O-Zone "What Is Love" - Haddaway "Mr. Saxobeat" - Alexandra Stan" "Call on Me" - Eric Prydz

==== Week 9 ====
Unless indicated otherwise, individual judges scores in the charts below (given in parentheses) are listed in this order from left to right: Roman Frieling, Maite Kelly, Motsi Mabuse, Joachim Llambi.

Running order

Couple	Score	Style	Music
Joana & Christian	26 (8,8,6,4)	Viennese Waltz	"Breakaway" - Kelly Clarkson
Joana & Christian	18 (1,7,6,4)	Samba	"Sunny" - Boney M
Magdalena & Erich	39 (10,10,10,9)	Paso Doble	"Don't Let Me Be Misunderstood" - The Animals
Magdalena & Erich	40 (10,10,10,10)	Foxtrot	"Can't Take My Eyes Off You" - Frankie Valli
Stefanie & Sergiy	28 (7,8,7,6)	Quickstep	"Walking on Sunshine" - Katrina and the Waves
Stefanie & Sergiy	30 (7,9,8,6)	Paso Doble	"I Was Made for Lovin' You" - Kiss
Rebecca & Massimo	33 (9,9,8,7)	Jive	"Marry You" - Bruno Mars
Rebecca & Massimo	34 (9,10,9,6)	Waltz	"Angel" - Sarah McLachlan

==== Week 10 ====
Unless indicated otherwise, individual judges scores in the charts below (given in parentheses) are listed in this order from left to right: Roman Frieling, Maite Kelly, Motsi Mabuse, Joachim Llambi.

Running order

Couple	Score	Style	Music
Rebecca & Massimo	35 (9,10,9,7)	Quickstep	"Satellite - Lena Meyer-Landrut
Rebecca & Massimo	38 (10,10,9,9)	Argentine Tango	"Santa Maria" - Gotan Project
Stefanie & Sergiy	27 (6,8,8,5)	Cha-Cha-Cha	"Hot n Cold" - Katy Perry
Stefanie & Sergiy	32 (7,9,9,7)	Foxtrot	"I Say a Little Prayer" - Aretha Franklin
Magdalena & Erich	36 (9,10,9,8)	Salsa	"Danza Kuduro" - Don Omar featuring Lucenzo
Magdalena & Erich	37 (9,10,9,9)	Viennese Waltz	"When a Man Loves a Woman" - Michael Bolton

==== Week 11 ====
Unless indicated otherwise, individual judges scores in the charts below (given in parentheses) are listed in this order from left to right: Roman Frieling, Maite Kelly, Motsi Mabuse, Joachim Llambi.

Running order

Couple	Score	Style	Music
Rebecca & Massimo	34 (9,10,8,7)	Rumba	"I Will Always Love You" - Whitney Houston
Rebecca & Massimo	38 (10,10,9,9)	Salsa	"Ai se eu te pego!" – Michel Teló
Rebecca & Massimo	37 (10,9,9,9)	Freestyle	"Get Busy" - Sean Paul & "Waka Waka (This Time for Africa)" - Shakira
Magdalena & Erich	32 (7,9,9,7)	Cha-Cha-Cha	"Stronger" - Kelly Clarkson
Magdalena & Erich	38 (9,10,10,9)	Tango	"Por una Cabeza" - Carlos Gardel
Magdalena & Erich	39 (10,10,10,9)	Freestyle	"The Black Pearl" - Klaus Badelt

=== Dance Chart ===
- Week 1: Cha-Cha-Cha or Waltz
- Week 2: Rumba or Jive or Salsa or Quickstep
- Week 3: One unlearned dance from Week 2 or Tango or Viennese Waltz or Tango Argentino
- Week 4: One unlearned dance from Week 1-3 (Dirty Dancing Special)
- Week 5: Tango or Samba or Foxtrot or Paso Doble
- Week 6: One unlearned dance (Personal Story Week)
- Week 7: One unlearned dance & Team Dance
- Week 8: One unlearned dance & Discofox-Marathon
- Week 9: One unlearned Latin & ballroom dance
- Week 10: Two unlearned dances
- Week 11: Redemption dance, Favourite dance, Freestyle

Couple	1	2	3	4	5	6	7		8		9		10		11		
Magdalena & Erich	Waltz	Jive	Rumba	Cha-Cha-Cha	Tango	Freestyle	Samba	Tango	Quickstep	Discofox	Paso Doble	Foxtrot	Salsa	Viennese Waltz	Cha-Cha-Cha	Tango	Freestyle
Rebecca & Massimo	Cha-Cha-Cha	Salsa	Viennese Waltz	Rumba	Paso Doble	Freestyle	Foxtrot	Jive	Samba	Discofox	Jive	Waltz	Quickstep	Tango	Rumba	Salsa	Freestyle
Stefanie & Sergiy	Waltz	Jive	Salsa	Rumba	Tango	Freestyle	Viennese Waltz	Tango	Samba	Discofox	Quickstep	Paso Doble	Cha-Cha-Cha	Foxtrot			
Joana & Christian	Waltz	Rumba	Quickstep	Cha-Cha-Cha	Foxtrot	Freestyle	Paso Doble	Tango	Tango	Discofox	Viennese Waltz	Samba					
Lars & Marta	Waltz	Salsa	Jive	Cha-Cha-Cha	Foxtrot	Freestyle	Samba	Jive	Tango	Discofox							
Patrick & Isabel	Waltz	Rumba	Quickstep	Cha-Cha-Cha	Samba	Freestyle	Paso Doble	Jive									
Mandy & Stefano	Cha-Cha-Cha	Rumba	Tango	Jive	Paso Doble	Freestyle											
Ardian & Katja	Cha-Cha-Cha	Rumba	Quickstep	Salsa	Samba												
Gitte & Gennady	Cha-Cha-Cha	Quickstep	Salsa	--													
Patrick & Melissa	Waltz	Salsa	Tango														
Marc & Sarah	Cha-Cha-Cha	Quickstep															
Uwe & Helena	Cha-Cha-Cha																
