= Let's Dance (German TV series) season 2 =

Let's Dance
- Season 2
- Hosted by: Nazan Eckes; Hape Kerkeling
- Judges: Michael Hull; Ute Lemper; Joachim Llambi; Markus Schöffl
- Celebrity winner: Susan Sideropoulos
- Professional winner: Christian Polanc
- No. of episodes: 8

Release
- Original network: RTL Television
- Original release: May 14 – June 30, 2007

Season chronology
- ← Previous; Season 1 Next → Season 3

The second season of Let's Dance debuted on RTL Television on 14 May 2007. Nazan Eckes and Hape Kerkeling returned as the hosts, while Michael Hull, Joachim Llambi, and Markus Schöffl returned as judges. Ute Lemper joined the judging panel, replacing Katarina Witt.

On 30 June 2007, actress Susan Sideropoulos and Christian Polanc were announced as the winners, while singer Katja Ebstein and Oliver Seefeldt finished in second place, and footballer Giovane Élber and Isabel Edvardsson finished in third place.

== Couples ==
This season featured ten celebrity contestants.

Celebrity	Notability	Professional partner	Status
Jenny Elvers	Actress	Sascha Karabey	Eliminated 1st on May 12, 2007
Eralp Uzun	Actor	Anna Karina Mosmann	Eliminated 2nd on May 19, 2007
Margarethe Schreinemakers	Television host	Jürgen Schlegel	Eliminated 3rd on May 26, 2007
Markus Majowski	Actor	Anastasiya Kravchenko	Eliminated 4th on June 2, 2007
Guildo Horn	Singer	Motsi Mabuse	Eliminated 5th on June 9, 2007
Ben	Singer	Christine Deck	Eliminated 6th on June 16, 2007
Jasmin Wagner	Singer	Hendrik Höfken	Eliminated 7th on June 23, 2007
Giovane Élber	Footballer	Isabel Edvardsson	Third place on June 30, 2007
Katja Ebstein	Singer	Oliver Seefeldt	Runners-up on June 30, 2007
Susan Sideropoulos	Actress	Christian Polanc	Winners on June 30, 2007

== Scoring chart ==
The highest score each week is indicated in bold green with a dagger (†), while the lowest score each week is indicated in italicized red with a double-dagger (‡).

Color key:

Winners
Runners-up
Third place
Eliminated

Let's Dance (season 2) - Weekly scores
Couple	Pl.	Week							
Couple	Pl.	1	2	3	4	5	6	7	8
Susan & Christian	1st	22	17‡	**29**†	17	**29**†	29+33=62	31+38=**69**†	34+38=**72**† (Note: This couple finished in first place.)
Katja & Olivier	2nd	**28**†	22	26	17	23‡	22+24=46‡	30+32=62	32+30=62‡ (Note: This couple finished in second place.)
Giovane & Isabel	3rd	20	18	27	18	24	29+34=**63**†	27+27=54‡	28+35=63 (Note: This couple finished in third place.)
Jasmin & Hendrik	4th	16	23	28	28	23‡	24+30=54	34+32=66 (Note: This couple was eliminated.)	
Ben & Christine	5th	20	25	26	**30**†	27	31+29=60		
Guildo & Motsi	6th	18	**27**†	20‡	18	24			
Markus & Anastasiya	7th	20	22	25	16‡				
Margarethe & Jürgen	8th	15	19	20‡					
Eralp & Anna	9th	18	22						
Jenny & Sascha	10th	12‡							

== Weekly scores ==
Individual judges scores in charts below (given in parentheses) are listed in this order from left to right: Michael Hull, Ute Lemper, Markus Schöffl, Joachim Llambi.

=== Week 1 ===
Each couple performed either the cha-cha-cha or the waltz. Couples are listed in the order they performed.

Couple	Scores	Dance	Music
Susan & Christian	22 (3, 7, 7, 5)	Cha-cha-cha	"September" — Earth, Wind & Fire
Guildo & Motsi	18 (3, 6, 6, 3)	Waltz	"What The World Needs Now" — Jackie DeShannon
Ben & Christine	20 (4, 6, 6, 4)	Cha-cha-cha	"Ain't No Mountain High Enough" — Marvin Gaye
Jasmin & Hendrik	16 (2, 6, 6, 2)	Waltz	"Only One Road" — Céline Dion
Margarethe & Jürgen	15 (3, 4, 5, 3)	Cha-cha-cha	"Crazy" — Gnarls Barkley
Eralp & Anna	18 (5, 5, 6, 2)	Waltz	"Can You Feel the Love Tonight" — Elton John
Markus & Anastasiya	20 (6, 5, 5, 4)	Waltz	"The Voice Within" — Christina Aguilera
Jenny & Sascha	12 (2, 4, 4, 2)	Cha-cha-cha	"Lady" — Modjo
Katja & Oliver	28 (7, 9, 8, 4)	Waltz	"Run To You" — Whitney Houston
Giovane & Isabel	20 (6, 6, 5, 3)	Cha-cha-cha	"Daddy Cool" — Boney M.

=== Week 2 ===
Each couple performed either the quickstep or the rumba. Couples are listed in the order they performed.

Couple	Scores	Dance	Music
Eralp & Anna	22 (5, 7, 6, 4)	Rumba	"One" — U2
Margarethe & Jürgen	19 (4, 7, 5, 3)	Quickstep	"Walking On Sunshine" — Katrina and the Waves
Markus & Anastasiya	22 (5, 6, 7, 4)	Rumba	"Show Me Heaven" — Maria McKee
Giovane & Isabel	18 (5, 5, 5, 3)	Quickstep	
Jasmin & Hendrik	23 (6, 7, 7, 3)	Rumba	
Ben & Christine	25 (5, 8, 7, 5)	Quickstep	"Wonderwall" — Oasis
Susan & Christian	17 (4, 5, 6, 2)	Quickstep	"Just A Girl" — No Doubt
Guildo & Motsi	27 (7, 6, 8, 6)	Rumba	"Hungry Eyes" — Eric Carmen
Katja & Oliver	22 (6, 6, 6, 4)	Rumba	

=== Week 3 ===
Each couple performed either the jive or the tango. Couples are listed in the order they performed.

Couple	Scores	Dance	Music
Markus & Anastasiya	25 (7, 8, 7, 3)	Tango	"Por Una Cabeza" — Carlos Gardel
Susan & Christian	29 (7, 8, 8, 6)	Jive	"Yes" — Merry Clayton
Katja & Oliver	26 (8, 7, 7, 4)	Tango	"Sway — Michael Bublé
Ben & Christine	26 (7, 7, 7, 5)	Jive	"Love Really Hurts Without You" — Billy Ocean
Jasmin & Hendrik	28 (8, 7, 8, 5)	Tango	"Sweet Dreams (Are Made of This)" — Annie Lennox
Giovane & Isabel	27 (8, 7, 7, 5)	Jive	"She Loves You" — The Beatles
Margarethe & Jürgen	20 (6, 6, 6, 2)	Jive	"When the Rain Begins to Fall" — Jermaine Jackson
Guildo & Motsi	20 (5, 6, 6, 3)	Tango	"Shut Up" — The Black Eyed Peas

=== Week 4 ===
Each couple performed either the foxtrot or the paso doble. Couples are listed in the order they performed.

Couple	Scores	Dance	Music
Giovane & Isabel	18 (4, 5, 6, 3)	Foxtrot	"Love and Marriage" — Frank Sinatra
Katja & Oliver	17 (4, 5, 5, 3)	Paso doble	"Don't Let Me Be Misunderstood" — The Animals
Markus & Anastasiya	16 (3, 6, 5, 2)	Paso doble	"Rasputin" — Boney M
Guildo & Motsi	18 (3, 4, 7, 4)	Paso doble	"Eye of the Tiger" — Survivor
Susan & Christian	17 (2, 6, 6, 3)	Foxtrot	"I Wanna Be Loved by You" — Marilyn Monroe
Jasmin & Hendrik	28 (6, 8, 8, 6)	Paso doble	"Ain't It Funny" — Jennifer Lopez
Ben & Christine	30 (8, 9, 8, 5)	Foxtrot	"Fly Me to the Moon" — Frank Sinatra

=== Week 5 ===
Each couple performed the samba, as well as a group Viennese waltz. Couples are listed in the order they performed.

Couple	Scores	Dance	Music
Jasmin & Hendrik	23 (6, 6, 7, 4)	Samba	"I Love to Love" — Tina Charles
Katja & Oliver	23 (7, 7, 6, 3)	Samba	
Ben & Christine	27 (7, 8, 7, 5)	Samba	"Freedom" — George Michael
Guildo & Motsi	24 (7, 6, 6, 5)	Samba	"Shake Your Bon-Bon" — Ricky Martin
Susan & Christian	29 (8, 7, 8, 6)	Samba	"La Isla Bonita" — Madonna
Giovane & Isabel	24 (8, 7, 6, 3)	Samba	"Mas Que Nada" — The Black Eyed Peas

=== Week 6 ===
Each couple performed two unlearned dances. Couples are listed in the order they performed.

Couple	Scores	Dance	Music
Katja & Oliver	22 (5, 6, 7, 4)	Quickstep	"Sing, Sing, Sing" — Andrews Sisters
Katja & Oliver	24 (7, 7, 6, 4)	Cha-cha-cha	"Celebration" — Kool & the Gang
Giovane & Isabel	29 (7, 9, 7, 6)	Waltz	"I Belong to You (Il Ritmo della Passione)" — Eros Ramazzotti
Giovane & Isabel	34 (10, 8, 8, 8)	Rumba	"Fallen" — Lauren Wood
Jasmin & Hendrik	24 (4, 7, 8, 5)	Quickstep	"Pon de Replay" — Rihanna
Jasmin & Hendrik	30 (8, 8, 8, 6)	Cha-cha-cha	"Let's Get Loud" — Jennifer Lopez
Susan & Christian	29 (8, 8, 8, 5)	Waltz	"Morning Has Broken" — Cat Stevens
Susan & Christian	33 (9, 8, 10, 6)	Rumba	"Light My Fire" — Will Young
Ben & Christine	31 (9, 9, 9, 4)	Waltz	"When You Believe" — Whitney Houston
Ben & Christine	29 (7, 8, 8, 6)	Rumba	"How Deep Is Your Love" — Bee Gees

=== Week 7 ===
Each couple performed two unlearned dances. Couples are listed in the order they performed.

Couple	Scores	Dance	Music
Giovane & Isabel	27 (7, 8, 7, 5)	Tango	"Whatever Lola Wants" — Sarah Vaughan
Giovane & Isabel	27 (6, 8, 7, 6)	Paso doble	"Espana Cani"
Jasmin & Hendrik	34 (9, 9, 9, 7)	Foxtrot	"Close To You" — The Carpenters
Jasmin & Hendrik	32 (8, 8, 8, 8)	Jive	"Waterloo" — ABBA
Susan & Christian	31 (8, 9, 9, 5)	Tango	"Dance With Me" — Debelah Morgan
Susan & Christian	38 (10, 10, 10, 8)	Paso doble	"Left Outside Alone" — Anastacia
Katja & Oliver	30 (9, 9, 7, 5)	Foxtrot	"New York, New York" — Frank Sinatra
Katja & Oliver	32 (8, 10, 8, 6)	Jive	"Hit the Road Jack" — Ray Charles

=== Week 8 ===
Each couple performed three dances, one of which was their freestyle routine. Couples are listed in the order they performed.

Couple	Scores	Dance	Music
Susan & Christian	34 (9, 9, 9, 7)	Waltz	"Morning Has Broken" — Cat Stevens
Susan & Christian	38 (10, 9, 10, 9)	Paso doble	"Left Outside Alone" — Anastacia
Katja & Oliver	32 (10, 9, 9, 4)	Waltz	"Run To You" — Whitney Houston
Katja & Oliver	30 (7, 8, 9, 6)	Jive	"Hit the Road Jack" — Ray Charles
Giovane & Isabel	28 (7, 7, 8, 6)	Waltz	"I Belong to You (Il Ritmo della Passione)" — Eros Ramazzotti
Giovane & Isabel	35 (10, 8, 9, 8)	Rumba	"Fallen" — Lauren Wood

== Dance chart ==
The couples performed the following each week:

- Week 1: One unlearned dance (cha-cha-cha or waltz)
- Week 2: One unlearned dance (quickstep or rumba)
- Week 3: One unlearned dance (jive or tango)
- Week 4: One unlearned dance (foxtrot or paso doble)
- Week 5: Samba & Viennese waltz group dance
- Weeks 6—7: Two unlearned dances
- Week 8 (Finals): Favorite ballroom dance, favorite Latin dance & freestyle

Let's Dance (season 2) - Dance chart
Couple	Week												
Couple	1	2	3	4	5		6		7		8		
Susan & Christian	Cha-cha-cha	Quickstep	Rumba	Foxtrot	Samba	Group; Viennese waltz	Waltz	Rumba	Tango	Paso doble	Waltz	Paso doble	Freestyle
Katja & Oliver	Waltz	Rumba	Tango	Paso doble	Samba	Group; Viennese waltz	Quickstep	Cha-cha-cha	Foxtrot	Jive	Waltz	Jive	Freestyle
Giovane & Isabel	Cha-cha-cha	Quickstep	Jive	Foxtrot	Samba	Group; Viennese waltz	Waltz	Rumba	Tango	Paso doble	Waltz	Rumba	Freestyle
Jasmin & Hendrik	Waltz	Rumba	Tango	Paso doble	Samba	Group; Viennese waltz	Quickstep	Cha-cha-cha	Foxtrot	Jive			
Ben & Christine	Cha-cha-cha	Quickstep	Jive	Foxtrot	Samba	Group; Viennese waltz	Waltz	Rumba					
Guildo & Motsi	Waltz	Rumba	Tango	Paso doble	Samba	Group; Viennese waltz							
Markus & Anastasiya	Waltz	Rumba	Tango	Paso doble									
Margarethe & Jürgen	Cha-cha-cha	Quickstep	Jive										
Eralp & Anna	Waltz	Rumba											
Jenny & Sascha	Cha-cha-cha												
