= List of songs recorded by Modern Talking =

Modern Talking was a German pop duo who released twelve studio albums and twenty-three singles from 1984 to 2003. Some songs may be known by more than one title (like "Brother Louie" is known also as "No te pertenece" or "Brother Tuki").

== Songs ==
Key
| † | Indicates single release |
| # | Indicates song released as part of a soundtrack |
| ‡ | Indicates demo not officially released |

| Songs | Writers | Album | Year | Ref |
|---|---|---|---|---|
| "10 Seconds to Countdown" | Dieter Bohlen | Victory | 2002 | |
| "A Telegram to Your Heart" | Dieter Bohlen | In the Garden of Venus | 1987 | |
| "After Your Love is Gone" | Dieter Bohlen | Year of the Dragon | 2000 | |
| "All I Have" | Dieter Bohlen | Alone | 1999 | |
| "America" | Dieter Bohlen | America | 2001 | |
| "Angie's Heart" | Dieter Bohlen | Ready for Romance | 1986 | |
| "Anything is Possible" | Dieter Bohlen | Back for Good | 1998 | |
| "Arabian Gold" | Dieter Bohlen | Romantic Warriors | 1987 | |
| "Atlantis is Calling (S.O.S. for Love)" † | Dieter Bohlen | Ready for Romance | 1986 | |
| "Avec Toi" | Dieter Bohlen | Year of the Dragon | 2000 | |
| "Bells of Paris" | Dieter Bohlen | The 1st Album | 1985 | |
| "Blackbird" | Dieter Bohlen | Universe | 2003 | |
| "Blinded by Your Love" | Dieter Bohlen | Romantic Warriors | 1987 | |
| "Blue Eyed Coloured Girl" | Dieter Bohlen | Victory | 2002 | |
| "Brother Louie" † | Dieter Bohlen | Ready for Romance | 1986 | |
| "Can't Get Enough" | Dieter Bohlen | Alone | 1999 | |
| "Can't Let You Go" | Dieter Bohlen | Year of the Dragon | 2000 | |
| "Charlene" | Dieter Bohlen | Romantic Warriors | 1987 | |
| "Cheri, Cheri Lady" † | Dieter Bohlen | Let's Talk About Love | 1985 | |
| "China in Her Eyes" † | Dieter Bohlen | Year of the Dragon | 2000 | |
| "Christmas Lullaby" ‡ | — | — | 2002 | |
| "Cinderella Girl" | Dieter Bohlen | America | 2001 | |
| "Cosmic Girl" | Dieter Bohlen | Year of the Dragon | 2000 | |
| "Cry for You" | Thomas Anders; Christian Geller | Modern Talking Fan Club | 2001 | |
| "Cryin' in the Night" | Thomas Anders; Christian Geller | Modern Talking Fan Club | 2000 | |
| "Deeper" ‡ | Thomas Anders; Christian Geller | America | 2001 | |
| "Diamonds Never Made a Lady" | Dieter Bohlen | The 1st Album | 1985 | |
| "Do You Wanna" | Dieter Bohlen; Mary Applegate | The 1st Album | 1985 | |
| "Doctor for My Heart" | Dieter Bohlen | Ready for Romance | 1986 | |
| "Don't Give Up" | Dieter Bohlen | Let's Talk About Love | 1985 | |
| "Don't Let It Get You Down" | Dieter Bohlen | In the Garden of Venus | 1987 | |
| "Don't Let Me Down" | Dieter Bohlen | Alone | 1999 | |
| "Don't Let Me Go" | Dieter Bohlen | Alone | 1999 | |
| "Don't Lose My Number" | Dieter Bohlen | In the Garden of Venus | 1987 | |
| "Don't Make Me Blue" | Dieter Bohlen | Victory | 2002 | |
| "Don't Play With My Heart" | Dieter Bohlen | Back for Good | 1998 | |
| "Don't Take Away My Heart" † | Dieter Bohlen | Year of the Dragon | 2000 | |
| "Don't Worry" † | Dieter Bohlen | Romantic Warriors | 1987 | |
| "Down on My Knees" | Dieter Bohlen | B-side to "Juliet" | 2002 | |
| "Everybody Needs Somebody" | Dieter Bohlen | Universe | 2003 | |
| "Fight for the Right Love" | Dieter Bohlen | Year of the Dragon | 2000 | |
| "Fly to the Moon" | Dieter Bohlen | Year of the Dragon | 2000 | |
| "For a Life Time" | Dieter Bohlen | America | 2001 | |
| "For Always and Ever" | Thomas Anders | Alone | 1999 | |
| "From Coast to Coast" | Dieter Bohlen | America | 2001 | |
| "Geronimo's Cadillac" † | Dieter Bohlen | In the Middle of Nowhere | 1986 | |
| "Girl Out of My Dreams" | Dieter Bohlen | Year of the Dragon | 2000 | |
| "Give Me Peace on Earth" † | Dieter Bohlen | In the Middle of Nowhere | 1986 | |
| "Good Girls Go to Heaven - Bad Girls Go to Everywhere" | Dieter Bohlen | In the Garden of Venus | 1987 | |
| "Heart of an Angel" | Dieter Bohlen | Universe | 2003 | |
| "Heaven Will Know" | Dieter Bohlen | Let's Talk About Love | 1985 | |
| "Hey You" | Dieter Bohlen | Ready for Romance | 1986 | |
| "Higher Than Heaven" | Dieter Bohlen | Victory | 2002 | |
| "How You Mend a Broken Heart" | Dieter Bohlen | Alone | 1999 | |
| "I Can't Give You More" | Dieter Bohlen | Alone | 1999 | |
| "I Need You Now" | Thomas Anders | America | 2001 | |
| "I Will Follow You" | Dieter Bohlen | Back for Good | 1998 | |
| "I'll Never Fall in Love Again" | Dieter Bohlen | Year of the Dragon | 2000 | |
| "I'll Never Give You Up" | Thomas Anders | Alone | 1999 | |
| "I'm Gonna Be Strong" | Dieter Bohlen | Victory | 2002 | |
| "I'm No Rockefeller" | Dieter Bohlen | Universe | 2003 | |
| "I'm Not Guilty" | Dieter Bohlen | Year of the Dragon | 2000 | |
| "I'm So Much in Love" | Dieter Bohlen | Alone | 1999 | |
| "If I Can't Have You" | Barry Gibb; Robin Gibb; Maurice Gibb | Modern Talking Fan Club | 2001 | |
| "If I..." | Dieter Bohlen | Victory | 2002 | |
| "In 100 Years..." † | Dieter Bohlen | In the Garden of Venus | 1987 | |
| "In Shaire" | Dieter Bohlen | In the Middle of Nowhere | 1986 | |
| "It Hurts So Good" | Dieter Bohlen; Thomas Anders | Alone | 1999 | |
| "It's Christmas" | Dieter Bohlen | In the Garden of Venus | 1987 | |
| "It's Your Smile" | Dieter Bohlen | Year of the Dragon | 2000 | |
| "Jet Airliner" † | Dieter Bohlen | Romantic Warriors | 1987 | |
| "Juliet" † | Dieter Bohlen | Victory | 2002 | |
| "Just Close Your Eyes" | Dieter Bohlen | Alone | 1999 | |
| "Just Like an Angel" | Dieter Bohlen | Let's Talk About Love | 1985 | |
| "Just We Two (Mona Lisa)" | Dieter Bohlen | Ready for Romance | 1986 | |
| "Keep Love Alive" | Dieter Bohlen | Ready for Romance | 1986 | |
| "Knocking on My Door" | Dieter Bohlen | Universe | 2003 | |
| "Lady Lai" | Dieter Bohlen | Ready for Romance | 1986 | |
| "Last Exit to Brooklyn" † | Dieter Bohlen | America | 2001 | |
| "Let's Talk About Love" | Dieter Bohlen | Let's Talk About Love | 1985 | |
| "Life is Too Short" | Dieter Bohlen | Universe | 2003 | |
| "Like a Hero" | Dieter Bohlen | Romantic Warriors | 1987 | |
| "Locomotion Tango" | Dieter Bohlen | In the Garden of Venus | 1987 | |
| "Lonely Tears in Chinatown" † | Dieter Bohlen | In the Middle of Nowhere | 1986 | |
| "Love Don't Live Here Anymore" | Dieter Bohlen | Let's Talk About Love | 1985 | |
| "Love is Forever" | Thomas Anders | Year of the Dragon | 2000 | |
| "Love is Like a Rainbow" | Thomas Anders | Alone | 1999 | |
| "Love to Love You" | Thomas Anders | Victory | 2002 | |
| "Lucky Guy" | Dieter Bohlen | The 1st Album | 1985 | |
| "Maria" | Dieter Bohlen | America | 2001 | |
| "Mrs. Robota" | Dieter Bohlen | Victory | 2002 | |
| "My Declaration of Love" ‡ | Thomas Anders; Christian Geller | America | 2001 | |
| "My Lonely Girl" | Dieter Bohlen | Year of the Dragon | 2000 | |
| "Mystery" | Dieter Bohlen | Universe | 2003 | |
| "New York City Girl" | Dieter Bohlen | America | 2001 | |
| "No Face, No Name, No Number" | Dieter Bohlen | Year of the Dragon | 2000 | |
| "Nothing But the Truth" | Dieter Bohlen | Universe | 2003 | |
| "One in a Million" | Dieter Bohlen | The 1st Album | 1985 | |
| "Only Love Can Break My Heart" | Dieter Bohlen | Ready for Romance | 1986 | |
| "Operator Gimme 6-0-9" | Dieter Bohlen | Romantic Warriors | 1987 | |
| "Part Time Lover" | Dieter Bohlen | Year of the Dragon | 2000 | |
| "Princess of the Night" | Dieter Bohlen | In the Middle of Nowhere | 1986 | |
| "Rain in My Heart" | Dieter Bohlen | America | 2001 | |
| "Ready for the Victory" † | Dieter Bohlen | Victory | 2002 | |
| "Riding on a White Swan" | Dieter Bohlen | In the Middle of Nowhere | 1986 | |
| "Romantic Warriors" | Dieter Bohlen | Romantic Warriors | 1987 | |
| "Rouge et Noir" | Dieter Bohlen | Alone | 1999 | |
| "Run to You" | Dieter Bohlen | America | 2001 | |
| "Save Me - Don't Break Me" | Dieter Bohlen | Ready for Romance | 1986 | |
| "Send Me a Letter from Heaven" | Dieter Bohlen | America | 2001 | |
| "Sexy, Sexy Lover" † | Dieter Bohlen | Alone | 1999 | |
| "Shooting Star" # | Dieter Bohlen | Dieter: Der Film | 2006 | |
| "Should I, Would I, Could I" | Dieter Bohlen | Universe | 2003 | |
| "Slow Motion" | Dieter Bohlen | In the Garden of Venus | 1987 | |
| "SMS to My Heart" | Dieter Bohlen | America | 2001 | |
| "Space Mix '98" † | Dieter Bohlen | Alone | 1999 | |
| "Stranded in the Middle of Nowhere" | Dieter Bohlen | In the Middle of Nowhere | 1986 | |
| "Summer in December" | Dieter Bohlen | Victory | 2002 | |
| "Superstar" | Dieter Bohlen | Universe | 2003 | |
| "Sweet Little Sheila" | Dieter Bohlen | In the Middle of Nowhere | 1986 | |
| "Taxi Girl" | Dieter Bohlen | Alone | 1999 | |
| "Ten Thousand Lonely Drums" | Dieter Bohlen | In the Middle of Nowhere | 1986 | |
| "The Angels Sing in New York City" | Dieter Bohlen | In the Middle of Nowhere | 1986 | |
| "The Night is Yours - The Night is Mine" | Dieter Bohlen | The 1st Album | 1985 | |
| "There's Something in the Air" | Dieter Bohlen | America | 2001 | |
| "There's Too Much Blue in Missing You" | Dieter Bohlen | The 1st Album | 1985 | |
| "Time is on My Side" | Dieter Bohlen | Year of the Dragon | 2000 | |
| "TV Makes the Superstar" † | Dieter Bohlen | Universe | 2003 | |
| "Walking in the Rain of Paris" | Dieter Bohlen | Year of the Dragon | 2000 | |
| "We Are the Children of the World" | Dieter Bohlen | Victory | 2002 | |
| "We Still Have Dreams" | Dieter Bohlen | Romantic Warriors | 1987 | |
| "We Take the Chance" † | Dieter Bohlen | Back for Good | 1998 | |
| "When the Sky Rained Fire" | Dieter Bohlen | Victory | 2002 | |
| "Who Will Be There" | Dieter Bohlen | Universe | 2003 | |
| "Who Will Love You Like I Do" | Dieter Bohlen | Victory | 2002 | |
| "Who Will Save the World" | Dieter Bohlen | In the Garden of Venus | 1987 | |
| "Why Did You Do It Just Tonight" | Dieter Bohlen | Let's Talk About Love | 1985 | |
| "Why Does it Feel So Good" | Dieter Bohlen | America | 2001 | |
| "Wild Wild Water" | Dieter Bohlen | Let's Talk About Love | 1985 | |
| "Win the Race" † | Dieter Bohlen | America | 2001 | |
| "Witchqueen of Eldorado" | Dieter Bohlen | America | 2001 | |
| "With a Little Love" | Dieter Bohlen | Let's Talk About Love | 1985 | |
| "You and Me" | Dieter Bohlen | Romantic Warriors | 1987 | |
| "You Are Not Alone" † | Dieter Bohlen | Alone | 1999 | |
| "You Can Win If You Want" † | Dieter Bohlen | The 1st Album | 1985 | |
| "You're My Heart, You're My Soul" † | Dieter Bohlen | The 1st Album | 1985 | |
| "You're Not Lisa" | Dieter Bohlen | Victory | 2002 | |
| "You're The Lady of My Heart" | Dieter Bohlen | Let's Talk About Love | 1985 | |
