= Modern Talking discography =

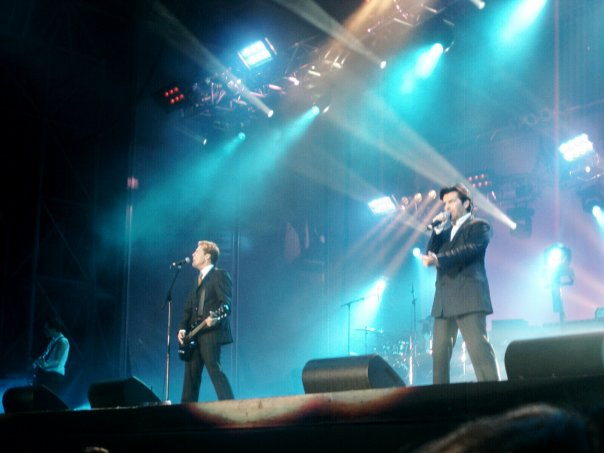
- Modern Talking during their final concert in 2003
- Studio albums: 12
- Compilation albums: 18
- Singles: 23 (all-time, no mixes/new versions)
- Video albums: 2

This is the discography of the German pop duo Modern Talking. The duo has released their material over two separate time periods—the first batch between 1984 and 1987, and then, after reuniting and making a successful comeback in 1998, between 1998 and 2003. Modern Talking's sound, however, was different after their reunion—they switched from their original 1980s mellow Europop sound to 1990s up-tempo Eurodance sound, which was in high demand in central Europe at the time.

Throughout their existence, Modern Talking have released 23 singles, 12 studio albums, 17 international compilation albums and two video albums.

Modern Talking's global sales, after the duo's second and final break-up in 2003, had reached 200 million singles and albums (+120 million) combined, making them the biggest-selling German music act in history.

== Albums ==
=== Studio albums ===
Title	Details	Peak chart positions										Certifications
Title	Details	GER	AUT	FIN	FRA	HUN	NLD	NOR	SPA	SWE	SWI	Certifications
The 1st Album	Released: 1 April 1985; Label: Hansa; Formats: CD, LP, cassette	1	2	1	—	—	9	5	5	12	2	BVMI: Platinum; PROMUSICAE: Gold
Let's Talk About Love	Released: 14 October 1985; Label: Hansa; Formats: CD, LP, cassette	2	4	2	—	—	16	3	3	4	1	BVMI: Platinum; PROMUSICAE: Gold
Ready for Romance	Released: 26 May 1986; Label: Hansa; Formats: CD, LP, cassette	1	1	3	19	—	7	5	4	6	1	BVMI: Platinum; PROMUSICAE: Platinum
In the Middle of Nowhere	Released: 10 November 1986; Label: Hansa; Formats: CD, LP, cassette	1	2	12	—	—	19	8	5	9	3	BVMI: Gold; PROMUSICAE: Platinum
Romantic Warriors	Released: 8 June 1987; Label: Hansa; Formats: CD, LP, cassette	3	6	7	—	—	35	10	9	15	8	PROMUSICAE: Platinum
In the Garden of Venus	Released: 30 November 1987; Label: Hansa; Formats: CD, LP, cassette	35	—	24	—	—	—	—	23	49	—	PROMUSICAE: Gold
Back for Good	Released: 30 March 1998; Label: Hansa; Formats: CD, cassette	1	1	1	2	1	3	1	6	1	1	BVMI: 5× Gold; IFPI FIN: Platinum; IFPI SWE: 2× Platinum; IFPI SWI: 2× Platinum; PROMUSICAE: Platinum; SNEP: Platinum
Alone	Released: 19 February 1999; Label: Hansa; Formats: CD, cassette	1	2	4	11	1	—	9	12	5	3	BVMI: Platinum; IFPI AUT: Gold; IFPI FIN: Gold; IFPI SWE: Platinum; IFPI SWI: Platinum; PROMUSICAE: Gold
Year of the Dragon	Released: 28 February 2000; Label: Hansa; Formats: CD, cassette	3	5	22	—	3	—	26	—	28	4	BVMI: Platinum; IFPI SWI: Gold
America	Released: 19 March 2001; Label: Hansa; Formats: CD, cassette	2	7	—	—	5	—	—	—	37	10	BVMI: Gold
Victory	Released: 18 March 2002; Label: Hansa; Formats: CD, cassette	1	7	—	—	10	—	—	—	—	14	BVMI: Gold
Universe	Released: 31 March 2003; Label: Hansa; Formats: CD, cassette	2	10	—	—	24	—	—	—	—	25	BVMI: Gold
"—" denotes a recording that did not chart or was not released in that territory.

=== Compilation albums ===
Title	Details	Peak chart positions				
Title	Details	GER	AUT	FIN	SPA	SWI
You're My Heart, You're My Soul	Released: 29 April 1988; Label: Ariola Express (Sony Music); Formats: CD, LP, cassette	—	—	—	—	—
The Modern Talking Story	Released: 1988; Label: Hansa (Ariola); Formats: CD, LP, cassette	—	—	29	—	—
Best of Modern Talking	Released: 1988; Label: Hansa (Ariola); Formats: CD, LP, cassette	16	—	—	—	—
Romantic Dreams	Released: 28 September 1988; Label: Ariola Express; Formats: CD, LP, cassette	—	—	—	—	—
Greatest Hits Mix	Released: 1988; Label: Hansa, Ariola; Formats: CD, LP, cassette	—	—	—	—	—
The Collection	Released: 1 July 1991; Label: Hansa; Formats: CD, LP, cassette	—	—	—	93	—
You Can Win If You Want (Star Collection)	Released: 1991; Label: Hansa; Formats: CD, LP, cassette	—	—	—	—	—
You Can Win If You Want	Released: 17 January 1994; Label: Ariola Express; Formats: CD, LP, cassette	—	—	—	—	—
Selected Singles '85–'98	Released: 2001; Label: Musicrama; Formats: CD, cassette	—	—	—	—	—
We Still Have Dreams – The Greatest Love Ballads of Modern Talking	Released: 2 September 2002; Label: Hansa; Formats: CD, cassette	—	—	—	—	—
The Golden Years (3 CDs)	Released: 9 September 2002; Label: Ariola Express; Formats: CD, cassette	—	—	—	—	—
The Greatest Hits of Modern Talking	Released: 2003; Label: Sony BMG Korea; Formats: CD, cassette	—	—	—	—	—
The Final Album	Released: 23 June 2003; Label: Hansa; Formats: CD, cassette	3	39	—	—	53
Les Indispensables	Released: 2006; Label: RCA; Formats: CD, cassette	—	—	—	—	—
The Hits	Released: 4 May 2007; Label: Ariola; Formats: CD, digital download	—	—	—	—	—
Remix Album	Released: 29 February 2008; Label: Hansa; Formats: CD, digital download	—	—	—	—	—
All the Best: The Definitive Collection (box set)	Released: 29 August 2009; Label: Ariola Express; Formats: CD, digital download	—	—	—	—	—
25 Years of Disco-Pop	Released: 22 January 2010; Label: SME Media; Formats: CD, digital download	16	10	—	—	—
The 80s Hit Box	Released: 27 August 2010; Label: Sony Music; Formats: CD	—	—	—	—	—
Peace on Earth (Winter in My Heart)	Released: 18 November 2011; Label: Hansa/Sony Music; Formats: CD, digital download	—	—	—	—	—
30 Years of Modern Talking (Das Neue Best of Album)	Released: 3 October 2014; Label: Sony Music Catalog; Formats: CD, digital download	12	58	—	—	49
Maxi and Singles Collection (Dieter Bohlen Edition)	Released: 6 December 2019; Label: Sony Music Catalog; Formats: CD, digital download	—	—	—	58	—
"—" denotes a recording that did not chart or was not released in that territory.

== Singles ==
Title	Year	Peak chart positions										Certifications	Album
Title	Year	GER	AUT	BEL (FL)	FRA	NLD	NOR	SPA	SWE	SWI	UK	Certifications	Album
"You're My Heart, You're My Soul"	1984	1	1	1	3	6	3	2	3	1	56	GER: Gold; FRA: Gold	The 1st Album
"You Can Win If You Want"	1985	1	1	2	8	7	—	2	—	2	70	GER: Gold; FRA: Gold	The 1st Album
"Cheri, Cheri Lady"	1985	1	1	3	18	8	1	1	3	1	—	GER: Gold; FRA: Silver	Let's Talk About Love
"Brother Louie"	1986	1	2	5	6	16	8	1	1	2	4	UK: Silver; FRA: Silver	Ready for Romance
"Atlantis Is Calling (S.O.S. for Love)"	1986	1	2	4	21	6	8	2	3	3	55		Ready for Romance
"Geronimo's Cadillac"	1986	3	3	4	43	24	7	1	6	6	—		In the Middle of Nowhere
"Give Me Peace on Earth"	1986	29	28	15	—	—	—	—	—	—	111		In the Middle of Nowhere
"Lonely Tears in Chinatown" (released in Spain only)	1987	—	—	—	—	—	—	9	—	—	—		In the Middle of Nowhere
"Jet Airliner"	1987	7	10	13	—	33	—	3	12	12	—		Romantic Warriors
"Don't Worry" (released in Spain only)	1987	—	—	—	—	—	—	25	—	—	—		Romantic Warriors
"In 100 Years..."	1987	30	—	—	—	—	—	4	—	—	—		In the Garden of Venus
"You're My Heart, You're My Soul '98"	1998	2	2	26	3	—	—	—	6	4	—	GER: Platinum; BEL: Gold; FRA: Gold	Back for Good
"Brother Louie '98"	1998	16	17	— (Note: "Brother Louie '98" peaked at number 7 on the Ultratip Flanders chart.)	2	51	—	2	9	21	—	FRA: Gold; SWE: Platinum	Back for Good
"Space Mix '98 / We Take the Chance"	1998	—	—	— (Note: "Space Mix '98" did not enter the Ultratop Flanders chart, but did peak at number 34 on the Wallonia chart.)	14	—	—	—	—	—	—		Back for Good
"You Are Not Alone"	1999	7	5	—	13	—	4	5	15	12	—	GER: Gold	Alone
"Sexy, Sexy Lover"	1999	15	27	—	—	—	—	19	25	35	—		Alone
"China in Her Eyes"	2000	8	22	—	—	—	—	6	26	20	—		Year of the Dragon
"Don't Take Away My Heart"	2000	41	—	—	—	—	—	—	—	—	—		Year of the Dragon
"Win the Race"	2001	5	14	—	—	—	—	—	36	31	—		America
"Last Exit to Brooklyn"	2001	37	44	—	—	—	—	—	—	94	—		America
"Ready for the Victory"	2002	7	20	—	—	—	—	11	—	62	—		Victory
"Juliet"	2002	25	42	— (Note: "Juliet" peaked at number 4 on the Ultratip Flanders chart.)	—	—	—	—	—	83	—		Victory
"TV Makes the Superstar"	2003	2	15	—	—	—	—	—	—	55	—		Universe
"—" denotes a recording that did not chart or was not released in that territory.
