= Ready for Romance =

1986 studio album by Modern Talking

Studio album by Modern Talking
- Released: 26 May 1986
- Recorded: November 1985 – February 1986
- Studio: Studio 33 (Hamburg)
- Genre: Eurodisco
- Length: 37:16
- Label: Hansa
- Producers: Dieter Bohlen; Luis Rodríguez

Modern Talking chronology
Let's Talk About Love (1985)	Ready for Romance (1986)	In the Middle of Nowhere (1986)

Singles from Ready for Romance
- 1. "Brother Louie" Released: 27 January 1986; 2. "Atlantis Is Calling (S.O.S. for Love)" Released: 28 April 1986

Ready for Romance is the third studio album by German duo Modern Talking, released on 26 May 1986 by Hansa Records. The album spent five consecutive weeks at the top of the German chart and was eventually certified platinum by the Bundesverband Musikindustrie (BVMI) for shipments in excess of 710,000 copies in Germany. It also topped the charts in Austria and Switzerland, while reaching the top 10 in Finland, the Netherlands, Norway, Spain and Sweden. It peaked at number 76 on the UK Albums Chart, becoming the band's only album to chart in the United Kingdom.

Two singles were released from Ready for Romance, "Brother Louie" and "Atlantis Is Calling (S.O.S. for Love)", both of which reached number one in Germany and charted within the top five in Austria, Sweden and Switzerland; "Brother Louie" also reached number 4 in the UK, their highest charting single there.

== Track listing ==
All tracks are written by Dieter Bohlen.

Side one
No.	Title	Length
1.	"Brother Louie"	3:41
2.	"Just We Two (Mona Lisa)"	3:54
3.	"Lady Lai"	4:55
4.	"Doctor for My Heart"	3:16
5.	"Save Me – Don't Break Me"	3:45

Side two
No.	Title	Length
6.	"Atlantis Is Calling (S.O.S. for Love)"	3:48
7.	"Keep Love Alive"	3:25
8.	"Hey You"	3:20
9.	"Angie's Heart"	3:37
10.	"Only Love Can Break My Heart"	3:35
Total length:		37:16

=== UK edition ===
Side one
No.	Title	Length
1.	"Brother Louie"	3:41
2.	"Just We Two (Mona Lisa)"	3:54
3.	"Lady Lai"	4:55
4.	"Doctor for My Heart"	3:16
5.	"Save Me – Don't Break Me"	3:45
6.	"Cheri, Cheri Lady"	3:45

Side two
No.	Title	Length
7.	"Atlantis Is Calling (S.O.S. for Love)"	3:48
8.	"Keep Love Alive"	3:25
9.	"Hey You"	3:20
10.	"Angie's Heart"	3:37
11.	"Only Love Can Break My Heart"	3:35
12.	"You're My Heart, You're My Soul"	5:36
Total length:		46:37

== Personnel ==
- Dieter Bohlen – guitar, production, arrangements, songwriter
- Thomas Anders – lead vocals
- Rolf Köhler – backing vocals, falsetto choir (uncredited)
- Michael Scholz – backing vocals, falsetto choir (uncredited)
- Detlef Wiedeke – backing vocals, falsetto choir (uncredited)
- Birger Corleis – backing vocals, falsetto choir (uncredited)
- Luis Rodriguez – co-producer, arrangements
- Ralf Stemmann – piano, keyboards, arrangements
- Manfred Vormstein – art direction, design, cover photo
- Matthias Kortemeier – design
- Didi Zill – artists photo

== Charts ==
=== Weekly charts ===
Weekly chart performance for Ready for Romance
Chart (1986)	Peak position
Austrian Albums (Ö3 Austria)	1
Dutch Albums (Album Top 100)	7
European Albums (Music & Media)	11
Finnish Albums (Suomen virallinen lista)	3
French Albums (IFOP)	19
German Albums (Offizielle Top 100)	1
Icelandic Albums (Tónlist)	6
Norwegian Albums (VG-lista)	5
Spanish Albums (AFYVE)	4
Swedish Albums (Sverigetopplistan)	6
Swiss Albums (Schweizer Hitparade)	1
UK Albums (Official Charts)	76

=== Year-end charts ===
Year-end chart performance for Ready for Romance
Chart (1986)	Position
Austrian Albums (Ö3 Austria)	8
Dutch Albums (Album Top 100)	45
European Albums (Music & Media)	32
German Albums (Offizielle Top 100)	13
Swiss Albums (Schweizer Hitparade)	20

== Certifications ==
Certifications for Ready for Romance
Region	Certification	Certified units/sales
Austria (IFPI Austria)	Gold	25,000^{*}
Belgium (BRMA)	Gold	25,000^{*}
Germany (BVMI)	Platinum	500,000^{^}
Hong Kong (IFPI Hong Kong)	Gold	10,000^{*}
Spain (Promusicae)	Platinum	100,000^{^}
^{*} Sales figures based on certification alone.^{^} Shipments figures based on certification alone.
