= America (Modern Talking album) =

Studio album by Modern Talking
- Released: 19 March 2001
- Genre: Eurodance
- Length: 63:48
- Label: Hansa
- Producers: Dieter Bohlen; Luis Rodríguez; Axel Breitung; Thorsten Brötzmann; Bülent Aris; Elephant

Modern Talking chronology
Year of the Dragon (2000)	America (2001)	Victory (2002)

Singles from America
- 1. "Win the Race" Released: 26 February 2001; 2. "Last Exit to Brooklyn" Released: 7 May 2001

Professional ratings
Review scores
Source	Rating
laut.de	2/5 stars

America is the tenth studio album by German duo Modern Talking, released on 19 March 2001 by Hansa Records. The album entered the German Albums Chart at number two on 2 April 2001, spending five weeks in the top 10 and 15 weeks altogether on chart.

== Track listing ==
All tracks are written by Dieter Bohlen, except "I Need You Now" by Thomas Anders.

No.	Title	Length
1.	"Win the Race"	3:35
2.	"Last Exit to Brooklyn"	3:16
3.	"Maria"	5:28
4.	"SMS to My Heart"	3:17
5.	"Cinderella Girl"	3:34
6.	"Why Does It Feel So Good"	4:05
7.	"Rain in My Heart"	3:47
8.	"Witchqueen of Eldorado"	3:55
9.	"Run to You"	4:47
10.	"America"	4:50
11.	"For a Life Time"	4:27
12.	"From Coast to Coast"	4:27
13.	"There's Something in the Air"	3:19
14.	"I Need You Now"	3:40
15.	"New York City Girl"	3:27
16.	"Send Me a Letter from Heaven"	3:54

== Personnel ==
- Dieter Bohlen – production
- Thomas Anders – lead vocals
- Axel Breitung – co-production, arrangements (tracks 1, 2, 4, 8)
- Thorsten Brötzmann – co-production, arrangements (tracks 6, 12)
- Luis Rodríguez – co-production (track 7)
- Bülent Aris – co-production, arrangements (track 10)
- Elephant – co-production, arrangements (tracks 13, 15, 16)
- Jeo – mixing (tracks 3, 5, 9, 11, 14)
- Lalo Titenkov – mixing, arrangements (tracks 3, 5, 9, 11, 14)
- Amadeo Crotti – arrangements (track 7)
- Wolfgang Wilde – photos
- Stefano Boragno – cover composing
- Ronald Reinsberg – artwork

== Charts ==
=== Weekly charts ===
Weekly chart performance for America
Chart (2001)	Peak position
Austrian Albums (Ö3 Austria)	7
Czech Albums (ČNS IFPI)	8
European Albums (Music & Media)	9
German Albums (Offizielle Top 100)	2
Hungarian Albums (MAHASZ)	5
Polish Albums (ZPAV)	19
Swedish Albums (Sverigetopplistan)	34
Swiss Albums (Schweizer Hitparade)	10

=== Year-end charts ===
Year-end chart performance for America
Chart (2001)	Position
German Albums (Offizielle Top 100)	28

== Certifications ==
Certifications for America
Region	Certification	Certified units/sales
Germany (BVMI)	Gold	150,000^{^}
^{^} Shipments figures based on certification alone.
