= Rosenzeit =

Studio album by Roy Black
- Released: 23 August 1991
- Recorded: 1991
- Studio: Studio 33 (Hamburg, Germany)
- Genre: Schlager
- Language: German
- Label: EastWest Records
- Producer: Dieter Bohlen; Luis Rodríguez

Roy Black chronology
Zeit für Zärtlichkeit (1990)	Rosenzeit (1991)

Rosenzeit is the last studio album by German singer and actor Roy Black. It was released on 23 August 1991 through EastWest Records, just a few months before Black's death of heart failure. The entire album was produced by Dieter Bohlen, with Luis Rodríguez acting as a co-producer.

== Background ==
Dieter Bohlen was first contacted by the managing director of EastWest Records, Jürgen Otterstein, who asked him if he could picture himself producing Roy Black. Initially, Bohlen refused vehemently, as he considered Black's music as "absolute commercial schmaltz, even for me". Two days after the call, Black visited Bohlen in the studio. During their conversation, Black discussed his life in details, which "moved" Bohlen. Bohlen described himself as having "never been so positively surprised by someone as [he was] by Roy". This meeting left Bohlen feeling that he was unable to refuse to produce Black, and they immediately "began trying some things out". A day later, Bohlen contacted Black and told him he would produce songs for his next album, but that he did not want an advance payment. Indeed, he felt that he would not earn any money from the record.

== Recording ==
Rosenzeit was recorded at the Studio 33 in Hamburg, Germany. Due to his other professional obligations, Black insisted that the recording take place in one day. As he had performed at a gala the previous day and had driven from Southern Germany to Hamburg, he was "exhausted" upon his arrival, and drank a lot of coffee. Bohlen insisted that Black rests before recording, which he initially refused but eventually accepted, and recording began in the early afternoon. Black's extensive drinking made him unable to remember the lyrics and melodies to the songs. As a result, Bohlen gave him a time lead and made him listen to the lyrics and melodies so that he could then sing what he was hearing, which Bohlen wrote "sounded surprisingly good" but made Black "strain himself excessively". The idea of making Black speak some parts of "Jeder braucht 'nen kleinen Flugplatz" instead of singing them came to Bohlen after witnessing that Black was too exhausted to continue following this method.

== Track listing ==
All tracks are written by Joachim Horn-Bernges and Dieter Bohlen and produced by Bohlen with Luis Rodríguez.

Rosenzeit
No.	Title	Length
1.	"Ich träume mich zu dir"	3:31
2.	"Frag Maria^{[a]}"	3:44
3.	"Rosenzeit"	3:10
4.	"Was soll ich oben ohne dich im Himmel?"	3:24
5.	"Jeder braucht 'nen kleinen Flugplatz"	3:29
6.	"Nie mehr verlier'n"	3:30
7.	"... Und troztdem, ich lieb' dich"	3:24
8.	"Morgen früh"	3:34
9.	"Ich kann mich nur wundern über dich"	3:26
10.	"Warum gerade du?^{[b]}"	3:15
11.	"Von Herz zu Herz"	3:38
12.	"Die Liebe sucht"	3:55

Notes

- ^{^a} "Frag Maria" uses the melody of "Lisa Said...", originally performed by Blue System in 1991.
- ^{^b} "Warum gerade du?" uses the melody of "When Sarah Smiles", originally performed by Blue System in 1990.

== Charts ==
Chart	Peak position
German Albums (Offizielle Top 100)	5
Austrian Albums (Ö3 Austria)	10
Swiss Albums (Schweizer Hitparade)	15

== Certifications ==
- Gold in 1991 in Germany
- Gold in 1991 in Austria
- Platinum in 1992 in Germany
