= Brother Louie =

Brother Louie may refer to:

- "Brother Louie" (Hot Chocolate song), 1973, notably covered by Stories
- "Brother Louie" (Modern Talking song), 1986
