= List of number-one singles of the 1980s (Switzerland) =

This is a list of singles that reached number one on the Swiss Hitparade during the 1980s.

== Number-one singles ==
Key
†	Number-one single of the year

Issue date	Song	Artist	Weeks at number one
1980
20 January	"I Have a Dream"	ABBA	2
3 February	"Another Brick in the Wall (Part II)"†	Pink Floyd	11
20 April	"Weekend"	Earth and Fire	1
27 April	"Boat on the River"	Styx	7
15 June	"Funkytown"	Lipps, Inc.	7
3 August	"Donna Musica"	Collage	5
7 September	"Upside Down"	Diana Ross	8
2 November	"Master Blaster (Jammin')"	Stevie Wonder	2
16 November	"Woman in Love"	Barbra Streisand	4
14 December	"Angel of Mine"	Frank Duval and Orchestra	5
1981
18 January	"(Just Like) Starting Over"	John Lennon	4
15 February	"Some Broken Hearts Never Mend"	Telly Savalas	2
1 March	"Life Is for Living"	Barclay James Harvest	4
29 March	"Fade to Grey"	Visage	2
12 April	"Shaddap You Face"	Joe Dolce Music Theatre	4
10 May	"In the Air Tonight"	Phil Collins	2
24 May	"Stars on 45"†	Stars on 45	6
5 July	"Bette Davis Eyes"	Kim Carnes	7
23 August	"Stars on 45 vol. 2"	Stars on 45	1
30 August	"Love What's Your Face"	Ingrid Kup	2
13 September	"Hold On Tight"	Electric Light Orchestra	3
4 October	"For Your Eyes Only"	Sheena Easton	3
25 October	"Japanese Boy"	Aneka	5
29 November	"Physical"	Olivia Newton-John	4
27 December	"Sharazan"	Al Bano and Romina Power	5
1982
31 January	"Cambodia"	Kim Wilde	2
14 February	"Rock'n' Roll Gypsy"	Helen Schneider	1
21 February	"Oh Julie"	Shakin' Stevens	5
28 March	"Skandal im Sperrbezirk"	Spider Murphy Gang	2
11 April	"I'll Find My Way Home"	Jon and Vangelis	3
2 May	"Ein bißchen Frieden"	Nicole	6
13 June	"Da da da ich lieb dich nicht du liebst mich nicht"	Trio	5
18 July	"Down Under"	Men at Work	4
15 August	"Abracadabra"	Steve Miller Band	6
26 September	"Hard to Say I'm Sorry"	Chicago	1
3 October	"I Know There's Something Going On"	Frida	2
17 October	"Words"†	F.R. David	6
28 November	"Come on Eileen"	Dexys Midnight Runners and The Emerald Express	2
12 December	"Do You Really Want to Hurt Me"	Culture Club	5
1983
16 January	"Pass the Dutchie"	Musical Youth	1
23 January	"Do You Really Want to Hurt Me"	Culture Club	1
30 January	"I Don't Wanna Dance"	Eddy Grant	2
13 February	"Major Tom (völlig losgelöst)"	Peter Schilling	5
20 March	"99 Luftballons"	Nena	2
3 April	"L'Italiano"	Toto Cutugno	2
17 April	"Billie Jean"	Michael Jackson	3
8 May	"Let's Dance"	David Bowie	2
22 May	"Bruttosozialprodukt"	Geier Sturzflug	4
19 June	"Juliet"	Robin Gibb	3
10 July	"Flashdance... What a Feeling"†	Irene Cara	4
7 August	"Moonlight Shadow"	Mike Oldfield	2
21 August	"Vamos a la playa"	Righeira	2
4 September	"Moonlight Shadow"	Mike Oldfield	2
18 September	"I Like Chopin"	Gazebo	4
16 October	"I'm Still Standing"	Elton John	2
30 October	"Karma Chameleon"	Culture Club	5
4 December	"Come Back and Stay"	Paul Young	5
1984
8 January	"? (Fragezeichen)"	Nena	3
29 January	"Jenseits von Eden"	Nino de Angelo	5
4 March	"Relax"	Frankie Goes to Hollywood	6
15 April	"Zu nah am Feuer"	Stefan Waggershausen and Alice	1
22 April	"Big in Japan"	Alphaville	4
20 May	"Hello"	Lionel Richie	5
24 June	"Self Control"†	Laura Branigan	1
1 July	"Self Control"	Raf	1
8 July	"Self Control"†	Laura Branigan	7
26 August	"Such a Shame"	Talk Talk	5
30 September	"Careless Whisper"	George Michael	4
28 October	"I Just Called to Say I Love You"	Stevie Wonder	4
25 November	"When the Rain Begins to Fall"	Jermaine Jackson and Pia Zadora	6
1985
6 January	"Do They Know It's Christmas?"	Band Aid	2
20 January	"One Night in Bangkok"	Murray Head	5
24 February	"Shout"	Tears for Fears	2
10 March	"You're My Heart, You're My Soul"	Modern Talking	5
14 April	"You Spin Me Round (Like a Record)"	Dead or Alive	3
5 May	"We Are the World"	USA for Africa	6
16 June	"19"	Paul Hardcastle	7
4 August	"We Don't Need Another Hero (Thunderdome)"	Tina Turner	6
15 September	"(I'll Never Be) Maria Magdalena"	Sandra	5
20 October	"Cheri, Cheri Lady"	Modern Talking	1
27 October	"(I'll Never Be) Maria Magdalena"	Sandra	1
3 November	"Cheri, Cheri Lady"	Modern Talking	1
10 November	"Take On Me"	a-ha	4
8 December	"Nikita"	Elton John	5
1986
12 January	"Say You, Say Me"	Lionel Richie	1
19 January	"Jeanny Part I"	Falco	9
23 March	"Burning Heart"	Survivor	1
30 March	"Ohne dich (schlaf ich heut Nacht nicht ein)"	Münchener Freiheit	4
27 April	"Adesso tu"†	Eros Ramazzotti	1
4 May	"Ohne dich (schlaf ich heut Nacht nicht ein)"	Münchener Freiheit	1
11 May	"Midnight Lady"	Chris Norman	5
15 June	"Touch Me (I Want Your Body)"	Samantha Fox	4
13 July	"Venus"	Bananarama	3
3 August	"Lessons in Love"	Level 42	8
28 September	"Holiday Rap"	MC Miker G & DJ Sven	1
5 October	"The Final Countdown"	Europe	7
23 November	"In the Army Now"	Status Quo	7
1987
11 January	"Showing Out (Get Fresh at the Weekend)"	Mel & Kim	4
8 February	"C'est La Vie"	Robbie Nevil	2
22 February	"Reality"	Richard Sanderson	6
5 April	"Respectable"	Mel & Kim	4
3 May	"Let It Be"	Ferry Aid	4
31 May	"La Isla Bonita"	Madonna	1
7 June	"Let It Be"	Ferry Aid	1
14 June	"I Wanna Dance with Somebody (Who Loves Me)"	Whitney Houston	6
26 July	"It's a Sin"	Pet Shop Boys	6
6 September	"La Bamba"	Los Lobos	1
13 September	"Boys (Summertime Love)"	Sabrina	5
18 October	"You Win Again"	Bee Gees	8
13 December	"Whenever You Need Somebody"	Rick Astley	1
20 December	"China in Your Hand"	T'Pau	5
1988
24 January	"Always on My Mind"	Pet Shop Boys	1
31 January	"Heaven Is a Place on Earth"	Belinda Carlisle	5
6 March	"House Arrest"	Krush	2
20 March	"Tell It to My Heart"	Taylor Dayne	4
17 April	"I Should Be So Lucky"	Kylie Minogue	1
24 April	"Tell It to My Heart"	Taylor Dayne	1
1 May	"I Should Be So Lucky"	Kylie Minogue	1
8 May	"Heart"	Pet Shop Boys	4
5 June	"Theme from S-Express"	S-Express	3
26 June	"Im Nin'Alu"	Ofra Haza	6
7 August	"The Twist"	Fat Boys with Stupid Def Vocals by Chubby Checker	6
18 September	"Hand in Hand"	Koreana	6
30 October	"A Groovy Kind of Love"	Phil Collins	6
11 December	"Orinoco Flow"	Enya	5
1989
15 January	"Bring Me Edelweiss"	Edelweiss	4
12 February	"First Time"	Robin Beck	1
19 February	"Bring Me Edelweiss"	Edelweiss	1
26 February	"First Time"	Robin Beck	1
5 March	"Something's Gotten Hold of My Heart"	Marc Almond featuring Gene Pitney	4
2 April	"Like a Prayer"	Madonna	4
30 April	"Looking for Freedom"†	David Hasselhoff	4
28 May	"The Look"	Roxette	8
23 July	"Express Yourself"	Madonna	1
30 July	"Batdance"	Prince	4
27 August	"Lambada"	Kaoma	14
3 December	"Girl I'm Gonna Miss You"	Milli Vanilli	9

== See also ==
- 1980s in music
