= Moving Heroes =

German pop rock band

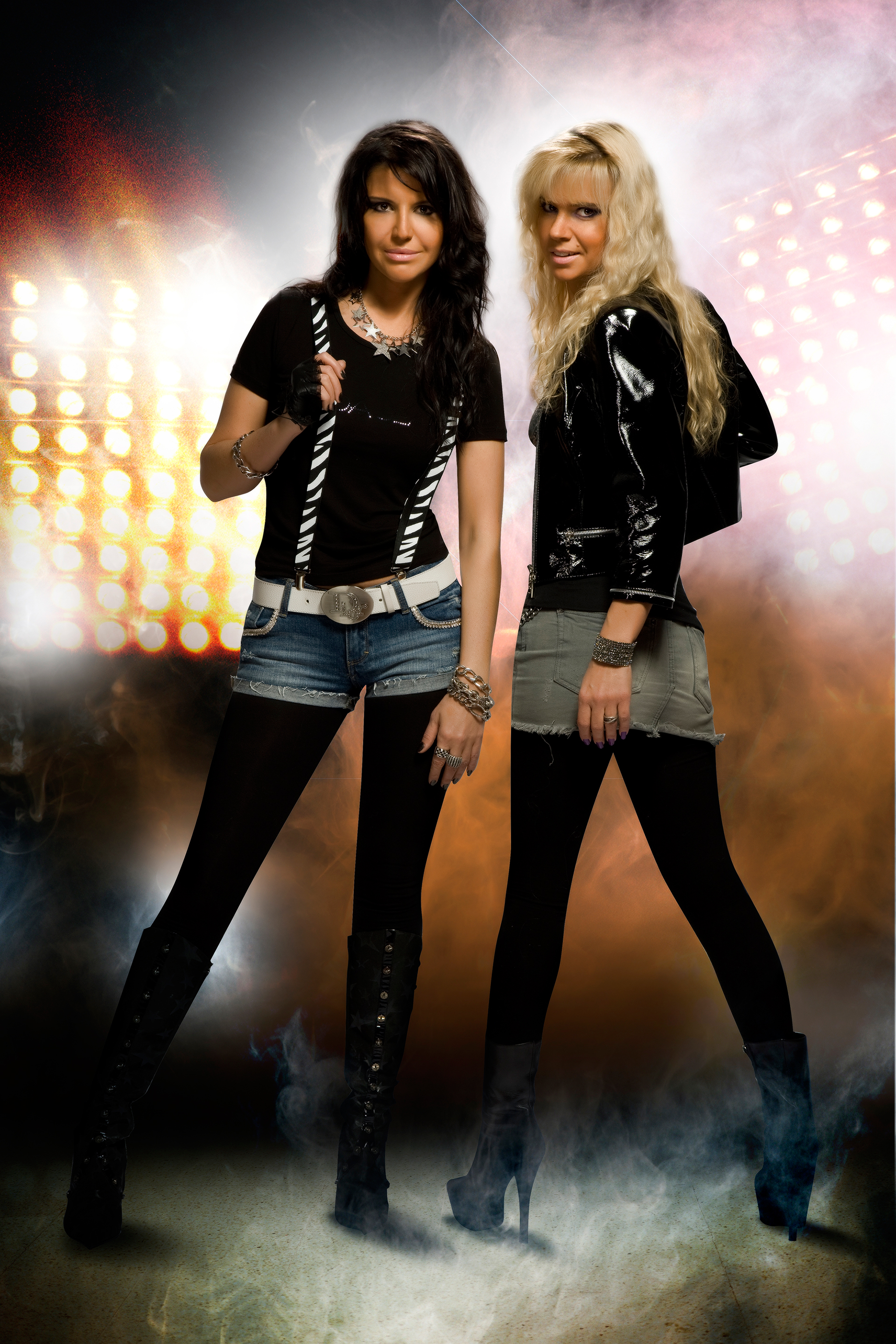

Background information
- Origin: Hamburg, Germany
- Genres: Pop rock
- Years active: 2007 – present
- Labels: Sony Music Entertainment
- Members: Elan Alden, Jenier Belous
- Website: www.moving-heroes.com

Moving Heroes – Crazy (Radio Edit)
Moving Heroes – Crazy (Radio Edit)

Moving Heroes is a Hamburg pop-rock group. Dieter Bohlen is the band's executive producer. Their debut album Golden Times went gold.

== History ==
The band was started by twelve-year-old cousins Elan and Jenier in 1998. All their songs are written by Jenier. In 2006, the group changed its name to Moving Heroes.

Their debut album, Golden Times, was released on June 1, 2007, and went gold. Two tracks, "You Are My Angel and My Devil" and "Not Good Enough," were released as singles.

Born to Win, their second album, was released on November 23, 2009, and went gold. The single "Crazy" from that album remains the group's biggest hit. The song "Life Is Hard" was also released as a single.

In 2010, the DVD Moving Heroes Presents was released, accompanied by a tour to promote the album.

== Members ==
Elan Alden – lead vocals
Jenier Belous – music, lyrics, back vocals

== Discography ==
CD

- 2007 Golden Times
- 2009 Crazy (Single)
- 2009 Born To Win
- 2010 Life Is Hard (Single)
- 2012 Danger! Angel... (Single)
- 2014 Shadow (Single)
- 2015 Dirty Dancing (Single)

DVD

- 2010 Moving Heroes TV Presents
- 2013 Concert at Ice Palace Arena Live 27.10.2011

Digital

- 2011 Angel's Dream (Single)
- 2011 Dangerous And Real (Single)
- 2018 Dirty Dancing (Single)

== Videography ==
- 2007 You Are My Angel And My Devil
- 2009 Crazy
- 2009 Crazy Remake
- 2009 You Are My Angel And My Devil New Version
- 2010 Life Is Hard
- 2010 Country Of The Sun
- 2011 Angel's Dream
- 2012 Dangerous And Real
- 2017 Alien
- 2018 Dirty Dancing
