= Angletrax =

- Origin: United Kingdom
- Genres: New wave, punk rock
- Years active: Late 1970s
- Label: Hansa Records

Angletrax was a British new wave/punk rock group that existed in the late 1970s, who were signed to Germany's Hansa Records label.

The members were: Wendy Herman (vocals), Martin Heath (bass), Lin Jammet (guitar), Jerry Minge (keyboards), Dan Who (drums).

In 1979, the band released an EP entitled "Things To Make And Do" and the LP "Angletrax" with the following songs: Silent Majority, Things to Make and Do, Why Not, Shepherds Bush, Bad Mood, Mental Block, Monica, Private Life, God and Chips, Propaganda Man, I to I, Preconceptions

The LP was released on Hansa'a Ariola label with number AHAL 8009. Recorded on either side of the arrival in power of Margaret Thatcher, it embodies a mature punk sensibility with echoes of mental instability, the madness of consumerism and urban decay. The band were on the bill at London's Marquee Club on Saturday 7 April 1979 and Friday 11 May 1979. They also played Eric's in Liverpool on 31 May 1979, with 'special guests' Orchestral Manoeuvres in the Dark.
