= Let's Talk About Love (Modern Talking album) =

Studio album by Modern Talking
- Released: 14 October 1985
- Recorded: 1985
- Genre: Eurodisco
- Length: 37:59
- Label: Hansa
- Producers: Dieter Bohlen; Luis Rodríguez

Modern Talking chronology
The 1st Album (1985)	Let's Talk About Love (1985)	Ready for Romance (1986)

Singles from Let's Talk About Love
- 1. "Cheri, Cheri Lady" Released: 2 September 1985

Let's Talk About Love is the second studio album by German duo Modern Talking, released on 14 October 1985 by Hansa Records. The album peaked at number two in Germany, spending four weeks at that position. After spending 11 weeks within the top 10 and 44 weeks altogether on the German chart, it eventually earned a platinum certification from the Bundesverband Musikindustrie (BVMI) for shipments in excess of 500,000 copies in Germany.

The album's only single, "Cheri, Cheri Lady", spent four weeks at the top of the German Singles Chart, while also topping the charts in Austria, Norway and Switzerland.

== Track listing ==
All tracks are written by Dieter Bohlen.

Side one
No.	Title	Length
1.	"Cheri, Cheri Lady"	3:45
2.	"With a Little Love"	3:33
3.	"Wild Wild Water"	4:17
4.	"You're the Lady of My Heart"	3:18
5.	"Just Like an Angel"	3:13

Side two
No.	Title	Length
6.	"Heaven Will Know"	4:01
7.	"Love Don't Live Here Anymore"	4:20
8.	"Why Did You Do It Just Tonight"	4:21
9.	"Don't Give Up"	3:18
10.	"Let's Talk About Love"	3:53
Total length:		37:59

== Personnel ==
- Dieter Bohlen – guitar, production, arrangements, songwriter
- Thomas Anders – lead vocals
- Rolf Köhler – backing vocals, falsetto choir
- Michael Scholz – backing vocals, falsetto choir
- Detlef Wiedeke – backing vocals, falsetto choir
- Birger Corleis – backing vocals, falsetto choir
- Luis Rodriguez – co-production, arrangements
- Ralf Stemmann – piano, keyboards, arrangements
- Gerd Tratz – artists photos
- Andreas Grassl – artists photos
- Manfred Vormstein – art direction, photo design

== Charts ==
=== Weekly charts ===
Weekly chart performance for Let's Talk About Love
Chart (1985)	Peak position
Austrian Albums (Ö3 Austria)	4
Dutch Albums (Album Top 100)	16
European Albums (Music & Media)	12
Finnish Albums (Suomen virallinen lista)	2
German Albums (Offizielle Top 100)	2
Norwegian Albums (VG-lista)	3
Spanish Albums (AFYVE)	3
Swedish Albums (Sverigetopplistan)	4
Swiss Albums (Schweizer Hitparade)	1

=== Monthly charts ===
Monthly chart performance for Let's Talk About Love
Chart (1987)	Peak position
Soviet Albums (Moskovskij Komsomolets)	4

=== Year-end charts ===
Year-end chart performance for Let's Talk About Love
Chart (1986)	Position
Austrian Albums (Ö3 Austria)	27
European Albums (Music & Media)	34
German Albums (Offizielle Top 100)	17
Swiss Albums (Schweizer Hitparade)	27

== Certifications ==
Certification for Let's Talk About Love
Region	Certification	Certified units/sales
Austria (IFPI Austria)	Platinum	50,000^{*}
Germany (BVMI)	Platinum	500,000^{^}
Hong Kong (IFPI Hong Kong)	Gold	10,000^{*}
Spain (Promusicae)	Gold	50,000^{^}
^{*} Sales figures based on certification alone.^{^} Shipments figures based on certification alone.

== Release history ==
- 1985 Germany: LP Hansa 207 080-630
- 1985 Germany: MC Hansa 407 080-630
- 1985 Germany: CD Hansa 610 522-222

== See also ==
- ...Sings Modern Talking: Let's Talk About Love
