= The 1st Album (Modern Talking album) =

Studio album by Modern Talking
- Released: 1 April 1985
- Recorded: 1984
- Genre: Eurodisco
- Length: 39:40
- Label: Hansa
- Producers: Dieter Bohlen; Luis Rodríguez

Modern Talking chronology
| The 1st Album (1985) | Let's Talk About Love (1985) |

Singles from The 1st Album
- 1. "You're My Heart, You're My Soul" Released: 24 September 1984; 2. "You Can Win If You Want" Released: 13 March 1985

The 1st Album is the debut studio album by German duo Modern Talking, released on 1 April 1985 by Hansa Records. The album reached number one in Germany on 27 May 1985, spending four weeks atop the chart and 18 weeks within the top 10. It was eventually certified platinum by the Bundesverband Musikindustrie (BVMI), denoting shipments in excess of 500,000 copies in Germany.

== Singles ==
The album spawned two singles. The lead single, "You're My Heart, You're My Soul", topped the charts in Germany (where it spent four weeks at the top), Austria, Switzerland and Belgium, while charting inside the top five in France, Norway and Sweden. The second single, "You Can Win If You Want", reached number one in Germany and Austria, number two in Switzerland and Belgium, and the top 10 in France and the Netherlands. Both singles attained gold sales status in Germany, having each sold over 250,000 units.

== Track listing ==
All tracks are written by Dieter Bohlen, except where noted.

Side one
| No. | Title | Length |
|---|---|---|
| 1. | "You're My Heart, You're My Soul" | 5:36 |
| 2. | "You Can Win If You Want" | 3:55 |
| 3. | "There's Too Much Blue in Missing You" | 4:40 |
| 4. | "Diamonds Never Made a Lady" | 4:05 |

Side two
| No. | Title | Length |
|---|---|---|
| 5. | "The Night Is Yours – The Night Is Mine" | 5:30 |
| 6. | "Do You Wanna" (lyrics: Bohlen, Mary Applegate) | 4:22 |
| 7. | "Lucky Guy" | 3:31 |
| 8. | "One in a Million" | 3:44 |
| 9. | "Bells of Paris" | 4:17 |
| Total length: | | 39:40 |

== Personnel ==
- Dieter Bohlen – lead vocals (3), guitar, production, arrangements, songwriter
- Thomas Anders – lead vocals (all but 3)
- Rolf Köhler – backing vocals, falsetto choir (uncredited)
- Michael Scholz – backing vocals, falsetto choir (uncredited)
- Detlef Wiedeke – backing vocals, falsetto choir (uncredited)
- Birger Corleis – lead vocals (3), backing vocals, falsetto choir (uncredited)
- Luis Rodriguez – co-producer, arrangements
- Ralf Stemmann – piano, keyboards, arrangements
- Manfred Vormstein – art direction, cover photo
- Fryderyk Gabowicz – artists photos

== Charts ==
=== Weekly charts ===
Weekly chart performance for The 1st Album
| Chart (1985–1986) | Peak position |
|---|---|
| Austrian Albums (Ö3 Austria) | 2 |
| Dutch Albums (Album Top 100) | 9 |
| European Albums (Music & Media) | 9 |
| Finnish Albums (Suomen virallinen lista) | 1 |
| German Albums (Offizielle Top 100) | 1 |
| Norwegian Albums (VG-lista) | 5 |
| Spanish Albums (AFYVE) | 5 |
| Swedish Albums (Sverigetopplistan) | 12 |
| Swiss Albums (Schweizer Hitparade) | 2 |

=== Year-end charts ===
Year-end chart performance for The 1st Album
| Chart (1985) | Position |
|---|---|
| Austrian Albums (Ö3 Austria) | 8 |
| Dutch Albums (Album Top 100) | 44 |
| German Albums (Offizielle Top 100) | 9 |
| Swiss Albums (Schweizer Hitparade) | 3 |

== Certifications ==
Certifications for The 1st Album
| Region | Certification | Certified units/sales |
|---|---|---|
| Austria (IFPI Austria) | Platinum | 50,000^{*} |
| Germany (BVMI) | Platinum | 500,000^{^} |
| Poland (ZPAV) | Gold | 50,000^{*} |
| Spain (Promusicae) | Gold | 50,000^{^} |
^{*} Sales figures based on certification alone.^{^} Shipments figures based on certification alone.

== Release history ==
- 1985 Germany: LP Hansa 206 818-620.
- 1985 Germany: MC Hansa 406 818-652.
- 1985 Germany: CD Hansa 610 338-222

== See also ==
- ...Sings Modern Talking: The 1st Album
