= Cheri, Cheri Lady =

1985 single by Modern Talking

Single by Modern Talking

from the album Let's Talk About Love
- Released: 2 September 1985
- Genre: Dance-pop
- Length: 3:45
- Label: Hansa
- Songwriter: Dieter Bohlen
- Producers: Dieter Bohlen; Luis Rodríguez

Modern Talking singles chronology
"You Can Win If You Want" (1985)	"Cheri, Cheri Lady" (1985)	"Brother Louie" (1986)

Music video
- "Cheri, Cheri Lady" on YouTube

"Cheri, Cheri Lady" is a song by German pop duo Modern Talking from their second album, Let's Talk About Love (1985). It was released as the album's only single on 2 September 1985 and reached number one on the German Singles Chart, becoming the duo's third consecutive number-one single in West Germany, following "You're My Heart, You're My Soul" and "You Can Win If You Want". The single spent four weeks at the top and a total of twenty-four weeks on the German chart, and eventually went Gold, selling over 250,000 units. "Cheri, Cheri Lady" has also been certified Silver in France, denoting sales in excess of 250,000 units.

== Lyrics ==
The lyrics tell the story of a man, alone for too long, who invites a woman to give him her heart.

== Track listings ==
- 7-inch single
1. "Cheri, Cheri Lady" – 3:45
2. "Cheri, Cheri Lady" (Instrumental) – 3:37
- 12-inch maxi-single
1. "Cheri, Cheri Lady" (Special Dance Version) – 4:52
2. "Cheri, Cheri Lady" (Instrumental) – 3:37

== Charts ==
=== Weekly charts ===
Weekly chart performance for "Cheri, Cheri Lady"
Chart (1985–1986)	Peak position
Austria (Ö3 Austria Top 40)	1
Belgium (Ultratop 50 Flanders)	3
Denmark (IFPI)	3
Europe (European Hot 100 Singles)	8
Finland (Suomen virallinen lista)	1
France (SNEP)	18
Greece (IFPI)	1
Italy (Musica e dischi)	15
Netherlands (Dutch Top 40)	10
Netherlands (Single Top 100)	8
Norway (VG-lista)	1
South Africa (Springbok Radio)	13
Spain (AFYVE)	1
Sweden (Sverigetopplistan)	3
Switzerland (Schweizer Hitparade)	1
West Germany (GfK)	1

=== Year-end charts ===
Year-end chart performance for "Cheri, Cheri Lady"
Chart (1985)	Position
Belgium (Ultratop 50 Flanders)	23
Netherlands (Dutch Top 40)	85
Netherlands (Single Top 100)	86
Switzerland (Schweizer Hitparade)	21
West Germany (Official German Charts)	18

== Certifications ==
Certifications for "Cheri, Cheri Lady"
Region	Certification	Certified units/sales
Denmark (IFPI Danmark)	Gold	45,000^{‡}
France (SNEP)	Silver	250,000^{*}
Germany (BVMI)	Gold	500,000^{^}
Italy (FIMI)	Gold	50,000^{‡}
Spain (Promusicae)	Gold	30,000^{‡}
United Kingdom (BPI)	Silver	200,000^{‡}
^{*} Sales figures based on certification alone.^{^} Shipments figures based on certification alone.^{‡} Sales+streaming figures based on certification alone.

== "Cheri, Cheri Lady '98" ==
"Cheri, Cheri Lady '98"

Single by Modern Talking

from the album Back for Good
- Released: 1998
- Length: 3:04
- Label: BMG; Ariola
- Songwriter: Dieter Bohlen
- Producers: Dieter Bohlen Luis Rodríguez (co.)

"Cheri, Cheri Lady '98" is the fourth single from Modern Talking's seventh album, Back for Good, and also the extended single after the duo's reunion featuring Eric Singleton. "Cheri, Cheri Lady '98" is the re-packaged version of the original 1985 version of "Cheri, Cheri Lady".

=== Track listing ===
- "Cheri, Cheri Lady '98" – 3:04
- "Cheri, Cheri Lady '98" (Extended Version) – 4:26

== Capital Bra version ==
"Cherry Lady"

Single by Capital Bra
- Language: German
- Released: 22 March 2019
- Recorded: 2019
- Length: 2:15
- Label: Bra Musik
- Songwriters: Dieter Bohlen, Capital Bra
- Producer: Jumpa

Capital Bra singles chronology
"Wir ticken" (2019)	"Cherry Lady" (2019)	"Glitza" (2019)

Music video
- "Cherry Lady" on YouTube

German rapper Capital Bra released a German-language version of the song with added rap verses in March 2019. The cover was released following Dieter Bohlen's comments in German media that he did not like modern rappers for flaunting their wealth, saying, "everybody raps about his Maybach but at the end of the day they ride their bicycle home to their two-room flat" and that in 35 years nobody will remember Capital Bra's songs. Although Capital Bra initially criticised Bohlen's comments, the two later appeared in a video together on Instagram announcing the release of the cover. The YouTube video for the song was viewed over 500,000 times on its day of release. The song went on to become Capital Bra's twelfth number-one song in Germany, making him tie the record for having the most number-one singles along with The Beatles.

=== Charts ===
==== Weekly charts ====
Weekly chart performance for "Cheri Lady"
Chart (2019)	Peak position
Austria (Ö3 Austria Top 40)	1
Germany (GfK)	1
Switzerland (Schweizer Hitparade)	1

==== Year-end charts ====
Year-end chart performance for "Cheri Lady"
Chart (2019)	Position
Austria (Ö3 Austria Top 40)	24
Germany (Official German Charts)	21
Switzerland (Schweizer Hitparade)	47

=== Certifications ===
Certifications for "Cheri Lady"
Region	Certification	Certified units/sales
Germany (BVMI)	Platinum	400,000^{‡}
^{‡} Sales+streaming figures based on certification alone.

== Maléna version ==
"Cheri Cheri Lady"

Single by Maléna
- Language: English
- Released: 23 October 2022
- Recorded: 2022
- Genre: Techno-pop
- Length: 2:23
- Label: TKN
- Songwriter: Dieter Bohlen
- Producer: Tokionine

Maléna singles chronology
"Qami Qami" (2021)	"Cheri Cheri Lady" (2022)	"Can't Feel Anything" (2022)

Music video
- "Cheri Cheri Lady" on YouTube

Armenian singer Maléna released a cover version of the song featuring Armenian producer Tokionine on 23 October 2022. Malena said of the song on her Instagram, "I recorded a cover of a classic European hit from the 1980s because I thought the song would evoke nostalgia in many people". In February 2023, the song went viral on TikTok in Indonesia and Vietnam, reaching the top of the Top 50 Viral on Spotify and iTunes in Vietnam. On 26 February, the song reached the general Top 50 songs in Vietnam on Spotify. The song debuted at number 72 on the Billboard Vietnam Hot 100 list published on 2 March 2023, eventually peaking at number 26 on the list a week later.

=== Charts ===
Chart performance for "Cheri Cheri Lady"
Chart (2023)	Peak position
Vietnam (Vietnam Hot 100)	26

== Usage in media ==
"Cheri, Cheri Lady" is featured in the 2017 Indian film Arjun Reddy.

The melody of "Cheri, Cheri Lady" is also used in Teen Titans Go! Season 1, Episode 23: Burgers Vs Burritos.

In 2025, Anders performed a version of the song at the Die Beatrice Egli Show together with the Swiss singer. However, in this performance, the two original verses were replaced by German language ones, but the chorus remained the same, in English. In the first verse, Anders recalled the 1980s as an era defined by excess and color, evoking imagery of flamboyance, spectacle, and commercial success. Egli responded by positioning herself as someone who knows this period only through stories (as she was born in 1988, one year after the first breakup of Modern Talking), expressing both curiosity and admiration for a time she did not personally experience, which she characterized as wild and unrestrained. The verse concluded with Anders saying the world sang the song. The second verse shifted focus from nostalgia to endurance. Egli portrayed Anders as immortal in a metaphorical sense, emphasizing how his work has survived the passage of time. Anders replied with humility, describing longevity in music as a gift. Egli then closed the second verse.

Since 2023, "Cheri, Cheri Lady" has frequently been used in video clips on social media sites, particularly Instagram and YouTube where it has over 1 billion views as of October 2026.

== See also ==
- Lists of number-one singles (Austria)
- List of number-one hits of 1985 (Germany)
- List of number-one songs in Norway
- List of number-one singles of 1986 (Spain)
- List of number-one singles of the 1980s (Switzerland)
