= Atlantis Is Calling (S.O.S. for Love) =

1986 single by Modern Talking

Single by Modern Talking

from the album Ready for Romance
- Released: 28 April 1986
- Recorded: February 1986
- Genre: Eurodisco
- Length: 3:48
- Label: Hansa
- Songwriter: Dieter Bohlen
- Producers: Dieter Bohlen; Luis Rodríguez

Modern Talking singles chronology
"Brother Louie" (1986)	"Atlantis Is Calling (S.O.S. for Love)" (1986)	"Geronimo's Cadillac" (1986)

Music video
- "Atlantis Is Calling (S.O.S. for Love)" on YouTube

"Atlantis Is Calling (S.O.S. for Love)" is a song by German pop duo Modern Talking, released as the second single from their third studio album, Ready for Romance (1986). It is the duo's fifth and final consecutive single to reach No. 1 on the German Singles Chart. "Atlantis is Calling (S.O.S. for Love)" was released in Germany and in other European territories on 28 April 1986, it peaked at No. 1 in Germany on 16 June 1986 after spending two weeks at No. 2 position. The single spent four weeks at the top and total of 14 weeks on the top 100. While "Atlantis Is Calling (S.O.S. for Love)" entered the top five in Switzerland, Austria and Sweden, it managed to chart within the top 10 in the Netherlands and Norway.

== Critical reception ==
In a review published in Smash Hits, Gary Kemp of the Spandau Ballet band was critical of "Atlantis Is Calling (S.O.S. for Love)", stating he considered it as "rubbish" and that the appeal of the song lies in "the simplicity and the fact that the hookline is 'woah woah woah'", which means that people of any language can sing it.

== Track listings ==
- 7-inch single (Hansa 108 239 1986)
1. "Atlantis Is Calling (S.O.S. for Love)"
2. "Atlantis Is Calling (S.O.S. for Love)" (Instrumental)
- 12-inch single (Hansa 608 239 1986)
1. "Atlantis Is Calling (S.O.S. for Love)" (Extended Version)
2. "Atlantis Is Calling (S.O.S. for Love)" (Instrumental)

== Charts ==
=== Weekly charts ===
Weekly chart performance for "Atlantis Is Calling (S.O.S. for Love)"
Chart (1986)	Peak position
Austria (Ö3 Austria Top 40)	2
Belgium (Ultratop 50 Flanders)	4
Europe (European Hot 100 Singles)	16
France (SNEP)	21
Greece (IFPI)	2
Italy (Musica e dischi)	15
Netherlands (Dutch Top 40)	6
Netherlands (Single Top 100)	6
Norway (VG-lista)	8
Quebec (ADISQ)	17
South Africa (Springbok Radio)	12
Spain (AFYVE)	2
Sweden (Sverigetopplistan)	3
Switzerland (Schweizer Hitparade)	3
UK Singles (OCC)	55
West Germany (GfK)	1

=== Year-end charts ===
Year-end chart performance for "Atlantis Is Calling (S.O.S. for Love)"
Chart (1986)	Position
Austria (Ö3 Austria Top 40)	18
Belgium (Ultratop 50 Flanders)	20
Europe (European Hot 100 Singles)	35
Netherlands (Dutch Top 40)	83
Netherlands (Single Top 100)	79
West Germany (Official German Charts)	11

== Certifications ==
Certifications for "Atlantis Is Calling (S.O.S. for Love)"
Region	Certification	Certified units/sales
Belgium (BRMA)	Gold	100,000
