= Fuente el Fresno =

Village in Spain

Coordinates: 39°14′N 3°46′W

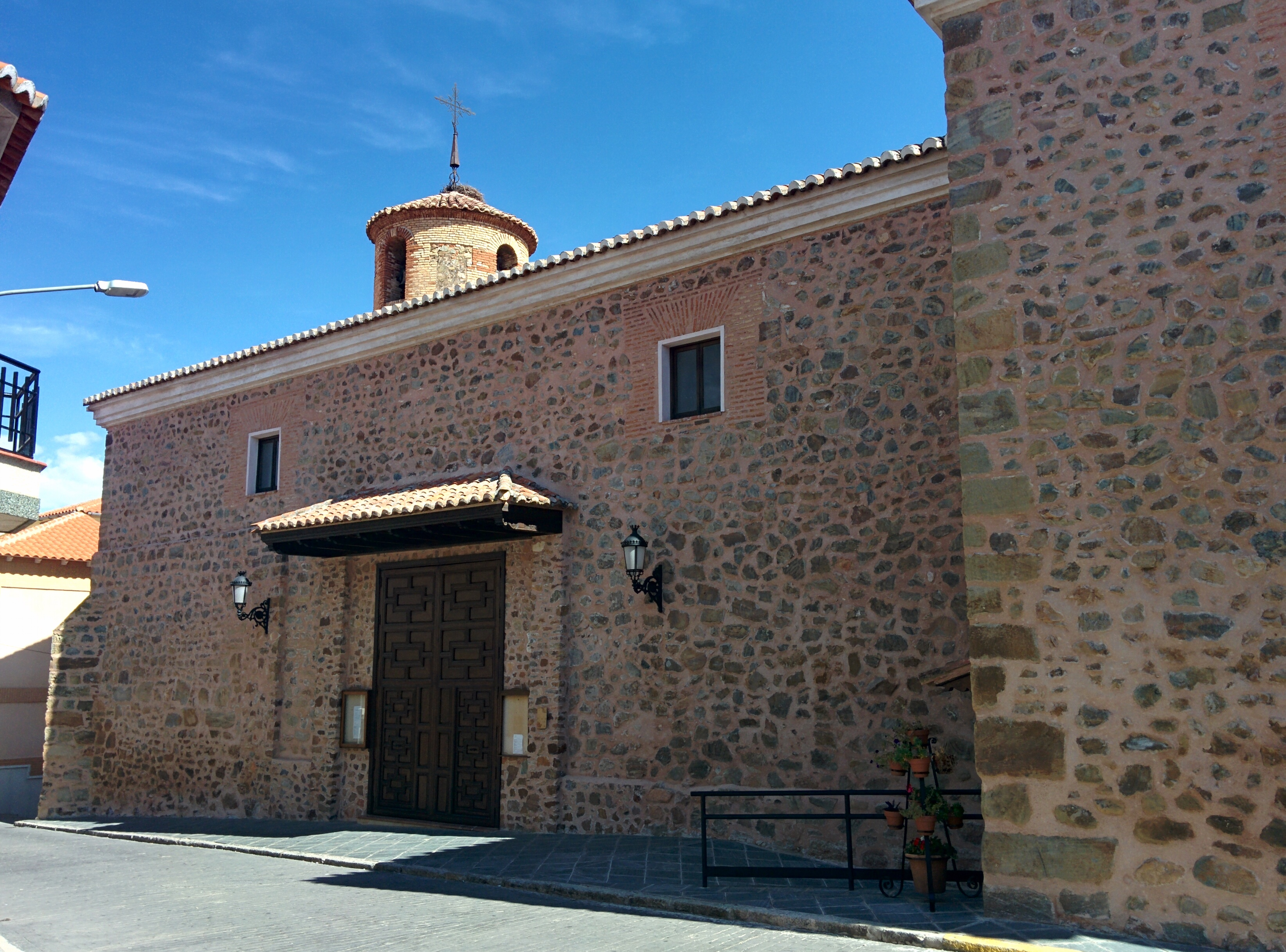
Santa Quiteria Church in Fuente el Fresno, Ciudad Real, Spain

Flag of Fuente el Fresno

Coat of arms of Fuente el Fresno

Fuente el Fresno is a municipality in Ciudad Real, Castile-La Mancha, Spain. It has a population of 3,544.

The village of Fuente el Fresno is located within the formers Estados del Duque, in the Montes de Toledo. It is located a short distance from the border between the provinces of Toledo and Ciudad Real. The Tablas de Daimiel National Park is within a short distance.
Fuente el Fresno is located on the Route of Don Quixote and it is set in a small valley between two mountains (about 100 meters). The oldest part of the village is in the foothill of one of those two mountains and the newest part is in the plain of the valley.
