= Win the Race =

Single by Modern Talking

from the album America
- Released: 26 February 2001
- Genre: Pop
- Length: 3:35
- Label: BMG; Ariola
- Songwriter: Dieter Bohlen
- Producers: Dieter Bohlen; Axel Breitung

Modern Talking singles chronology
"Don't Take Away My Heart" (2000)	"Win the Race" (2001)	"Last Exit to Brooklyn" (2001)

Music video
- "Win the Race" on YouTube

"Win the Race" is a song by German pop duo Modern Talking. It was released in February 2001 as the first single from the tenth album America. "Win the Race", released in Germany and in other European territories on 26 February 2001, was composed by Dieter Bohlen and became the anthem for Formula One in Germany in 2001. The single peaked at number 5 in Germany on 26 March 2001, exactly one month after its release. While the single was successful enough in Germany to spend total of 13 weeks on the singles-chart, it only managed to peak at number 14 in Austria, meanwhile entering the top-40 in Switzerland and Sweden.

== Track listing ==
- CD maxi single (Hansa 74321 84311 2 (BMG) / EAN 0743218431128 26 February 2001
1. "Win the Race" (radio edit) – 3:35
2. "Win the Race" (instrumental version) – 3:39
3. "Win the Race" (Scooter remix) – 4:43
4. "Cinderella Girl" – 3:34
5. "Cinderella Girl" (instrumental version) – 3:34

== Charts ==
=== Weekly charts ===
Weekly chart performance for "Win the Race"
Chart (2001)	Peak position
Austria (Ö3 Austria Top 40)	14
Germany (GfK)	5
Poland Airplay (Music & Media)	13
Romania (Romanian Top 100)	4
Sweden (Sverigetopplistan)	36
Switzerland (Schweizer Hitparade)	31

=== Year-end charts ===
Year-end chart performance for "Win the Race"
Chart (2001)	Position
Germany (Media Control)	64
