= Brother Louie (Modern Talking song) =

1986 single by Modern Talking

Single by Modern Talking

from the album Ready for Romance
- B-side: "Doctor for My Heart"
- Released: 27 January 1986
- Recorded: November 1985
- Genre: Dance-pop
- Length: 3:41
- Label: Hansa
- Songwriter: Dieter Bohlen
- Producers: Dieter Bohlen; Luis Rodríguez

Modern Talking singles chronology
"Cheri, Cheri Lady" (1985)	"Brother Louie" (1986)	"Atlantis Is Calling (S.O.S. for Love)" (1986)

Music video
- "Brother Louie" on YouTube

"Brother Louie" is a song by German pop duo Modern Talking, released as the lead single from their third studio album, Ready for Romance (1986). It was their fourth consecutive single to top the German Singles Chart, after "You're My Heart, You're My Soul", "You Can Win If You Want" and "Cheri, Cheri Lady".

== Background ==
"Brother Louie" was released on 27 January 1986 and it reached No. 1 on 3 March 1986 in Germany. The single spent four weeks at the top and total of 17 weeks on the German chart. In the United Kingdom, it peaked at No. 4 in the charts on 24 August 1986 for two consecutive weeks and went silver for shipments in excess of 250,000 units. "Brother Louie" was also certified silver in France for selling over 250,000 units.

It is believed that the song was written by Dieter Bohlen about producer Luis Rodríguez, as he was a close associate of Bohlen and worked on many of the Modern Talking songs.

In 1998, not long after the duo's reunion, a remixed version of the single was released, titled "Brother Louie '98". The single, released in a new sleeve, was also successful. It went gold in France for selling over 250,000 units. "Brother Louie" became a popular song in North Korea, due to the North Korean orchestra Pochonbo Electronic Ensemble making a cover of the song.

== Music video ==
The music video of "Brother Louie" was directed by Pit Weyrich and contains footage from the 1984 film Once Upon a Time in America, interspersed with the band members playing on a stage surrounded by dancing fans.

== Track listing ==
- German 12" maxi single
1. "Brother Louie" (Special Long Version) – 5:20
2. "Brother Louie" (Instrumental) – 4:06
- German 7" single
1. "Brother Louie" – 3:41
2. "Brother Louie" (Instrumental) – 4:06
- UK 12" maxi single
1. "Brother Louie" (Special Long Version) – 5:15
2. "Doctor for My Heart" – 3:16
3. "Brother Louie" (Instrumental) – 4:06
- UK 7" single
1. "Brother Louie" – 3:41
2. "Brother Louie" (Instrumental) – 4:06

== Charts ==
=== Weekly charts ===
1986 weekly chart performance for "Brother Louie"
Chart (1986)	Peak position
Austria (Ö3 Austria Top 40)	2
Belgium (Ultratop 50 Flanders)	5
Canada Top Singles (RPM)	67
Denmark (IFPI)	2
Europe (European Hot 100 Singles)	6
Finland (Suomen virallinen lista)	1
France (SNEP)	6
Greece (IFPI)	1
Ireland (IRMA)	2
Netherlands (Dutch Top 40)	20
Netherlands (Single Top 100)	16
Norway (VG-lista)	8
Quebec (ADISQ)	1
South Africa (Springbok Radio)	1
Spain (AFYVE)	1
Sweden (Sverigetopplistan)	1
Switzerland (Schweizer Hitparade)	2
UK Singles (Official Charts)	4
West Germany (GfK)	1

2022 weekly chart performance for "Brother Louie"
Chart (2022)	Peak position
Hungary (Single Top 40)	15

=== Year-end charts ===
Year-end chart performance for "Brother Louie"
Chart (1986)	Position
Austria (Ö3 Austria Top 40)	23
Belgium (Ultratop 50 Flanders)	28
Europe (European Hot 100 Singles)	7
South Africa (Springbok Radio)	2
Switzerland (Schweizer Hitparade)	25
UK Singles (OCC)	56
West Germany (Media Control)	14

1985–1989 chart performance for "Brother Louie"
Chart (1985–1989)	Position
Europe (European Hot 100 Singles)	92

== Certifications ==
Certifications for "Brother Louie"
Region	Certification	Certified units/sales
Belgium (BRMA)	Gold	100,000
Denmark (IFPI Danmark)	Gold	45,000^{‡}
France (SNEP)	Silver	250,000^{*}
Germany (BVMI)	Gold	300,000^{‡}
Italy (FIMI)	Gold	50,000^{‡}
Spain (Promusicae)	Gold	30,000^{‡}
United Kingdom (BPI)	Silver	250,000^{^}
^{*} Sales figures based on certification alone.^{^} Shipments figures based on certification alone.^{‡} Sales+streaming figures based on certification alone.

== "Brother Louie '98" ==
"Brother Louie '98"

Single by Modern Talking

from the album Back for Good
- Released: 20 July 1998
- Genre: Dance-pop
- Length: 3:23
- Label: BMG; Ariola
- Songwriter: Dieter Bohlen
- Producers: Dieter Bohlen; Luis Rodríguez

Modern Talking singles chronology
"You're My Heart, You're My Soul '98" (1998)	"Brother Louie '98" (1998)	"Space Mix '98" (1998)

Music video
- "Brother Louie '98" on YouTube

"Brother Louie '98" is the re-packaged version of the original 1986 version of "Brother Louie", released as the second single from Modern Talking's seventh studio album, Back for Good (1998), and also the second single following the duo's reunion. "Brother Louie '98". The single, as the first single "You're My Heart, You're My Soul '98" off Back For Good, features Eric Singleton.

"Brother Louie '98" was released in Germany and in other European territories on 20 July 1998. The single charted within the top 20 in Germany and Austria, while reaching number one in Hungary, the top five in France and the top 10 in Sweden. In France, "Brother Louie '98" reached gold status for selling over 250,000 units.

=== Track listing ===
- CD maxi single
1. "Brother Louie '98" (Radio Edit) – 3:23
2. "Brother Louie '98" – 3:35
3. "Brother Louie '98" (Extended Version) – 4:11
4. "Cheri Cheri Lady '98" (Extended Version) – 4:26

=== Personnel ===
- Music by: Dieter Bohlen
- Writer: Dieter Bohlen
- Rapper: Eric Singleton
- Changes: Dieter Bohlen
- Production: Dieter Bohlen
- Co-production: Luis Rodríguez
- Publication: Blue Obsession Music/Warner Chappell/Intro
- Distribution: BMG Company
- Photography: Manfred Vormstein
- Design: Reinsberg WAB

=== Charts ===
==== Weekly charts ====
Weekly chart performance for "Brother Louie '98"
Chart (1998)	Peak position
Austria (Ö3 Austria Top 40)	17
Belgium (Ultratip Bubbling Under Flanders)	7
Belgium (Ultratop 50 Wallonia)	26
Europe (Eurochart Hot 100 Singles)	13
France (SNEP)	2
Germany (GfK)	16
Hungary (MAHASZ)	1
Netherlands (Dutch Top 40 Tipparade)	2
Netherlands (Single Top 100)	51
Poland Airplay (Music & Media)	3
Spain (AFYVE)	2
Sweden (Sverigetopplistan)	9
Switzerland (Schweizer Hitparade)	21

==== Year-end charts ====
Year-end chart performance for "Brother Louie '98"
Chart (1998)	Position
Europe Border Breakers (Music & Media)	45
France (SNEP)	34
Sweden (Hitlistan)	60

=== Certifications ===
Certifications for "Brother Louie '98"
Region	Certification	Certified units/sales
France (SNEP)	Gold	250,000^{*}
^{*} Sales figures based on certification alone.

== "Brother Louie '99" ==
"Brother Louie '99"

Single by Modern Talking

from the album Back for Good
- Released: 1999 (UK)
- Recorded: 1998–1999
- Length: 3:54 (DJ Cappiccio Remix)
- Label: BMG
- Songwriter: Dieter Bohlen
- Producers: Dieter Bohlen; Luis Rodríguez

Modern Talking singles chronology
"Sexy, Sexy Lover" (1999)	"Brother Louie '99" (1999)	"It's Christmas 2000" (2000)

"Brother Louie '99" is another re-packaged version of the original "Brother Louie" from Modern Talking's album Back for Good. This version was released solely for the UK market and contains remixes that were not included on "Brother Louie '98".

=== Track listings ===
- CD maxi single
1. "Brother Louie '99" (DJ Cappiccio Radio Mix) – 3:54
2. "Brother Louie '99" (DJ Cappiccio Extended Mix) – 7:33
3. "Brother Louie '99" (Metro Club Mix) – 6:14
- 12-inch single
1. "Brother Louie '99" (DJ Cappiccio 12" Mix) – 7:35
2. "Brother Louie '99" (DJ Cappiccio Radio Mix) – 3:54
3. "Brother Louie '99" (DJ Cappiccio Instrumental) – 7:34
4. "Brother Louie '99" (DJ Cappicio Acapella) – 6:47
- 2× 12-inch single
1. "Brother Louie '99" (Metro Club Mix) – 6:13
2. "Brother Louie '99" (Metro Radio Mix) – 3:48
3. "Brother Louie '99" (Paul Masterson Club Mix) – 6:39
4. "Brother Louie '99" (Paul Masterson Dub) – 6:26

== Kay One version ==
"Louis Louis"

Single by Kay One

from the album Makers Gonna Make
- Released: 19 May 2017
- Recorded: 2017
- Length: 3:36
- Label: Sony
- Songwriters: Dieter Bohlen; Kenneth Glöckler
- Producer: Stard Ova

Kay One singles chronology
"Believe" (2015)	"Louis Louis" (2017)	"Senorita" (2017)

Music video
- "Louis Louis" on YouTube

The song was covered by German rapper and singer Kay One in 2017 as "Louis Louis". The adaptation borrows largely from the original, but with new all-German lyrics and an added rap section, the latter including additional sampling from the song.

The single reached No. 9 on the German Singles Chart. The song also charted in Austria and Switzerland.

=== Music video ===
Kay One also released a music video that opens with some verses of the original Modern Talking song "Brother Louie" with Kay One browsing a number of Modern Talking release covers.

=== Charts ===
Chart performance for "Louis Louis"
Chart (2017)	Peak position
Austria (Ö3 Austria Top 40)	16
Germany (GfK)	9
Switzerland (Schweizer Hitparade)	58

=== Certifications ===
Certifications for "Louis Louis"
Region	Certification	Certified units/sales
Germany (BVMI)	Platinum	400,000^{‡}
^{‡} Sales+streaming figures based on certification alone.

== Vize version ==
"Brother Louie"

Single by Vize, Imanbek and Dieter Bohlen featuring Leony
- Released: 10 July 2020
- Length: 2:50
- Label: Kontor
- Songwriter: Dieter Bohlen
- Producers: Vize; Imanbek

Music video
- "Brother Louie" on YouTube

In July 2020, German DJ duo Vize, Kazakh DJ Imanbek and Modern Talking member Dieter Bohlen released a cover of "Brother Louie", with Leony singing the chorus parts.

=== Charts ===
Chart performance for "Brother Louie"
Chart (2020)	Peak position
Austria (Ö3 Austria Top 40)	32
Germany (GfK)	64
Poland Airplay (ZPAV)	27

=== Certifications ===
Certifications for "Brother Louie"
Region	Certification	Certified units/sales
Poland (ZPAV)	Platinum	50,000^{‡}
^{‡} Sales+streaming figures based on certification alone.
