= You're My Heart, You're My Soul =

1984 single by Modern Talking

Single by Modern Talking

from the album The 1st Album
- Released: 24 September 1984
- Genre: Dance-pop
- Length: 5:35
- Label: Hansa
- Songwriter: Steve Benson
- Producers: Steve Benson; Luis Rodríguez

Modern Talking singles chronology
"You're My Heart, You're My Soul" (1984)	"You Can Win If You Want" (1985)

Music video
- "You're My Heart, You're My Soul" on YouTube

"You're My Heart, You're My Soul" is a song by German pop duo Modern Talking. Written by Dieter Bohlen under the pseudonym Steven Benson, the song was released as the lead single from their debut studio album, The 1st Album (1985). The single was released in September 1984 and entered the West German top 10 on 28 January 1985. It took another five weeks for the single to top the chart, spending six weeks at the summit and 25 weeks within the top 100, eventually reaching gold status for shipping over 500,000 units domestically. "You're My Heart, You're My Soul" is considered their best-selling single to date with worldwide sales said to exceed eight million copies.

The single was remixed in 1998 as "You're My Heart, You're My Soul '98" for the duo's reunion. The single in a newer package gained a similar success again, earning them a platinum-award for selling over 500,000 units in Germany alone.

== Track listings ==
- 7-inch single
1. "You're My Heart, You're My Soul" – 3:48
2. "You're My Heart, You're My Soul" (Instrumental Version) – 4:01
- 12-inch single
1. "You're My Heart, You're My Soul" – 5:35
2. "You're My Heart, You're My Soul" (Instrumental Version) – 4:01

== Charts ==
=== Weekly charts ===
1985 weekly chart performance for "You're My Heart, You're My Soul"
Chart (1985)	Peak position
Austria (Ö3 Austria Top 40)	1
Belgium (Ultratop 50 Flanders)	1
Denmark (IFPI)	1
Europe (European Top 100 Singles)	4
Finland (Suomen virallinen lista)	2
France (SNEP)	3
Italy (Musica e dischi)	18
Netherlands (Dutch Top 40)	4
Netherlands (Single Top 100)	6
Norway (VG-lista)	3
Portugal (AFP)	1
Quebec (ADISQ)	50
South Africa (Springbok Radio)	2
Spain (AFYVE)	2
Sweden (Sverigetopplistan)	3
Switzerland (Schweizer Hitparade)	1
UK Singles (Official Charts)	56
West Germany (GfK)	1

2026 weekly chart performance for "You're My Heart, You're My Soul"
Chart (2026)	Peak position
Poland (Polish Airplay Top 100)	79

=== Year-end charts ===
1985 year-end chart performance for "You're My Heart, You're My Soul"
Chart (1985)	Position
Austria (Ö3 Austria Top 40)	2
Belgium (Ultratop 50 Flanders)	7
France (IFOP)	12
Netherlands (Dutch Top 40)	27
Netherlands (Single Top 100)	34
South Africa (Springbok Radio)	7
Switzerland (Schweizer Hitparade)	3
West Germany (Media Control)	2

2023 year-end chart performance for "You're My Heart, You're My Soul"
Chart (2023)	Position
Kazakhstan Airplay (TopHit)	198

2024 year-end chart performance for "You're My Heart, You're My Soul"
Chart (2024)	Position
Kazakhstan Airplay (TopHit)	86

== Certifications ==
Certifications for "You're My Heart, You're My Soul"
Region	Certification	Certified units/sales
Denmark (IFPI Danmark)	Gold	4,000^{^}
France (SNEP)	Gold	500,000^{*}
Germany (BVMI)	Gold	500,000^{^}
Sweden (GLF)	Gold	25,000^{^}
Switzerland (IFPI Switzerland)	Gold	25,000^{^}
^{*} Sales figures based on certification alone.^{^} Shipments figures based on certification alone.

== "You're My Heart, You're My Soul '98" ==
"You're My Heart, You're My Soul '98"

Single by Modern Talking

from the album Back for Good
- Released: 16 March 1998
- Genre: Dance-pop
- Length: 3:49; 3:18 (with Eric Singleton)
- Label: BMG; Ariola
- Songwriter: Dieter Bohlen
- Producer: Dieter Bohlen

Modern Talking singles chronology
"In 100 Years..." (1987)	"You're My Heart, You're My Soul '98" (1998)	"Brother Louie '98" (1998)

Music video
- "You're My Heart, You're My Soul '98" on YouTube

"You're My Heart, You're My Soul '98", a repackaged version of "You're My Heart, You're My Soul", was released as the lead single from Modern Talking's seventh studio album, Back for Good (1998), marking the first single after their reunion in 1998. This version features new lyrics, performed by American rapper Eric Singleton.

"You're My Heart, You're My Soul '98" was released in 1998. It reached number one in Hungary and entered the top five in several countries including Germany, Switzerland, Austria, France, while entering the top 10 in many others including Sweden and Finland. In Germany, the single entered the top 10 on 6 April 1998, peaking at number two the following week. After spending 10 weeks within the top 10, it eventually earned a platinum-award for selling over 500,000 units in Germany alone. In France, "You're My Heart, You're My Soul '98" peaked at number three eventually earning a gold award for selling over 250,000 units.

=== Track listings ===
- German CD single
1. "You're My Heart, You're My Soul" (Modern Talking Mix '98) – 3:49
2. "You're My Heart, You're My Soul" (Classic Mix '98) – 3:41
- German CD maxi single
1. "You're My Heart, You're My Soul" (Modern Talking Mix '98) – 3:49
2. "You're My Heart, You're My Soul" (Classic Mix '98) – 3:41
3. "You're My Heart, You're My Soul" (Modern Talking Mix '98 featuring Eric Singleton) – 3:17
4. "You're My Heart, You're My Soul" (Original Short Mix '84) – 3:22
5. "You're My Heart, You're My Soul" (Original Long Mix '84) – 5:36
- UK CD maxi single
1. "You're My Heart, You're My Soul" (Modern Talking Mix '98) – 3:53
2. "You're My Heart, You're My Soul" (Original Long Mix '84) – 5:33
3. "You're My Heart, You're My Soul" 1998 (Paul Masterson's extended mix) – 7:15
- UK 12-inch maxi single
1. "You're My Heart, You're My Soul" (Paul Masterson extended mix) – 7:15
2. "You're My Heart, You're My Soul" (Paul Masterson dub) – 6:52
3. "You're My Heart, You're My Soul" (Modern Talking Mix '98 featuring Eric Singleton) – 3:15
4. "You're My Heart, You're My Soul" (Original Long Mix '84) – 5:36

=== Charts ===
==== Weekly charts ====
Weekly chart performance for "You're My Heart, You're My Soul '98"
Chart (1998)	Peak position
Austria (Ö3 Austria Top 40)	2
Belgium (Ultratop 50 Flanders)	26
Belgium (Ultratop 50 Wallonia)	10
Europe (Eurochart Hot 100 Singles)	9
Finland (Suomen virallinen lista)	8
France (SNEP)	3
Germany (GfK)	2
Hungary (Mahasz)	1
Iceland (Íslenski Listinn Topp 40)	14
Ireland (IRMA)	8
Sweden (Sverigetopplistan)	6
Switzerland (Schweizer Hitparade)	4

==== Year-end charts ====
Year-end chart performance for "You're My Heart, You're My Soul '98"
Chart (1998)	Position
Austria (Ö3 Austria Top 40)	23
Belgium (Ultratop 50 Wallonia)	47
Europe (Eurochart Hot 100)	28
Europe Border Breakers (Music & Media)	32
France (SNEP)	12
Germany (Media Control)	21
Sweden (Hitlistan)	23
Switzerland (Schweizer Hitparade)	35

=== Certifications ===
Certifications for "You're My Heart, You're My Soul '98"
Region	Certification	Certified units/sales
Belgium (BRMA)	Gold	25,000^{*}
France (SNEP)	Gold	250,000^{*}
Germany (BVMI)	Platinum	500,000^{^}
Sweden (GLF)	Platinum	30,000^{^}
^{*} Sales figures based on certification alone.^{^} Shipments figures based on certification alone.

== Cover versions ==
In 2022, Modern Talking's composer and producer Dieter Bohlen recorded a German language version together with German pop singers Katja Krasavice and Pietro Lombardi. This cover entered at number 2 on the German charts.

== See also ==
- List of European number-one hits of 1985
- List of number-one hits of 1985 (Germany)
- List of number-one singles of the 1980s (Switzerland)
