= Modern Talking =

German pop duo

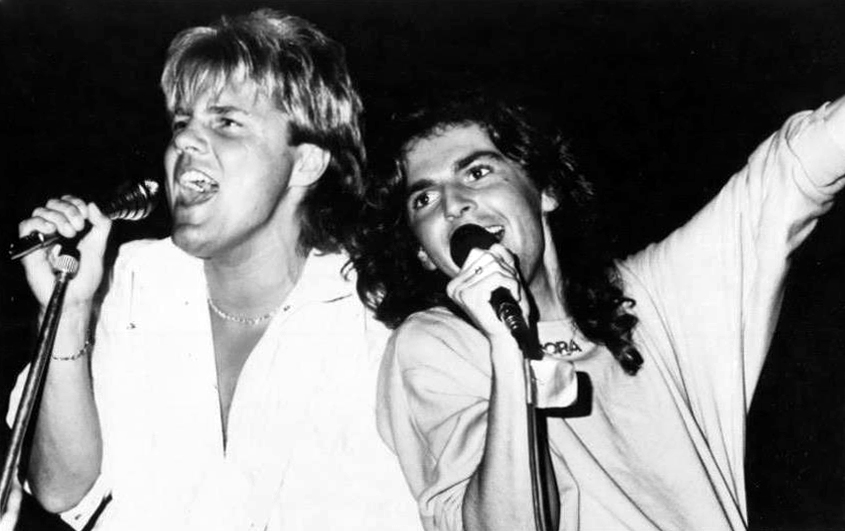
- Modern Talking circa 1985, From left to right: Dieter Bohlen and Thomas Anders

Background information
- Origin: West Berlin
- Genres: Europop; synth-pop; dance-pop; Eurodisco
- Years active: 1983–1987; 1998–2003
- Labels: Hansa; Ariola; RCA; Sony BMG
- Past members: Dieter Bohlen; Thomas Anders

Modern Talking was a German pop duo consisting of arranger, songwriter and producer Dieter Bohlen and singer Thomas Anders. They have been referred to as Germany's most successful pop duo, and have had a number of hit singles, reaching the top 5 in many countries. Their most popular singles are "You're My Heart, You're My Soul", "You Can Win If You Want", "Cheri, Cheri Lady", "Brother Louie", "Atlantis Is Calling (S.O.S. for Love)" and "Geronimo's Cadillac".

Modern Talking worked together from 1983 to 1987, when they disbanded. They made a successful comeback, recording and releasing music again from 1998 to 2003. The duo released singles (many of which involved American rapper Eric Singleton) which again entered the top 10 in Germany and elsewhere, such as "You're My Heart, You're My Soul '98", a remake of the first version of their hit. By the duo's final break-up in 2003, they had reached 120 million of sales worldwide.

== History ==
=== 1983–1987: Beginning ===
Modern Talking's logo since they released their second single, "You Can Win If You Want"

First formed in West Berlin in early 1983, they unexpectedly became popular at the beginning of 1985 with "You're My Heart, You're My Soul", with which they occupied top ten positions in at least 15 countries, including their homeland, where the single peaked at the top of the charts for six consecutive weeks. The single would go on to sell eight million copies worldwide. It was followed by another chart-topping hit, "You Can Win If You Want", which was released in the middle of 1985 off the debut album The 1st Album. The album was certified platinum in Germany for selling over 500,000 units.

Soon after their second hit, Modern Talking released the single "Cheri, Cheri Lady" which also quickly climbed to number one in West Germany, Finland, Greece, Spain, Switzerland, Austria and Norway, and made it into the top ten in Denmark, Belgium, Sweden and the Netherlands. As the sole track released from Let's Talk About Love, it procured that second album's platinum status in West Germany (for sales over 500,000). Success continued with two further number-one singles, "Brother Louie" and "Atlantis Is Calling (S.O.S. for Love)", from the third album, Ready for Romance. The duo also charted high with their sixth single, "Geronimo's Cadillac", from the fourth album, In the Middle of Nowhere, and "Jet Airliner" from their fifth album, Romantic Warriors.

Due to the lacklustre reception accorded the sixth album, Bohlen announced the project's termination in a German interview given while Anders was away in Los Angeles. The two had had a relationship that was quarrelsome, if not tumultuous, and this only worsened the animosity. Bohlen cited Anders' then wife Nora as the main reason for breaking up: she'd forbidden her husband from being interviewed by female reporters and repeatedly demanded major changes to shows, videos and recordings, a fact that Anders would admit to in his biography. After a last phone call, heavily laden with profanity and insults, they broke off all contact for over ten years.

During their early era, Modern Talking knew success in Europe, Asia, South America, the Middle East and Iran. In Britain, they only entered the chart with 4 songs, with "Brother Louie" being their highest at number 4. In 1985, RCA signed Modern Talking for a US deal and released their first album there, but they remained virtually unknown there, and certainly didn't make the US charts.

They released two albums each year from 1985 to 1987, while also promoting their singles on television across Europe, eventually selling 65 million records in three years.

Notably, Modern Talking were one of the first Western bloc bands sale of whose records was allowed in the Soviet Union. After four decades of Cold War censorship and import restrictions, Chairman Mikhail Gorbachev's glasnost reforms in the USSR in 1986 opened up the Soviet sphere to western bands, including Modern Talking at the height of their popularity. As a result, they nurtured a large, enduring fanbase in Eastern Europe.

=== Between 1987 and 1997 ===
Immediately after the duo split in mid-1987, Bohlen formed his own project called Blue System and enjoyed several high chart positions, with tracks like "Sorry Little Sarah", "My Bed Is Too Big", "Under My Skin", "Love Suite", "Laila" and "Déjà vu". Meanwhile, Anders went solo, touring under the name Modern Talking on several continents until the beginning of 1989, when he started to record some of his new pop-like material in Los Angeles and London, as well as Germany. Anders recorded five solo albums in English (Different, Whispers, Down on Sunset, When Will I See You Again and Souled) and one in Spanish - Barcos de Cristal. He was more successful elsewhere than at home, even if he did achieve several hits in Germany. Overcoming past differences, Bohlen and Anders embarked on more amenable relations when Anders moved back to Koblenz, Germany, in 1994.

=== 1998–2003: Reunion ===
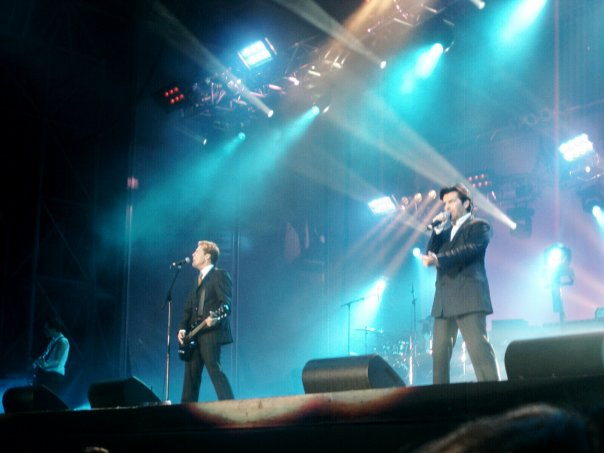
Modern Talking during their final concert in 2003

At the beginning of 1998, the duo got back together, performing in the March on the German TV show Wetten, dass..?. They released a remixed version of their 1984 single "You're My Heart, You're My Soul", featuring Eric Singleton on rap vocals. Their first comeback album Back for Good, which included four new tracks, as well as all of the previous hits remixed with up-to-date techniques, took the number-one spot in 15 countries, occupying Germany's for five consecutive weeks. It would sell three million copies in Europe alone. The duo won Best Selling German Band at the World Music Awards that year. The follow-up album, Alone, also went straight to number one in Germany, and was very successful elsewhere: over one million sales in Europe alone.

Bohlen and Anders followed their 1980s practice of choosing to release two singles from an album. A series of singles and four further albums followed: Year of the Dragon, America, Victory and Universe. In 2003, after chalking up over 400 gold and platinum awards worldwide, Bohlen and Anders disbanded again, just before releasing another best-of compilation. This second break-up was reportedly sparked by Bohlen's negative portrayal of Anders in his autobiography, published 4 October 2003. The period of division between them was one in which Bohlen was involved with Deutschland sucht den Superstar (DSDS), the German edition of the UK's TV talent show Pop Idol. 2003's compilation, entitled The Final Album, contained all of the duo's singles. Thomas Anders relaunched his solo career immediately after the end of Modern Talking, while Bohlen was devoting most of his time to new talent, especially those discovered on DSDS.

== Musical style and production ==
In 1984, Bohlen cited the hit single "Precious Little Diamond" (by Fox the Fox) as his inspiration for using falsetto choruses. The studio vocal line-up of Rolf Köhler, Michael Scholz, Detlef Wiedeke and (on early albums) Birger Corleis, in addition to Bohlen and Anders, produced the high choruses characteristic of Modern Talking. Köhler, Scholz and Wiedeke later went on to work with Bohlen in Blue System, before joining with songwriter Thomas Widrat to form Systems in Blue. Köhler, Scholz and Wiedeke were never credited on the Modern Talking albums, and eventually went to court over the matter. They received an out of court settlement and Bohlen published a sleeve note for his next release (Obsession, by Blue System), acknowledging the trio's contribution.

Further influences include German-language schlager music, disco-pop (the Bee Gees) and romantic English-language songs of Italian and French origin, like Gazebo's "I Like Chopin". After the 1998 reunion, Bohlen produced Eurodance as well as American-style MOR ballads.

Dieter Bohlen also composed for other artists while still in Modern Talking, such as for Chris Norman and Smokie, whose song "Midnight Lady" (1986) remains Bohlen's most popular composition. He also composed a large number of tracks for C. C. Catch, using an accelerated, less-romantic sound. Some English Bohlen songs such as "You're My Heart, You're My Soul" were also recorded with German lyrics by Mary Roos, using the same playback tracks. When Modern Talking disbanded in 1987, a number of tracks written for the last album were re-arranged and then transferred onto Bohlen's first solo album by Blue System. Modern Talking's sixth album was released about the same time as the first single from Blue System, "Sorry Little Sarah", where Bohlen competed on the charts against Modern Talking's "In 100 Years" hit song.

Global sales of Modern Talking when the duo definitively broke up in 2003 stood at 120 million singles and albums combined, making them the biggest-selling German music act in history.

== Post years and legacy ==
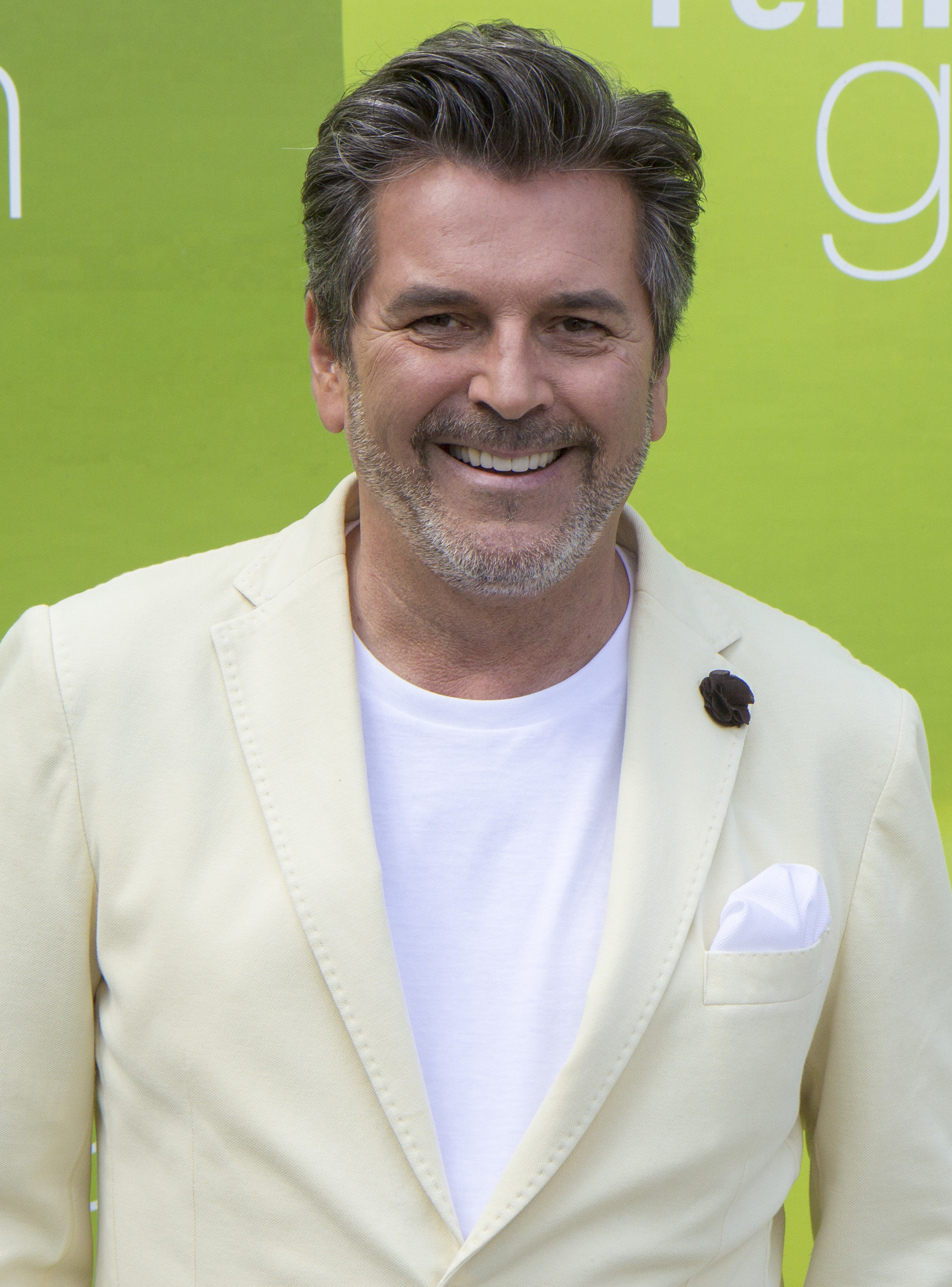
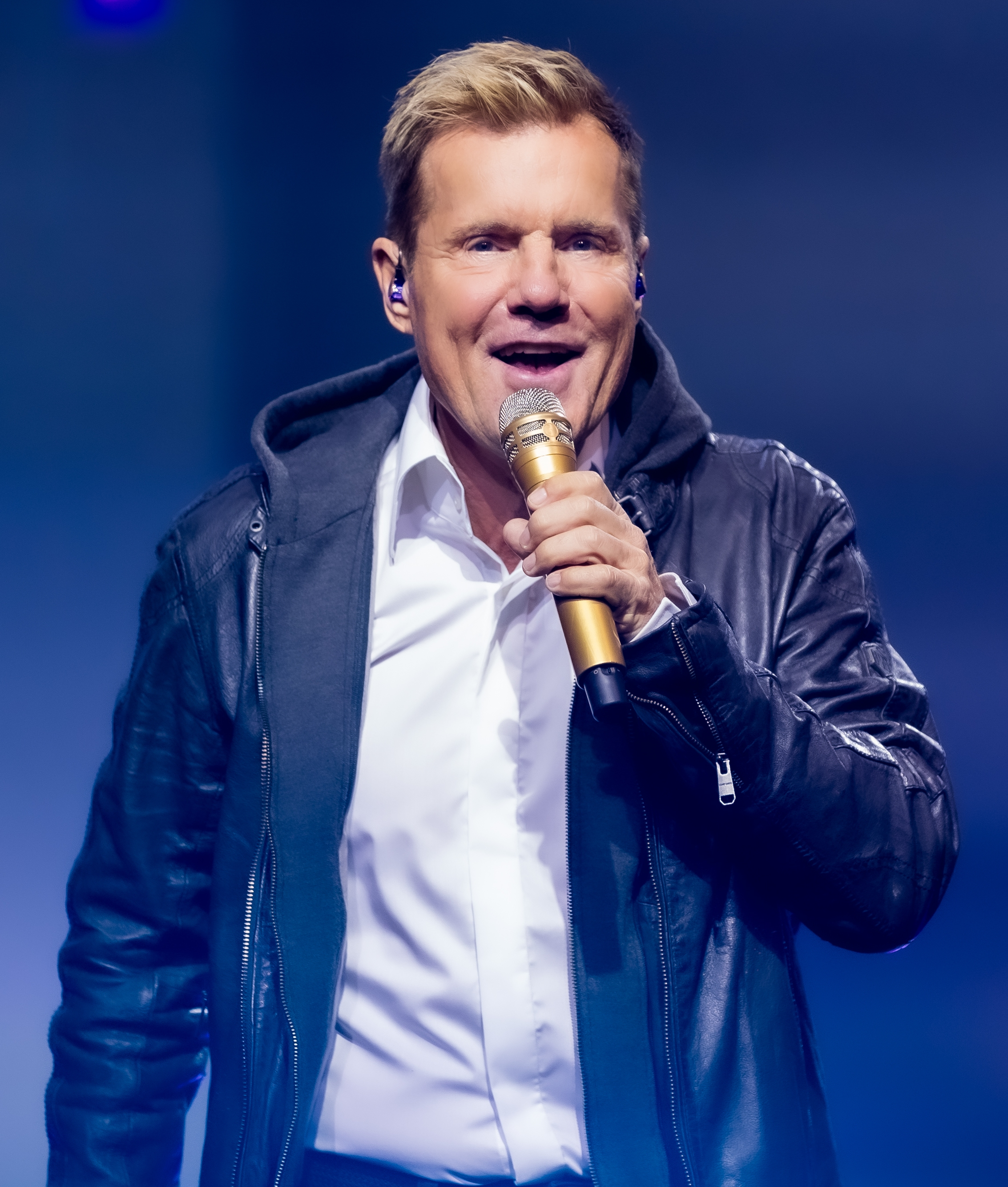
Thomas Anders (left) and Dieter Bohlen in 2019

In 2006, Bohlen included a secret message in his song "Bizarre Bizarre", which, when played backwards, is revealed as: "There will never be an end to Modern Talking." To which was added: "I meant to say that the music of Modern Talking will live forever." Anders has kept the Modern Talking songs in his repertoire and produced songs in a similar vein for his solo records ("Independent Girl"). In 2006, he produced an album Songs Forever of swing and jazz versions of popular songs (including Modern Talking's first hit). Bohlen has written two autobiographical books about Modern Talking's history from his perspective. The first book sold a million copies in Germany. The sequel was heavily criticised for his unfairness towards the people he worked with. As a result of that, Bohlen withdrew from the public for a year until 2006, when he said he regretted putting out the second book. Anders had not been the only one pressing charges against Bohlen and demanding that sections of the book be modified. Frank Farian was also angered by Bohlen's literary output and released a book in which he tried to expose Bohlen as a fraud. Bohlen's first book was the basis of an animated comedy film called Dieter: Der Film. The soundtrack of this film contains a new Modern Talking song "Shooting Star" which had been created using fragments of vocal recordings from previous Modern Talking titles from the "Year of the Dragon" album.

Music critics were unenthusiastic about Modern Talking and gave the band's music and performance lacklustre reviews. Although recognizing the catchiness and professional production of the songs, the lack of originality was criticized by British representatives of these genres of music, such as the Pet Shop Boys or Erasure. In particular, criticism was levelled at the "sameness" among many of their songs, something Bohlen himself conceded to Der Spiegel in 1989:

"I won't in any way deny that Modern Talking hits all have a very, very similar sound. The tracks we've lifted from our LPs as singles have always been those that sound closest to what we did the last time."

— Ich streite gar nicht ab, daß alle Modern-Talking-Hits sehr, sehr ähnlich klingen. Wir haben aus unseren LPs immer diejenigen Titel als Singles ausgekoppelt, die möglichst so klingen wie der Vorgänger.

As of 31 March 2025, the Modern Talking official YouTube channel has had over 4.5 billion views with many music videos being viewed hundreds of millions of times.

== Production roles and collaborators ==
1983–1985	Dieter Bohlen – lead guitar, chorus, producer, composer; Thomas Anders – vocals, piano, keyboards
1985–1987	Dieter Bohlen – lead guitar, chorus, producer, composer; Thomas Anders – vocals, piano, keyboards; Luis Rodríguez – co-producer
1998–2000	Dieter Bohlen – lead guitar, chorus, producer, composer; Thomas Anders – vocals, piano, keyboards; Luis Rodríguez – co-producer; Eric Singleton – rap vocals
2001	Dieter Bohlen – lead guitar, chorus, producer, composer; Thomas Anders – vocals, piano, keyboards; Eric Singleton – rap vocals
2002–2003	Dieter Bohlen – lead guitar, chorus, producer, composer; Thomas Anders – vocals, piano, keyboards

Ralf Stemmann was also one of the producers and can be heard playing the keyboard in their songs, especially in "Cheri Cheri Lady“. He did not get recognition for his work from Bohlen. After the duo broke apart, Anders went on to produce his album "Down on Sunset“ together with Stemmann in California.

Geff Harrison also was a writer for the first two Modern Talking albums. He filed a lawsuit against Bohlen in 1986 after Dieter did not credit him for the work he did for Modern Talking and C. C. Catch.

== Discography ==
=== Studio albums ===
- The 1st Album (1985)
- Let's Talk About Love (1985)
- Ready for Romance (1986)
- In the Middle of Nowhere (1986)
- Romantic Warriors (1987)
- In the Garden of Venus (1987)
- Back for Good (1998)
- Alone (1999)
- Year of the Dragon (2000)
- America (2001)
- Victory (2002)
- Universe (2003)

== Awards and nominations ==
Year	Award	Category	Winner/Nominee	Result
1999	World Music Awards	World's Best Selling German Artist	Back for Good	Won
1999	ECHO Awards	Best National Rock/Pop Group	Back for Good	Won
2000	ECHO Awards	Best National Rock/Pop Group	"Alone"	Nominated
2001	ECHO Awards	Best National Rock/Pop Group	"Year of the Dragon"	Nominated
2002	ECHO Awards	Best National Rock/Pop Group	"America"	Nominated

== See also ==
- Blue System
- Dieter: Der Film
