= Dieter Bohlen =

German songwriter, producer, singer and television personality (born 1954)

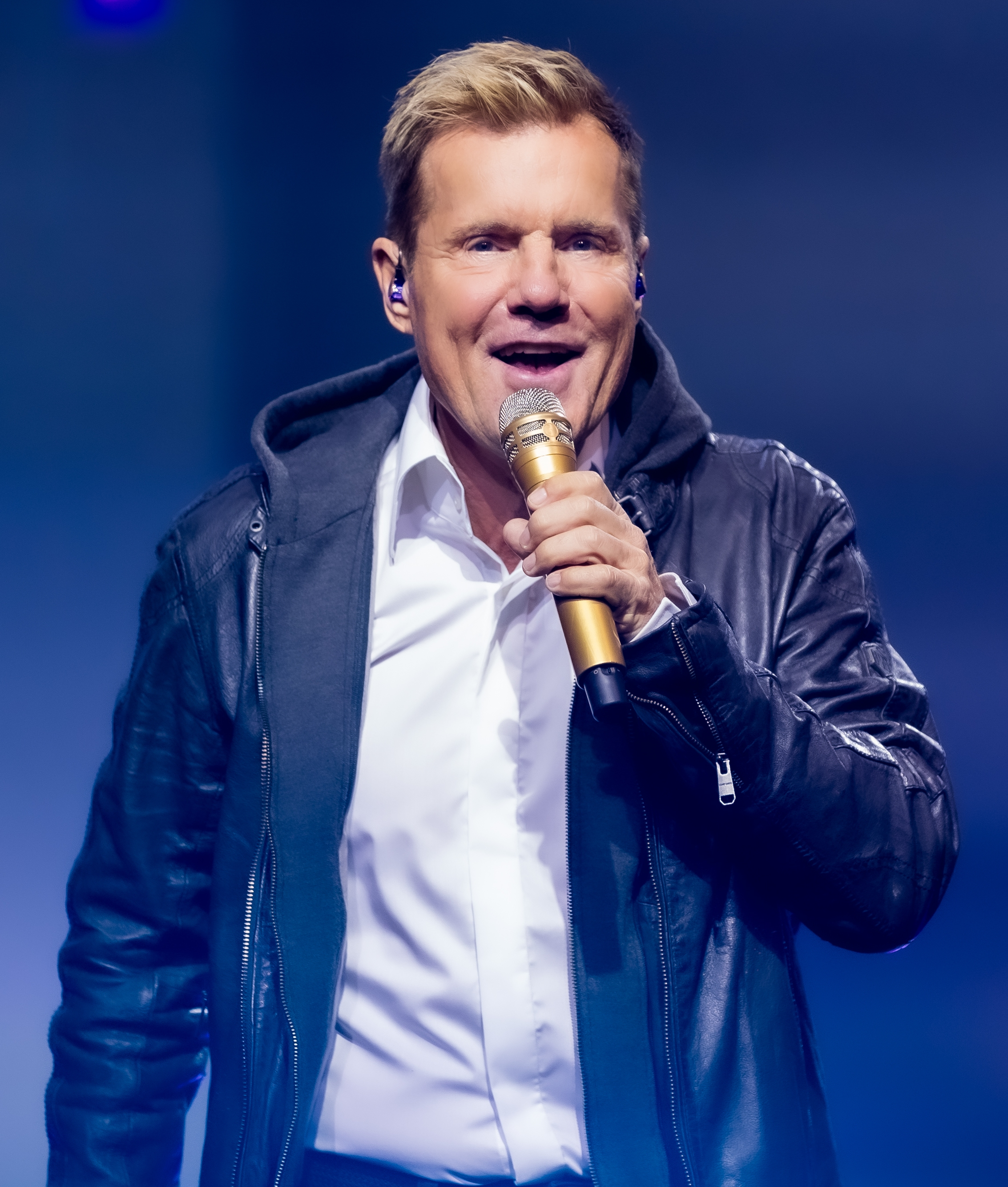
- Bohlen in 2019
- Born: Dieter Günter Bohlen; 7 February 1954 (age 72); Berne, West Germany
- Occupations: Songwriter; producer; singer; television personality
- Years active: 1973–present
- Spouses: Erika Sauerland (m. 1983; div. 1989) Verona Feldbusch (m. 1996; div. 1997) Fatma Carina Walz (m. 2025)
- Partners: Nadja Abd el Farrag (1989–1996; 1997–2001); Estefania Küster (2001–2006)
- Children: 6
- Musical career
- Genres: Pop; Europop; synth-pop; Eurodance; Euro disco; Schlager
- Instruments: Vocals; guitar; keyboards
- Formerly of: Modern Talking; Blue System
- Website: dieterbohlenofficial.com

Dieter Bohlen (German: [ˈdiːtɐ ˈboːlən]; born Dieter Günter Bohlen; 7 February 1954) is a German songwriter, producer, singer and television personality. He first achieved fame as a member of the pop duo Modern Talking in the 1980s, and has since produced numerous German and international artists. He is also a judge on casting shows Deutschland sucht den Superstar and Das Supertalent.

== Life and career ==
=== 1954–1984: Early life and career beginnings ===
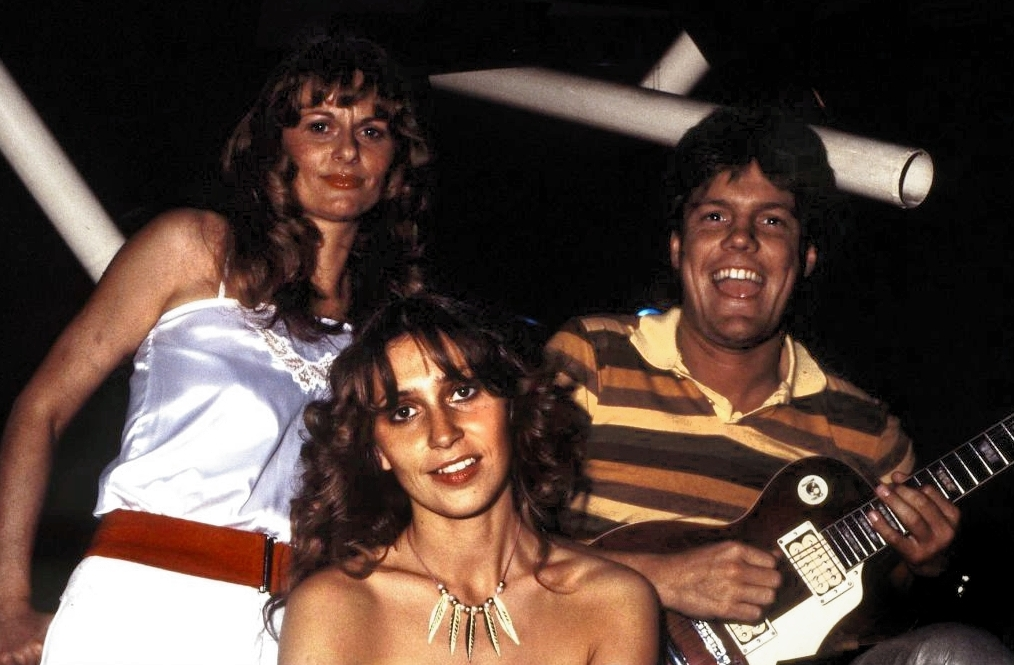
Bohlen (right) with the band Sunday in 1981

Bohlen is the eldest son of building contractor Hans Bohlen (1928–2025) and his wife Edith (born 1936), and grew up in East Frisia. His maternal grandmother is originally from Königsberg. He was named Dieter Günter Bohlen but later expressed dissatisfaction with his second given name and had it officially struck. He has a younger brother named Uwe. The family later moved to Eversten (Oldenburg). In his youth, Bohlen was a member of the Socialist German Workers Youth for a while and shortly of the German Communist Party, though he is not a member of any party nowadays. After getting his Abitur at the Wirtschaftsgymnasium der Berufsbildenden Schulen in Oldenburg-Haarentor, he moved to Göttingen. There, he studied business administration at his parents' request at the Georg-August-Universität, finishing his studies in 1978 with a degree.

Bohlen was still in school when he started writing music. In the late 1970s, he worked as a songwriter at the Hamburg-based label Intersong for numerous Schlager singers. In 1978, he founded the short-lived duo Monza with Holger Garbode. Their first single, "Hallo Taxi Nummer 10", written and produced by Tony Hendrik, was Bohlen's first record and was unsuccessful. Monza released a second single, "Heiße Nacht in der City", a German-language cover of Nick Gilder's "Hot Night in the City", which also was unsuccessful. In 1980, he began working for the Berlin-based label Hansa. That same year, under the pseudonym Steve Benson, he released a solo single in English, "Don't Throw My Love Away". It was followed in 1981 by two other singles under that name, "Love Takes Time" and "(You're A Devil With) Angel Blue Eyes". None of them reached the top 100, which led to the abandonment of the project in 1981. Soon after, he joined the band Sunday, with which he appeared on the ZDF-Hitparade in early 1982 with the song "Halé, hey Louise". The song was covered by artists such as Ricky King. In 1983, in collaboration with Manfred Setzer, Bohlen wrote the song "Mit 17" for Bernd Clüver, which reached the third place of the German pre-selection for the Eurovision Song Contest.

=== 1984–present: Successes as a producer ===
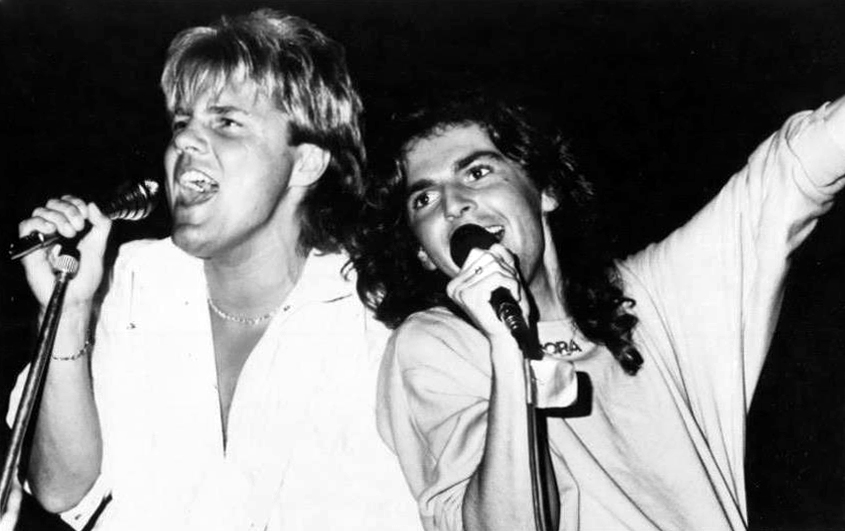
Bohlen (left) and Thomas Anders as Modern Talking in the 1980s

After Bohlen produced six unsuccessful singles in German for Schlager singer Thomas Anders from 1982 to 1984, they founded the pop duo Modern Talking. The band topped the German singles chart five times in a row with "You're My Heart, You're My Soul", "You Can Win If You Want", "Cheri, Cheri Lady", "Brother Louie", and "Atlantis Is Calling (S.O.S. For Love)", and were also successful in other European countries as well as in Asia and Africa. In 1987, the band split up and Bohlen founded his solo project Blue System, which he ended ten years later. He also continued writing and producing for other artists, including C. C. Catch (whom he discovered), Sheree (whom he signed when she was fifteen years old), and boy band Touché.

In 1986, Bohlen wrote the title song "Midnight Lady" of Tatort episode Der Tausch, which was performed by former Smokie singer Chris Norman and was major hit in Central Europe, topping several charts. The song appeared on Norman's second solo album Some Hearts Are Diamonds, which was produced by Bohlen. In 1988, he wrote the title song of Tatort episode Moltke, "Silent Water", which he performed himself as Blue System. In 1989, two songs written and produced by him were sent to the Eurovision Song Contest: Nino de Angelo represented Germany with the song "Flieger" and reached place 14, while Thomas Forstner represented Austria with the song "Nur ein Lied" and reached place 5. Also in 1989, Bohlen wrote the soundtrack to the ZDF series Rivalen der Rennbahn, which was certified platinum in Germany that same year and reached the top 5 in Germany, Austria, and Switzerland.

In 1991, Bohlen produced Roy Black's final album Rosenzeit. From 1991 to 1993, he worked with Bonnie Tyler on the albums Bitterblue, Angel Heart, and Silhouette in Red. The collaboration spawned a number of successful singles, such as "Bitterblue", "Against the Wind" (which was used as the title song of Tatort episode Der Fall Schimanski), and "Fools Lullaby". In 1992, another Bohlen composition represented Austria at the Eurovision Song Contest. Titled "Zusammen geh'n", it was performed by Tony Wegas and reached place 10. In 1998, Modern Talking made a successful comeback, releasing singles such as "You're My Heart, You're My Soul '98, "You Are Not Alone", or Formula One songs "Win the Race" and "Ready for the Victory", but split up again in 2003.

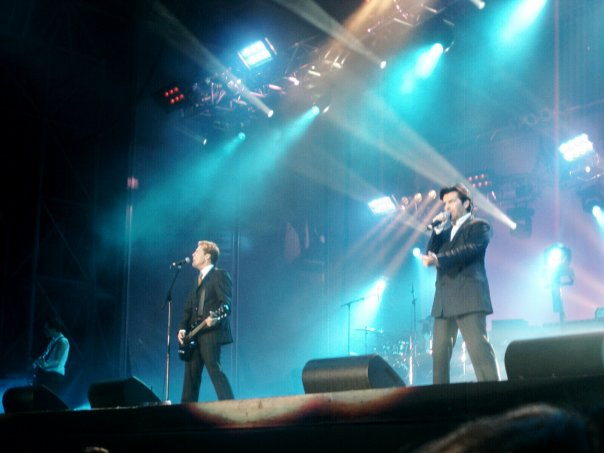
Modern Talking at their final concert in 2003

In 2002, Deutschland sucht den Superstar (often shortened as DSDS), the German version of Pop Idol and American Idol, was launched with Bohlen as one of the judges. While the other judges are changed regularly, he has been a judge each season. He has produced most of the winners, yielding several hits such as "We Have a Dream". That same year, he published his first book, an autobiography titled Nichts als die Wahrheit, written in collaboration with Bild journalist Katja Kessler, which sold over a million copies in Germany and got a Goldene Feder. A second autobiography written with Kessler, Hinter den Kulissen, was published the next year. It was criticised for its unfairness and charges were pressed by his former bandmate Thomas Anders. Frank Farian published the book Stupid Dieser Bohlen: Die Wahrheit und nichts als die Wahrheit über den Pop-Hochstapler as a response, in which he tried to expose Bohlen as a fraud. Both Nichts als die Wahrheit and Hinter den Kulissen were also released as audiobooks read by Bohlen. In 2004, he won the ECHO for Producer of the Year, while "We Have a Dream" earned the ECHO for Rock/Pop Single of the Year (National).

In March 2006, Dieter: Der Film, a satirical cartoon film based on Nichts als die Wahrheit, premiered. Bohlen did not voice his own role, but voiced the narrator. He wrote and produced the entirety of the film's soundtrack, which includes the previously unreleased Modern Talking song "Shooting Star". Later that year, he produced the song "Be My Boyfriend" for the duo Indiggo, which reached the seventh place of the Romanian pre-selection for the Eurovision Song Contest 2006. Also in 2006, he published his third book, Meine Hammer-Sprüche.

In 2007, the German installment of the Got Talent franchise, Das Supertalent, was launched with Bohlen as one of the judges. Similarly to Deutschland sucht den Superstar, the fellow judges are changed regularly but he has been a judge each season. In 2008, he published two more books, Nur die Harten kommen in den Garten! Der Weg zum Superstar and Der Bohlenweg: Planieren statt Sanieren.

In 2010, Bohlen began working with Schlager singer Andrea Berg. All of her albums produced by him—Schwerelos, Abenteuer, Atlantis, and Seelenbeben—topped the German and Austrian album charts. He ended their collaboration per email on 17 March 2018. On 3 April 2019, Bohlen and Berg announced they would publish two new songs together.

== Artistry ==
Bohlen's productions are characterised by simply structured compositions. In the 1980s and 1990s, often working in the studio with Spanish producer Luis Rodríguez, he produced Euro disco and Eurodance songs for Modern Talking, Blue System, and C. C. Catch with falsetto choruses. Those choruses were achieved with the help of session singers, such as Rolf Köhler, Michael Scholz, and Detlef Wiedeke. With Deutschland sucht den Superstar winners, Bohlen tends to focus on pop ballads.

Copyright expert Paul Hertin from Berlin repeatedly claimed that Bohlen plagiarized several songs and thus breached copyright. For example, Hertin says that Bohlen used the melody of Babyface's "What If" for the production of Yvonne Catterfeld's "Für dich". Based on Hertin's expert assessment regarding the plagiarism allegations, the Berlin prosecutor's office initiated a preliminary investigation against Bohlen, which was dropped.

== Other ventures ==
=== Casting shows ===
Bohlen has been on Deutschland sucht den Superstar, the German version of Pop Idol and American Idol, since the show was launched in 2002. He often makes blunt and controversial comments, including insults and wisecracks about contestants and their singing abilities (such as "You sing like a garden gnome on ecstasy" or "Your voice sounds like Kermit getting his arse kicked"), which led to comparisons with Simon Cowell in the German-speaking press. He earns 1.2 million euros per season. He has worked with most of the winners and occasionally with other candidates, such as first season third-placer Daniel Küblböck, yielding several major hits. Since the show was launched in 2007, Bohlen has also been a judge on Das Supertalent, the German installment of the Got Talent franchise, being the only judge to have been on every season.

=== Products and endorsements ===
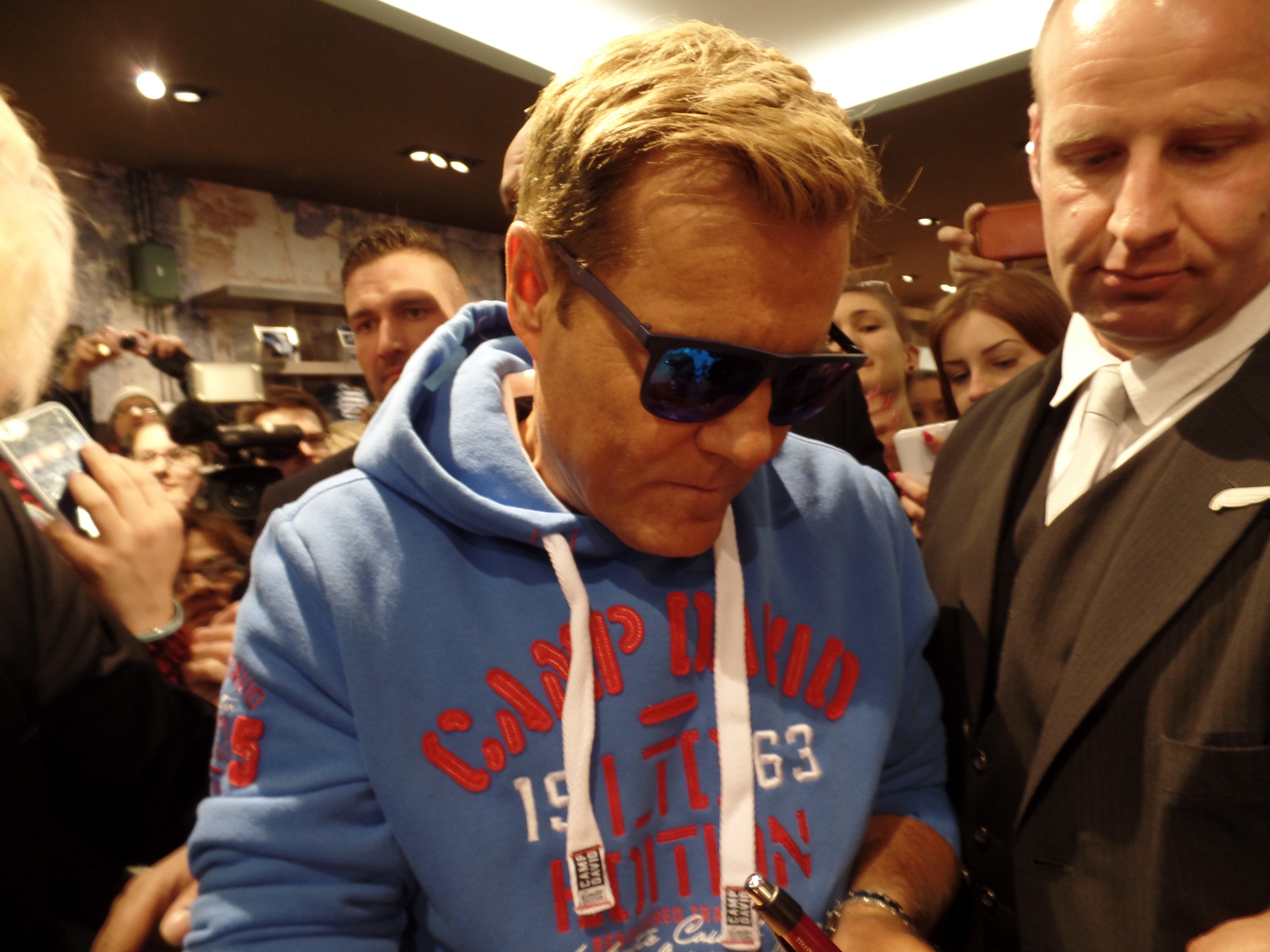
Bohlen signing autographs while attending a Camp David store opening in Oldenburg in April 2016

Bohlen has signed numerous advertising deals with companies such as Müller Milch, Makro Markt, S.Oliver, O_{2}, Roller (Möbelhaus), Wiesenhof, the Deutsche Bahn, and Unilever. He has been a longtime advertising partner of Camp David. In 2020, he had been the face of Camp David for 10 years.

Between 2002 and 2008, Bohlen published five books, ranging from autobiographies to advice books. In 2005, he released a perfume named Provocation. In 2011, he founded the clothing label "Needs Clothing" along with Felix Werner. In 2013, he released a line of wallpapers through P+S.

== Personal life ==
From 1983 to 1989, Bohlen was married to Erika Sauerland, whom he had met in 1974 in Göttingen. They have three children: Marc, Marvin, and Marielin. From 1989 to 1996, he was in a relationship with television personality and singer Nadja Abd el Farrag, also known under the stage name Naddel. On 13 May 1996, Bohlen married model Verona Feldbusch in Las Vegas, but they separated after four weeks. The divorce was finalised on 27 May 1997. From 1997 to 2001, he was in a relationship with Abd el Farrag again.

From 2001 to 2006, Bohlen lived with model and dancer Estefania Küster. Their son Maurice Cassian was born on 7 July 2005. Since 2006, he has been in a relationship with Fatma Carina Walz, whom he met in Mallorca, Spain, where one of the casting events for Deutschland sucht den Superstar was held. They have a daughter named Amelie (born 22 March 2011) and a son named Maximilian (born 7 September 2013). Bohlen and Walz were married on 31 December 2025 in the Maldives.

Bohlen lives in the village of Tötensen near Hamburg. He is left-handed, but was forced to learn how to write with his right hand at grammar school. He plays tennis with his left hand because he started tennis after leaving school. According to an article by the Manager Magazine in 2018, Bohlen has a net worth of €250 million, putting him amongst the thousand richest Germans.

=== Political views ===
Over the course of his career, Bohlen has frequently expressed his political opinions. In November 2024, ahead of the 2025 German federal election, he offered to become an advisor to the next chancellor, comparing it to Elon Musk's role advising Donald Trump. The following month, Friedrich Merz, at the time a candidate, said that he had a phone call with Bohlen but was not considering giving him a position.

Bohlen's views on the 2022 Russian invasion of Ukraine and associated sanctions have repeatedly sparked controversy. In October 2022, his criticism of the sanctions prompted condemnation from various politicians and cultural figures such as Saskia Esken of the SPD and Ukrainian former boxer Wladimir Klitschko but also praise from Alternative for Germany co-leader Tino Chrupalla. Bohlen responded that he had been calling for de-escalation and that it was "wrong" to ascribe him support for the war or Vladimir Putin.

In March 2026, Lithuanian National Radio and Television (LRT) reported that two Bohlen concerts in the country had been cancelled over a November 2025 interview in which he called Germany and Russia a "dream team". However, he said in a social media video that he was referring to Germany–Russia relations prior to the invasion and that no concerts were planned in Lithuania.

In June 2026, Bohlen stated that a Ukraine victory against Russia would be the "worst-case scenario", as he feared Russian President Vladimir Putin would not accept defeat and use nuclear weapons. However, he also expressed doubt that Russia would target Germany.

== Discography ==
=== Solo releases ===
==== Albums ====
Title	Charts positions				
Title	GER	AUT	SWI	PL	iTunes
Dieter: Der Film soundtrack (2006)	13	—	—	—	—
Dreamcatcher feat. Mark Medlock (2007)	2	6	14	—	—
Das Mega Album! (2019)	4	7	9	46	1

==== Singles ====
Title	Charts positions				
Title	GER	AUT	SWI	FI	iTunes
"You Can Get It" feat. Mark Medlock (2007)	1	3	3	20	-
"Unbelievable" feat. Mark Medlock (2007)	4	19	27	-	-

=== No. 1 hits in West Germany/Germany ===
Year	Title	Artist
1985	"You're My Heart, You're My Soul"	Modern Talking
1985	"You Can Win If You Want"	Modern Talking
1985	"Cheri, Cheri Lady"	Modern Talking
1986	"Brother Louie"	Modern Talking
1986	"Midnight Lady"	Chris Norman
1986	"Atlantis Is Calling (S.O.S. for Love)"	Modern Talking
2003	"We Have a Dream"	DSDS
2003	"Take Me Tonight"	Alexander Klaws
2003	"Free Like the Wind"	Alexander Klaws
2003	"You Drive Me Crazy"	Daniel Küblböck
2003	"Für dich"	Yvonne Catterfeld
2004	"Du hast mein Herz gebrochen"	Yvonne Catterfeld
2007	"Now or Never"	Mark Medlock
2007	"You Can Get It"	Mark Medlock
2008	"Summer Love"	Mark Medlock
2009	"Anything but Love"	Daniel Schuhmacher
2010	"Don't Believe"	Mehrzad Marashi
2011	"Call My Name"	Pietro Lombardi
2012	"Don't Think About Me"	Luca Hänni
2013	"Mein Herz"	Beatrice Egli
2016	"Glücksmoment"	Prince Damien
2019	"Cherry Lady"	Capital Bra
2020	"Eine Nacht"	Ramon Roselly

== Awards ==
- 1985: Goldene Stimmgabel, Most successful composer and producer
- 1998: VIVA Comet – Lifetime Achievement Award
- 2001: Top of the Pops Award, Top Artist Germany
- 2003: German Book Prize, Second according to the public audience
- 2003: Goldene Feder
- 2003: Media Control Award, 25 Jahre Media Control
- 2003: GQ Man of the Year
- 2003: Unsere Besten, position No. 30 as the greatest German ever
- 2003: Bambi, Pop National
- 2004: Echo, best national producer
- 2004: Echo, Single of the year We have a dream
- 2008: Platin-Otto, Lifetime achievement award

== Literature ==
=== By Dieter Bohlen ===
- Dieter Bohlen, Katja Kessler: Nichts als die Wahrheit, Heyne, Munich 2002, ISBN 3-453-86143-4
- Dieter Bohlen, Katja Kessler: Hinter den Kulissen, Blanvalet, Munich 2003, ISBN 3-89830-698-4
- Dieter Bohlen: Meine Hammer-Sprüche, Heyne, Munich 2006, ISBN 3-453-60045-2
- Dieter Bohlen: Nur die Harten kommen in den Garten! Der Weg zum Superstar, Heyne, Munich 2008, ISBN 978-3-453-60101-7
- Dieter Bohlen: Der Bohlenweg – Planieren statt Sanieren, Heyne 2008, ISBN 978-3-453-15535-0; also as audio by Random House Audio, spoken by Bohlen, ISBN 978-3-86604-965-9

=== About Dieter Bohlen ===
- Frank Farian, Reginald Rudorf, Dieter Kaltwasser – Stupid Dieser Bohlen. Die Wahrheit und nichts als die Wahrheit über den Pop-Hochstapler, Franks Kleiner Buchverlag, Berlin 2004, ISBN 3-9809531-0-6
