= Luis Rodríguez (producer) =

Spanish music producer (born 1948)

- Born: 1948 (age 77–78); Fuente el Fresno, Ciudad Real, Spain
- Genre: Synthpop
- Occupation: Record producer
- Years active: 1979–present
- Label: BMG

Luis Rodríguez Salazar (born 1948) is a Spanish music producer, arranger, mixer and engineer, known for his role in the co-production of German pop duo Modern Talking. He was also involved up to the 1990s in most of Dieter Bohlen's productions, including C. C. Catch and Blue System, working as co-producer.

== Biography ==
Rodriguez was born in Fuente el Fresno, Ciudad Real, Spain in 1948. He started at age 12 playing the guitar and playing in the streets. He started as bassist and guitarist in the band Los Esclavos, performing at a flamenco club in Hamburg. When he started to sing he experimented with 2 microphones, one dry without effects and one with delay and echo. He would do 2-track recordings from the age of 17. He got a gig as DJ and was able to buy an 8-track and make more demos. He went to school to become a music technician. He became a singer in the mid-1970s, creating his own recording studio in Hamburg called Star 33. He met Dieter Bohlen of Modern Talking and started working with him, this is when his career took off. He stated in an interview that Dieter came to him to ask if he had an idea for the song You're My Heart, You're My Soul. Luis gave him a groove for the song that did not exist back then and suggested that Thomas Anders should sing.

Rodriguez produced or co-produced for such artists as C. C. Catch, Blue System, Chris Norman (ex-Smokie), Bonnie Tyler, Falco, London Boys, New Baccara, Sabrina, Fancy and others. In the 1980s, he worked on numerous projects like New Baccara, Mike Mareen, Chicano, T. Ark, Sweet Connection, among others. He had big success as producer with the music project Fun Factory.

It is believed that the Modern Talking song "Brother Louie", was written by Dieter Bohlen about Rodriguez, as he was a close associate of Bohlen.

Using the vocals of his wife Lian Ross, Rodríguez produced some dance projects such as Creative Connection, Josy, Jobel, and Dana Harris.
