= Hansa Records =

Defunct German record label

- Parent company: Sony Music Entertainment
- Founded: 1962; 64 years ago (original); 2023; 3 years ago (relaunch)
- Defunct: 2009 (original)
- Distributors: Self-distributed (1972–1979); Ariola Records (1979–1987); Bertelsmann Music Group (1987–2002); Sony BMG (2002–2008); Sony Music Entertainment (2008–2009, 2023–present)
- Genre: Various
- Country of origin: Germany

Hansa Records (also known as Hansa, Hansa Musik Produktion or Hansa International) is a German record label owned by Sony Music Entertainment. It was founded in 1962 and is based in Berlin.

== History ==
In the early 1960s, brothers Peter and Thomas Meisel, grandchildren of Will Meisel, who was the founder of German music publisher Edition Meisel & Co. GmbH, assumed responsibility of the family's publishing company upon their grandfather's retirement, and founded Hansa Musik Produktion company and the Hansa record label in 1962. The label's name (and the name of the related recording studio) was inspired by the Hanseatic League, a medieval Northern European maritime trade network.

Initially, the label focused on German artists and Schlager music, later finding commercial success with artists such as Frank Farian's Boney M., Amii Stewart, Aneka, Modern Talking, Milli Vanilli, and others.

In 1977, the label signed an early lineup of the Cure (known at that time as Easy Cure), but was not happy with the band's demos and refused to release "Killing an Arab", suggesting that the band record cover songs instead. The band refused, and Hansa dropped them.

In the mid-1980s, after a decline in sales both domestically and internationally, Hansa Records was eventually purchased by Bertelsmann Music Group, who merged them with several other labels like Ariola-Eurodisc to form BMG Berlin Musik GmbH/BMG-Ariola, later to become part of international conglomerate Sony Music Entertainment, under which it was phased out in 2009. It was used only for reissues of its previous releases until its reactivation in 2023 when Sony Music's German labels revamped.

== Recording studios ==
When it became difficult for Hansa to book sufficient recording studio time at the Ariola-Eurodisc studio to keep up with their growing production schedule, the Meisel brothers built Hansa Studio One in Tiergarten in West Berlin. In 1972, the Meisel brothers acquired Ariola's historic building at Köthener Strasse 38, home of the historic Meistersaal concert hall, naming it Hansa Tonstudio Two. Initially intended to record only Hansa Records projects, Hansa's studios gradually started booking non-Hansa clients, most notably Iggy Pop and David Bowie, who in 1977 recorded their respective albums Lust for Life and Low at the studio. In the late 1970s they closed the first studio and consolidated operations to the second, simplify referring to it as Hansa Tonstudio. The Meisel family retained ownership of Hansa Tonstudio, who run it as part of the Meisel Music group.

== Selected list of Hansa label artists ==
- Angletrax
- Blue System
- Boney M.
- C. C. Catch
- Child
- Chilly
- Eruption
- Gilla
- Giorgio Moroder (1969–1972)
- Japan (1978–1979)
- La Mama
- Les McKeown
- Liz Mitchell
- Milli Vanilli
- M.C. Sar & the Real McCoy
- Modern Talking
- Die Prinzen
- Amii Stewart (1979–1981)
- The Twins

== Selected list of Hansa label releases (by year) ==
The original 7 inch label of one of the best selling Hansa Records singles, Boney M.'s "Rivers of Babylon"

- The Action: "Harlem Shuffle" / "Wasn't It You" (1968)
- Xhol Caravan: Electrip (1969)
- Boney M.: Take the Heat off Me (1976)
- Boney M.: Love for Sale (1977)
- Boney M.: Nightflight to Venus (1978)
- Sugar Cane: "Montego Bay" (1978)
- Boney M.: Oceans of Fantasy (1979)
- Japan: Quiet Life (1979)
- New Celeste: On the Line (1979)
- Amii Stewart: Knock on Wood (1979)
- Nick Nicely: "DCT Dreams" (1980)
- Viola Wills: "If You Could Read My Mind" (1980)
- Aneka: "Japanese Boy" (1981)
- The Twins: "Ballet Dancer" (1984)
- Modern Talking: The 1st Album (1985)
- Modern Talking: Let's Talk About Love (1985)
- C. C. Catch: Catch the Catch (1986)
- Chris Norman: Some Hearts Are Diamonds (1986)
- Modern Talking: Ready for Romance (1986)
- Modern Talking: In the Middle of Nowhere (1986)
- Milli Vanilli: All or Nothing (1988)
- John Parr: "Westward Ho" (1990)
- Bonnie Tyler: Bitterblue (1991)
- The Catch featuring Don Snow: 25 Years – The Album (1991)
- Bonnie Tyler: Angel Heart (1992)
- Bonnie Tyler: Silhouette in Red (1993)
- M.C. Sar & the Real McCoy: "Another Night" (1993)
- Modern Talking: Back for Good (1998)
- Modern Talking: Alone (1999)

== See also ==
- List of record labels
