= Déjà vu (disambiguation) =

Déjà vu, a French phrase meaning "already seen", refers to the experience of feeling sure that one has witnessed or experienced a new situation previously.

Déjà vu or Déjà Vu may also refer to:

== Music ==
=== Groups ===
- Deja Vu (group), a British-Venezuelan girl group
- Deja Vu, a 1980s Japanese progressive rock band formed by Motoi Sakuraba

=== Albums ===
- Deià...Vu, by Kevin Ayers, 1984
- Déjà vu (Blue System album) or the title song (see below), 1991
- Déjà Vu (CNCO album), 2021
- Déjà Vu (Crosby, Stills, Nash & Young album) or the title song, 1970
- Déjà Vu (George Duke album), 2010
- Déjà Vu (Giorgio Moroder album) or the title song (see below), 2015
- Déjà-vu (Hitomi album) or the title song, 1997
- Dejavu (Koda Kumi album), 2011
- Déjà-Vu (Metrô album) or the title song, 2002
- Déjà-Vu (Will album), 2000
- Deja Vu, by Mike Singer, or the title song, 2018
- Deja Vu, by Willie Colón, 1978

=== EPs ===
- Déjà Vu (SS501 EP) or the title song, 2006
- Deja Vu, by Sonamoo, or the title song, 2014

=== Songs ===
- "Déjà Vu" (3OH!3 song), 2010
- "Deja Vu" (A.B.'s song), 1984
- "Déjà Vu" (Beyoncé song), 2006
- "Déjà vu" (Blue System song), 1991
- "Déjà Vu" (Bob Taylor and Inna song), 2009
- "Deja Vu" (Coterie song), 2022
- "Déjà Vu" (Dionne Warwick song), 1979
- "Déjà Vu" (Giorgio Moroder song), 2015
- "Deja Vu" (J. Cole song), 2016
- "Deja Vu" (Olivia Rodrigo song), 2021
- "Deja Vu" (Post Malone song), 2016
- "Deja Vu" (Prince Royce and Shakira song), 2017
- "Déjà Vu" (Roger Waters song), 2017
- "Déjà Vu" (Something for Kate song), 2003
- "Deja Vu (All Over Again)", by John Fogerty, 2004
- "Deja Vu (Uptown Baby)", by Lord Tariq and Peter Gunz, 1997
- "Dejavu", by Apink from Pink Memory, 2015
- "Deja Vu", by Ateez from Zero: Fever Part.3, 2021
- "Déjà Vu", by Avril Lavigne from Love Sux, 2022
- "Déjà Vu", by Bear Hands from You'll Pay for This, 2016
- "Déjà Vu", by the Bee Gees from This Is Where I Came In, 2001
- "Déjà Vu", by Blessthefall from Hollow Bodies, 2013
- "Déjà Vu", by Cibo Matto from Hotel Valentine, 2014
- "Déjà Vu", by Coldrain from Final Destination, 2009
- "Deja Vu", by Dave Rodgers, 1999
- "Déjà Vu", by Dog Fashion Disco from Committed to a Bright Future, 2003
- "Deja Vu", by Dreamcatcher, 2019
- "Déjà Vu", by Eminem from Relapse, 2009
- "Deja Vu", by En Vogue from Electric Café, 2018
- "Déjà Vu", by Enigma from Seven Lives Many Faces, 2008
- "Deja Vu", by f(x) from 4 Walls, 2015
- "Déjà Vu", by Gorillaz, featuring Alicai Harley, from Meanwhile EP, 2021
- "Déjà Vu", by Gustavo Cerati from Fuerza natural, 2009
- "Déjà Vu", by Iron Maiden from Somewhere in Time, 1986
- "Deja Vu", by James Arthur from It'll All Make Sense in the End, 2021
- "Déjà Vu", by Katy Perry from Witness, 2017
- "Deja Vu", by Killah Priest from Black August, 2003
- "Deja Vu", by Lauren Duski, performing on season 12 of The Voice (U.S.), 2017
- "Deja Vu", by Luna Sea from Image, 1992
- "Déjà Vu", by Mike Posner from 31 Minutes to Takeoff, 2010
- "Deja Vu", by Monsta X from The Code, 2017
- "Déjà Vu", by NCT Dream from NCT 2020 Resonance, 2020
- "Dejavu", by NU'EST W from Who, You, 2018
- "Déjà Vu", by Pitty from Anacrônico, 2005
- "Deja Vu", by Pixy from Reborn, 2022
- "Deja Vu", by Roc Project, 2004
- "Déjà Vu", by Sleeping with Sirens from Feel, 2013
- "Déjà Vu", by Steve Hackett from Genesis Revisited, 1996
- "Deja-Vu", by T-ara from Treasure Box, 2013
- "Deja Vu", by Taemin from Eternal, 2024
- "Deja Vu", by Tainy and Yandel, 2021
- "Déjà Vu", by Twenty88 from Twenty88, 2016
- "Dejavu", by Twice from What Is Love?, 2018
- "Deja Vu", by TXT from Minisode 3: Tomorrow, 2024
- "Deja Vu", by Velvet from The Queen, 2008
- "Deja-vu", by Yeah Yeah Yeahs from Show Your Bones, 2006
- "Deja Vu", by Yngwie Malmsteen from Odyssey, 1988
- "Deja Vu", by Zion I from Enter the Woods, 1997
- "Déjà Vu (I've Been Here Before)", by Teena Marie from Wild and Peaceful, 1979
- "Take Me Back (Déjà Vu)", by Van Halen from Balance, 1995

== Computing ==
- Déjà Vu (software), a program for computer-assisted translation
- Déjà Vu (video game), a 1985 adventure game for the Macintosh
  - Déjà Vu II: Lost in Las Vegas, a 1988 sequel to the above
- DejaVu fonts, a typeface family

== Film ==
- Déjà Vu (1985 film), a British motion picture starring Jaclyn Smith
- Deja Vu (1990 film), a Soviet-Polish comedy starring Jerzy Stuhr
- Déjà Vu (1997 film), an American film directed by Henry Jaglom
- Déjà vu (2001 film), a British-Indian film by Biju Viswanath
- Déjà Vu (2006 film), an American science fiction action film starring Denzel Washington
- Déjà Vu (2015 film), a Chinese comedy
- Deja Vu, a 2021 Indian Hindi-language film directed by Abhijeet Mohan Warang
- Dejavu (2022 film), an Indian Tamil-language mystery thriller

== Television ==
- Deja Vu (TV series), a Taiwan TV series
- "Deja Vu" (The Outer Limits), a 1999 episode of The Outer Limits
- "Deja-vu", a 2020 episode of Dark
- "Déjà Vu" (Code Lyoko episode)
- "Déjà Vu (or: Show 5)", an episode of Monty Python's Flying Circus

== Plays ==
- Déjàvu, a 1992 stage play by John Osborne
- Déjà Vu, a 2009 radio play by Alexis Zegerman, directed by Lu Kemp

== Other uses ==
- Déjà Vu (radio personality), radio personality and motivational speaker
- Déjà Vu (company), a U.S. company that owns strip clubs
- Déjà Vu, Giant Inverted Boomerang roller coasters by Vekoma

== See also ==
- Deja (disambiguation)
- Deja Voodoo (disambiguation)
- Deja vous (disambiguation)
- Deja Vu All Over Again (disambiguation)
- DejaView, a Canadian television channel
- DjVu, a file format for storing images
