= Obsession (Blue System album) =

Studio album by Blue System
- Released: 8 October 1990
- Recorded: October 1989 – July 1990
- Genre: Europop
- Length: 37:16
- Label: BMG
- Producer: Dieter Bohlen; Luis Rodríguez

Blue System chronology
Twilight (1989)	Obsession (1990)	Seeds of Heaven (1991)

Obsession is the fourth album of Blue System. It was published in 1990 by BMG Ariola and produced by Dieter Bohlen. The album contains 10 new tracks.

== Track listing ==
1. "Love Is Such a Lonely Sword" (feat. Audrey Motaung) – 4:10
2. "When Sarah Smiles" – 3:41
3. "Behind the Silence" – 3:32
4. "2000 Miles" – 3:46
5. "Two Hearts Beat as One" – 3:48
6. "48 Hours" – 3:54
7. "I'm Not That Kind of Guy" – 3:27
8. "Try the Impossible" – 3:24
9. "Another Lonely Night" – 3:09
10. "I'm the Pilot of Your Love" – 3:21

== Personnel ==
- Dieter Bohlen – lead vocals, producer, arranger, lyrics
- Rolf Köhler – refrain vocals, chorus falsetto
- Detlef Wiedeke – chorus falsetto
- Michael Scholz – chorus falsetto
- Luis Rodríguez – co-producer, engineering

== Charts ==
Chart (1990)	Peak position
Austrian Albums (Ö3 Austria)	18
German Albums (Offizielle Top 100)	14
