= Dr. No (song) =

2008 single by Systems in Blue

Single by Systems in Blue

from the album Out of the Blue
- Released: February 19, 2008
- Recorded: 2007
- Length: 3:30 (radio version)
- Label: Universal
- Songwriter(s): Rolf Köhler; Michael Scholz; Detlef Wiedeke; Thomas Widrat
- Producer(s): Michael Scholz; Detlef Wiedeke; Thomas Widrat

Systems in Blue singles chronology
"Voodoo Queen" (2007)	"Dr. No" (2008)	"Jeannie Moviestar" (2008)

"Dr. No" is a song released by German music group Systems in Blue. The song was released as a single on February 19, 2008, and was produced by Michael Scholz, Detlef Wiedeke and Thomas Widrat. It was the first single released by the group since Rolf Köhler's (lead singer) death.

== Background ==
The song was produced by Systems in Blue and Thomas Widrat. The song was recorded in 2007, and it was going to be released the same year. However, the lead singer of the group Rolf Köhler died suddenly on September 16, postponing the single's and "Out of the Blue"'s release.

The song was released on February 19, 2008.

== Track listing ==
CD single

1. "Dr. No" (Radio Edit) - 3:30
2. "Dr. No" (Maxi Version) - 6:03
3. "Dr. No" (Instrumental Version) - 3:30

== Charts ==
Chart (2008)	Peak position
European Hi-NRG Dance Hits Chart	1

== Personnel ==
- Music and lyrics by Rolf Köhler, Michael Scholz, Detlef Wiedeke and Thomas Widrat.
- Mastered by Detlef Wiedeke
- Published by Spectre Media, Germany
