= Walking on a Rainbow =

Studio album by Blue System
- Released: 2 November 1987
- Genre: Pop; Euro disco
- Length: 35:50
- Label: Hansa
- Producer: Dieter Bohlen; Luis Rodríguez

Blue System chronology
Walking on a Rainbow (1987)	Body Heat (1988)

Walking on a Rainbow is the debut album by group Blue System, released on 2 November 1987 by Hansa Records. Its only single is "Sorry, Little Sarah", which peaked at number 14 on the German charts.

== Track listing ==
1. "Gangster Love" (maxi version) – 4:24
2. "Sorry, Little Sarah" (maxi version) – 5:12
3. "She's a Lady" (maxi version) – 4:59
4. "Voodoo Nights" – 3:23
5. "Love Me More" (maxi version) – 4:57
6. "Emanuelle" (maxi version) – 4:19
7. "Big Boys Don't Cry" (maxi version) – 5:05
8. "G.T.O." – 3:28

== Personnel ==
- Dieter Bohlen – lead vocals, refrain vocals (1, 6, 7), producer, arranger, lyrics
- Rolf Köhler – refrain vocals, chorus
- Detlef Wiedeke – chorus
- Michael Scholz – chorus
- Luis Rodríguez – co-producer, engineering
