= Body Heat (Blue System album) =

Studio album by Blue System
- Released: 17 October 1988
- Genre: Synth-pop
- Length: 36:44
- Label: Hansa
- Producer: Dieter Bohlen; Luis Rodríguez

Blue System chronology
Walking on a Rainbow (1987)	Body Heat (1988)	Twilight (1989)

Body Heat is the second album by German music group Blue System, released in 1988.

There were 4 single releases from this album: "My Bed Is Too Big" was released in April 1988, "Under My Skin" in October 1988, "Silent Water" in December 1988 and "Love Suite" (remix '89) in April 1989.

== Track listing ==
1. "Under My Skin" – 3:31
2. "Do You Wanna Be My Girlfriend" – 3:55
3. "Titanic 650604" – 3:23
4. "Love Suite" – 3:17
5. "Body Heat" – 3:04
6. "My Bed Is Too Big" – 3:13
7. "Too Young" – 3:39
8. "Sorry Little Sarah" (New York dance mix) – 5:56
9. "Silent Water" – 3:34
10. "I Want to Be Your Brother" – 3:12

== Personnel ==
- Dieter Bohlen – lead vocals, chorus, producer, arranger, lyrics
- Rolf Köhler – refrain vocals, chorus
- Detlef Wiedeke – chorus
- Michael Scholz – chorus
- Luis Rodríguez – co-producer

== Charts ==
Chart (1988)	Peak position
Austrian Albums (Ö3 Austria)	23
German Albums (Offizielle Top 100)	20
