= Forever Blue (Blue System album) =

Studio album by Blue System
- Released: 9 October 1995
- Recorded: 1995
- Genre: Europop
- Length: 37:16
- Label: BMG
- Producer: Dieter Bohlen

Blue System chronology
| X - Ten (1994) | Forever Blue (1995) | Body to Body (1996) |

Forever Blue is the eleventh album of Blue System, released in 1995 by BMG Ariola and produced by Dieter Bohlen. The album contains eleven tracks.

== Track listing ==
All tracks are written by Dieter Bohlen

| # | Title | Length |
|---|---|---|
| 1. | "Laila" | 3:27 |
| 2. | "I Wanna Smile" | 3:54 |
| 3. | "Baby Jealousy" | 3:44 |
| 4. | "Taxi Girl" | 3:57 |
| 5. | "All What I Need" | 3:44 |
| 6. | "Marvin's Song" | 3:41 |
| 7. | "Love Is Not A Tragedy" | 3:32 |
| 8. | "Here I Go Again" | 3:25 |
| 9. | "Une Chambre Pour La Nuit" | 3:23 |
| 10. | "It's Ecstasy" | 3:35 |
| 11. | "It's More" | 4:15 |

== Credits ==
- Dieter Bohlen – lead vocals, producer, arranger, lyrics
- Rolf Köhler – refrain vocals, chorus
- Detlef Wiedeke – chorus
- Michael Scholz – chorus
- Luis Rodriguez – co-producer, engineering

Recording: Jeopark by Jeo and T. Brötzmann

- Keyboards: T. Brötzmann and Werner Becker
- Publishing: BMG Records
- Design: Ariola Werkstadt
- Photography: Kramer and Giogoli

== Charts ==
| Chart (1995) | Peak position |
|---|---|
| German Albums | 18 |
| Hungarian Albums | 32 |

== Certifications ==
| Region | Certification | Certified units/sales |
|---|---|---|
| Poland (ZPAV) | Gold | 50,000^{*} |
^{*} Sales figures based on certification alone.
