= Twilight (Blue System album) =

Studio album by Blue System
- Released: 9 October 1989
- Recorded: 1989
- Genre: Europop; synth-pop
- Length: 37:16
- Label: BMG
- Producer: Dieter Bohlen; Luis Rodríguez

Blue System chronology
Body Heat (1988)	Twilight (1989)	Obsession (1990)

Twilight is the third album released by Blue System. It was released on 9 October 1989 by BMG Ariola and was produced by Dieter Bohlen.

== Track listing ==
All songs written and arranged by Dieter Bohlen.

1. "Magic Symphony" – 3:34
2. "Love Me on the Rocks" – 3:27
3. "Save Me" – 3:45
4. "Nobody Makes Me Crazy (Like You Do)" – 3:27
5. "Madonna Blue" – 3:40
6. "Call Me Dr. Love (A New Dimension)" – 3:20
7. "Little Jeannie" – 3:28
8. "Carry Me Oh Carrie" – 3:15
9. "Big Yellow Taxi" – 3:20
10. "Everything I Own" – 3:10

== Personnel ==
- Dieter Bohlen – lead vocals, producer, arranger, lyrics
- Rolf Köhler – refrain vocals, chorus falsetto
- Detlef Wiedeke – chorus falsetto
- Michael Scholz – chorus falsetto
- Luis Rodríguez – co-producer, engineering

== Charts ==
=== Weekly charts ===
Chart (1989)	Peak position
Austrian Albums (Ö3 Austria)	30
German Albums (Offizielle Top 100)	11
Swiss Albums (Schweizer Hitparade)	26

=== Year-end charts ===
Chart (1990)	Position
German Albums (Offizielle Top 100)	98

== Certifications ==
Region	Certification	Certified units/sales
Germany (BVMI)	Gold	250,000^{^}
^{^} Shipments figures based on certification alone.
