= 21st Century (Blue System album) =

Studio album by Blue System
- Released: 21 March 1994
- Genre: Europop
- Length: 37:16
- Label: BMG
- Producer: Dieter Bohlen; Luis Rodríguez

Blue System chronology
Backstreet Dreams (1993)	21st Century (1994)	X - Ten (1994)

21st Century is the ninth album by Blue System. It was published in 1994 by BMG Ariola and produced by Dieter Bohlen. The album contains 12 new tracks.

== Track listing ==
All tracks are written by Dieter Bohlen.

No.	Title	Length
1.	"Welcome to the 21st Century"	1:02
2.	"6 Years – 6 Nights"	3:45
3.	"Venice in the Rain"	4:32
4.	"If I Will Rule the World"	3:41
5.	"Sacrifice"	4:41
6.	"When Bogart Talks to You"	3:44
7.	"That's Love"	3:32
8.	"Lady Unforgettable"	4:16
9.	"This Old Town"	3:26
10.	"21st Century"	3:09
11.	"Sister Cool"	3:21
12.	"See You in the 22nd Century"	1:05

== Personnel ==
- Dieter Bohlen – lead vocals, producer, arranger, lyrics
- Rolf Köhler – refrain vocals, chorus, bass, drums
- Detlef Wiedeke – chorus, guitar
- Michael Scholz – chorus, keyboards
- Luis Rodriguez – co-producer, engineering

== Charts ==
=== Weekly charts ===
Chart (1994)	Peak position
German Albums (Offizielle Top 100)	11

=== Year-end charts ===
Chart (1994)	Position
German Albums (Offizielle Top 100)	98
