= Give a Little Sweet Love =

Single by Mark Ashley featuring Systems in Blue

from the album Heartbreak Boulevard and Heaven & Hell: The Mixes
- B-side: "I've Never Been So Lonely"
- Released: June 19, 2006
- Recorded: 2006
- Length: 3:36
- Label: Spectre Media/Universal Records
- Songwriter(s): Rolf Köhler; Detlef Wiedeke; Marcus Duppach; Steven McKeers; Thomas Widrat; Thomas O'Neal
- Producer(s): Rolf Köhler; Detlef Wiedeke

Mark Ashley singles chronology
"If You Love Me" (2005)	"Give a Little Sweet Love" (2006)	"Give Me a Chance" (2007)

"Give a Little Sweet Love" is a song originally performed by German singer Mark Ashley featuring Systems in Blue, released as a single on June 19, 2006, in Germany. The song has appeared in Mark Ashley's album Heartbreak Boulevard, and Heaven & Hell: The Mixes by Systems in Blue. The song was claimed to be "the new meet-up of Modern Talking" by the media.

== Track listing ==
CD single

1. "Give a Little Sweet Love" (Single Edit) - 3:36
2. "I've Never Been So Lonely" (SIB Version) - 3:17
3. "I've Never Been So Lonely" (Romantic Version) - 3:36
4. "Give a Little Sweet Love" (Instrumental Version) - 3:36
5. "I've Never Been So Lonely" (Instrumental Version) - 3:17

== Personnel ==
- Music: Tracks 1, 4 by Rolf Köhler and Detlef Wiedeke, 2, 3, 5 by Marcus Duppach, Rolf Köhler and Detlef Wiedeke
- Lyrics: Track 1 by Steven McKeers and Thomas Widrat, 2, 3 by Marcus Duppach, Steven McKeers and Thomas O'Neal
- Published by BlueSky Music
- Produced and arranged by Rolf Köhler and Detlef Wiedeke in Music Sternchen Records
- Recorded in Vintage Music & Hammermusic Studios
- Mixed and mastered by Rolf Köhler and Detlef Wiedeke in Vintage Music
- Vocals by Mark Ashley and Systems in Blue
- Photograph: Melanie Aumüller
