= Backstreet Dreams (album) =

Studio album by Blue System
- Released: 19 April 1993
- Recorded: 1992
- Genre: Europop
- Length: 37:16
- Label: BMG
- Producer: Dieter Bohlen; Luis Rodríguez

Blue System chronology
| Hello America (1992) | Backstreet Dreams (1993) | 21st Century (1994) |

Backstreet Dreams is the eighth album by Blue System. It was released in 1993 by BMG Ariola and produced by Dieter Bohlen. The album contains 11 new tracks.

== Track listing ==
All tracks by Dieter Bohlen

| # | Title | Length |
|---|---|---|
| 1. | "History" | 3:37 |
| 2. | "Operator" | 3:15 |
| 3. | "Backstreet Heaven" | 3:48 |
| 4. | "You Are An Angel" | 3:09 |
| 5. | "I'm So Excited" | 3:45 |
| 6. | "Dirty Money" | 3:00 |
| 7. | "Ballerina Girl" | 3:50 |
| 8. | "Lovers In A Missing World" | 3:18 |
| 9. | "Talk To Me" | 3:20 |
| 10. | "Michael Has Gone For A Soldier" | 4:20 |
| 11. | "Don't You Want My Foolish Heart" | 4:01 |

== Personnel ==
- Dieter Bohlen – lead vocals, chorus, producer, arranger, lyrics
- Rolf Köhler – refrain vocals, chorus, bass, drums
- Detlef Wiedeke – chorus, guitar
- Michael Scholz – chorus, keyboards
- Luis Rodriguez – co-producer

== Charts ==
=== Weekly charts ===
| Chart (1993) | Peak position |
|---|---|
| Austrian Albums (Ö3 Austria) | 22 |
| German Albums (Offizielle Top 100) | 5 |
| Hungarian Albums (MAHASZ) | 30 |

=== Year-end charts ===
| Chart (1993) | Position |
|---|---|
| German Albums (Offizielle Top 100) | 87 |
