= 48 Hours =

48 Hours is the length of two days. 48 Hours may also refer to:

== Film and television ==
- 48 Hrs., a 1982 American action comedy film, starring Nick Nolte and Eddie Murphy
- 48 Hours (TV program), an American news/documentary TV program that has aired on CBS since 1988
- Crime Patrol 48 Hours, a season of the Indian TV series Crime Patrol (TV series)
- "48 Hours" (Brooklyn Nine-Nine), a television episode
- "48 Hours" (Stargate SG-1), a television episode
- 48 Hour Film Project, a short-film competition
- 48Hours, a filmmaking competition in New Zealand
- The First 48, an American documentary TV program

== Music ==
- 48 Hours (album), an unreleased album by Frank-N-Dank
- 48 Hours (song), a song by Blue System
- "48 Hours", a song by The Clash from the 1977 album The Clash
- "48 Hours", a song by the Vengaboys from the 2000 album The Platinum Album
- "48Hrs", a song by Disciples released in 2018

== Other ==
- Surgères 48 Hour Race, an ultrarunning race (1985–2010)
