= Dieter: Der Film =

2006 film

- DVD cover
- Written by: Rolf Dieckmann; Michael Schaack (uncredited); Toby Genkel (uncredited)
- Directed by: Michael Schaack; Toby Genkel
- Starring: Dieter Bohlen
- Music by: Dieter Bohlen
- Country of origin: Germany
- Original language: German

Production
- Producers: Michael Schaack; Thomas Walker
- Editor: Sascha Wolff
- Running time: 86 minutes
- Production companies: Universum Film; RTL
- Budget: €6.5 million

Original release
- Network: RTL
- Release: 4 March 2006

Dieter: Der Film ("Dieter: The Film") is a 2006 satirical animated film based on Nichts als die Wahrheit ("Nothing But the Truth"), the autobiography of German music producer Dieter Bohlen published in 2002. The entirety of the soundtrack, including the theme song "Gasoline", was written, composed, and produced by Bohlen. The film was broadcast for the first time on 4 March 2006 on RTL.

== Plot ==
Dieter was born on an East Frisian farm. Very early on, he develops a weakness for beautiful women and music. His father teaches him to always "put some money aside", as one never knows what one might need it for someday.

As a teenager, Dieter plays in several bands and, thanks to that, is very popular with the girls. When he grows up, he begins working as a producer for a record company. His colleague Andy teaches him the equation for success: "Haste Geld, haste Autos, haste Frauen" (English: "If you have money, you have cars, and you have women"). Dieter produces various artists without much success.

Someday, Dieter meets singer Thomas and founds the band Modern Talking, which soon achieves worldwide success. But Thomas's wife Nora interferes more and more with the band's affairs and Modern Talking split up as a result.

Dieter later gets to know Naddel, whom he falls in love with mostly because of her big but fake breasts, and they move together into a big house. However, Dieter then meets Verona and falls in love again. He breaks up with Naddel and marries Verona, but she seems to only be interested in his money. She divorces him and gets 300 trillion Deutsche Mark.

Just as Dieter falls into desperation, Modern Talking makes their comeback and their success is bigger than the first time. However, as he wants success and most of all the money all to himself, he goes to hell. There, he is made to choose between three options to spend eternity: with Wolfgang Petry, as "Thomas Anders's guitarist", or in his studio. Relieved, he chooses his studio. However, once there, he meets Verona again.

== Cast ==
=== Original voices ===
- Dieter Bohlen as narrator
- Bertram Hiese as Dieter Bohlen
- Antonia von Romatowski as Verona Feldbusch and Nadja Abd el Farrag
- Harry Wijnvoord as the Devil
- Wolfgang Völz as Sr. Putzfisch
- Robert Missler as other male roles

== Background ==
The film, which cost around 6.5 million euros, was already completed in 2004 and was supposed to be released in cinemas during the autumn of that year. Following the first postponement to 2005, the film launch was finally cancelled by the distributor Universum Film. In the media, rumours circulated about a lack of quality of the drawings and the story, but the official reason given was that the timing was no longer appropriate: Dieter: Der Film would "not work anymore" for cinemas because the hype around Bohlen and Deutschland sucht den Superstar, the programme supported by him, had gone flat in the meantime. The film premiered after one more year of waiting, in 2006.

The soundtrack was released to accompany the film premiere and Bohlen announced his next book Meine Hammer-Sprüche (English: My Best Quotes). The final of the third season of Deutschland sucht den Superstar was broadcast two weeks after the film. Dieter: Der Film was released on DVD on 12 April 2006.

== Reception ==
=== Critical reception ===
The film received mostly negative reviews from critics. Christian Buß of spiegel.de called the film "a long delayed, completely humour-free animated biopic" and expressed that he felt it "makes the advertised product appear in a rather dubious light". Kino.de compared it negatively to Derrick: Die Pflicht ruft (Derrick: Duty calls), an animated parody of series Derrick.

=== Viewing figures ===
The official public premiere of the film took place on 4 March 2006 on RTL. Dieter: Der Film, which had been mainly advertised through cross promotion, had to compete with the popular programme Wetten, dass..?, which was running at the same time. However, contrarily to expert assessments, it reached 5.51 million viewers and thus a market share of 15,9%.

== Soundtrack ==
Dieter: Der Film

Soundtrack album by Dieter Bohlen
- Released: 3 March 2006
- Recorded: 1984–2003, 2006
- Genres: Electronica; Eurodisco; Dance-pop
- Language: English
- Label: Hansa
- Producer: Dieter Bohlen

Dieter Bohlen chronology
| Here I Am (1997) | Dieter: Der Film (2006) |

Singles from Dieter: Der Film
- 1. "Shooting Star" Released: 3 March 2006

A soundtrack to the movie was released on 3 March 2006 on Hansa Records. It features 12 new tracks by Dieter Bohlen, including a previously unreleased Modern Talking track "Shooting Star" and track "Gasoline" in Blue System style.

=== Track listing ===
All tracks are written by Dieter Bohlen.

| No. | Title | Artist | Length |
|---|---|---|---|
| 1. | "Gasoline" | Dieter Bohlen | 3:39 |
| 2. | "Take Me to the Clouds" | Dieter Bohlen | 3:17 |
| 3. | "Shooting Star" | Modern Talking | 4:10 |
| 4. | "If I Were You" | Dieter Bohlen | 3:10 |
| 5. | "Bizarre Bizarre" | Dieter Bohlen | 3:46 |
| 6. | "Tears May Go" | Dieter Bohlen | 3:43 |
| 7. | "Don't Let Me Down" | Dieter Bohlen | 3:52 |
| 8. | "Love Is Stronger" | Dieter Bohlen | 3:44 |
| 9. | "Senorita" | Dieter Bohlen | 3:55 |
| 10. | "The Way You Smile" | Dieter Bohlen | 3:29 |
| 11. | "How Will I Know" | Dieter Bohlen | 3:12 |
| 12. | "I Promised You" | Dieter Bohlen | 3:25 |
| 13. | "You're My Heart, You're My Soul" | Modern Talking | 5:33 |
| 14. | "You Can Win If You Want" | Modern Talking | 3:49 |
| 15. | "Cheri, Cheri Lady" | Modern Talking | 3:45 |
| 16. | "Brother Louie" | Modern Talking | 3:40 |
| 17. | "Atlantis is Calling (S.O.S. for Love)" | Modern Talking | 3:48 |
| 18. | "Geronimo's Cadillac" | Modern Talking | 3:17 |
