= My Bed Is Too Big =

Single by Blue System

from the album Body Heat
- Released: 18 April 1988
- Genre: Synth-pop
- Length: 3:30
- Label: BMG Ariola
- Songwriter: Dieter Bohlen
- Producer: Dieter Bohlen

Blue System singles chronology
"Big Boys Don't Cry" (1988)	"My Bed Is Too Big" (1988)	"Under My Skin" (1988)

Music video
- "My Bed Is Too Big" on YouTube

"My Bed Is Too Big" is the first single from Blue System's second album, Body Heat. It was published in 1988 by Hanseatic M.V. and was distributed by BMG. The song was written, arranged and produced by Dieter Bohlen, and co-produced by Luis Rodríguez.

== Track listing ==
- CD maxi (Hansa 659 918)
1. "My Bed Is Too Big" (No Longer Too Big Bed mix) – 5:20
2. "My Bed Is Too Big" (instrumental) – 3:30
3. "My Bed Is Too Big" (radio version) – 3:30
4. "Sorry, Little Sarah" (long version) – 5:12
- 7″ single (Hansa 109 918)
1. "My Bed Is Too Big" – 3:30
2. "My Bed Is Too Big" (instrumental) – 3:30
- 12″ maxi (Hansa 609 918)
1. "My Bed Is Too Big" (No Longer Too Big Bed mix) – 5:20
2. "My Bed Is Too Big" (instrumental) – 3:30
3. "My Bed Is Too Big" (radio version) – 3:30

== Charts ==
Chart (1988)	Peak position
Austria (Ö3 Austria Top 40)	4
West Germany (GfK)	10

=== Year-end charts ===
Chart (1988)	Peak position
West Germany	19
