= Deja =

Deja or Dejah may refer to:

- Deja News, an archive of messages posted to Usenet discussion groups and its successor deja.com
- Adam Deja (born 1993), Polish footballer
- Andreas Deja (born 1957), German animator
- Dejah Mulipola (born 1998), American softball player
- Dejah Thoris, a fictional character in Edgar Rice Burroughs' Martian novels
- Deja, a village in Sălățig Commune, Sălaj County, Romania
- Deja Monét Trimble, known professionally as Dej Loaf, American rapper, singer and songwriter
- Déjà, a 1980s R&B musical group that also recorded under the name Aurra
- Deja, a 2021 album by Colombian band Bomba Estereo
- Dagnum, a former settlement in Albania
- DeJa Skye, American drag queen
- Deja (given name)

== See also ==
- Déjà vu (disambiguation)
