= Only with You =

Only with You may refer to:

- "Only with You" (Blue System song), 1996
- "Only with You" (Captain Hollywood Project song), 1993
- "Only with You", a song by The Beach Boys from Holland
- "Only With You", a 1984 song written by Alan O'Day and performed by Tatsuro Yamashita on Big Wave
