= Backstreet Dreams =

Backstreet Dreams may refer to:

- Backstreet Dreams (album), a 1993 album by Blue System
- Backstreet Dreams (film), a 1990 drama film starring Brooke Shields
