= Praying to the Aliens =

Praying to the Aliens may refer to:

- "Praying to the Aliens", a Blue System song from the 1991 album Déjà Vu
- "Praying to the Aliens", a Gary Numan song from the 1979 Tubeway Army album Replicas
- Praying to the Aliens, Gary Numan's 1997 autobiography, coauthored by Steve Malins
