= Laila (song) =

Single by Blue System

from the album Forever Blue
- Released: September 1995
- Label: Hansa
- Songwriter(s): Dieter Bohlen
- Producer(s): Dieter Bohlen

Blue System singles chronology
"Dr. Mabuse" (1994)	"Laila" (1995)	"Only with You" (1996)

Music video
- "Laila" (Director's Cut) on YouTube

"Laila" is a song by Blue System. It is the first track on their 1995 eleventh studio album, Forever Blue, and was released as its lead single around a month prior.

The single debuted at number 88 in Germany for the week of September 25, 1995 and re-entered at number 49 two weeks later, eventually, three more weeks later, peaking at number 29.

== Composition ==
The song is written and produced by Dieter Bohlen.

== Charts ==
Chart (1995)	Peak position
Germany (GfK)	29
