= Deja vous =

Deja vous may refer to:

- A common misspelling and pun on the French phrase déjà vu

== Music ==
- "Deja Vous", a song by Headkase from the albums The Beginning (2001) and The Worm County Circus (2011)
- "Deja Vous", a song by Lucky Boys Confusion from the 1998 album Growing Out of It
- "Deja Vous", a song by Siegel–Schwall Band from the 2005 album Flash Forward
- "Déjà Vous", a song by Rosita Vai from the 2005 album Golden

== See also ==
- Deja vu (disambiguation)
- DejaView, a Canadian television channel
