= Romeo and Juliet (Blue System song) =

Single by Blue System

from the album Hello America
- Released: 1992
- Label: Hansa
- Songwriter(s): Dieter Bohlen
- Producer(s): Dieter Bohlen

Blue System singles chronology
"It's All Over" (1991)	"Romeo and Juliet" (1992)	"I Will Survive" (1992)

Music video
- "Romeo and Juliet" (ZDF, 1992) on YouTube

"Romeo and Juliet" is a song by Blue System. It is the first track on their 1992 seventh studio album, Hello America, and was released as its lead single.

The single debuted at number 97 in Germany for the week of March 9, 1992, peaking at number 25 two weeks later.

== Composition ==
The song is written and produced by Dieter Bohlen.

== Charts ==
Chart (1992)	Peak position
Austria (Ö3 Austria Top 40)	22
Germany (GfK)	25
