= Mabuse =

Mabuse may refer to:

== People ==
- Jan Gossaert (c. 1478–1532), Flemish painter from Maubeuge who also went by "Jan Mabuse"
- Motsi Mabuse (born 1981), South African-born dancer
- Oti Mabuse (born 1990), South African-born dancer
- Sipho Mabuse (born 1951), South African musician
- Bernard Sainz (born 1943), a.k.a. Dr. Mabuse, French unlicensed sports doctor

== Arts and entertainment ==
- Dr. Mabuse, a fictional literary character created by Norbert Jacques
- "Dr. Mabuse" (Propaganda song), a song by Propaganda
- "Dr. Mabuse" (Blue System song), a song by Blue System
- Mabuse (comics), a DC Comics character who is an enemy of Batman

== Places ==
- Maubeuge, northern French commune whose historical Flemish name is Mabuse

== See also ==
- The Mabuses, British rock band
