= Déjà vu (Blue System album) =

Studio album by Blue System
- Released: 30 September 1991
- Recorded: 1991
- Genre: Synth-pop
- Length: 36:57
- Label: Hansa
- Producer: Dieter Bohlen; Luis Rodríguez

Blue System chronology
Seeds of Heaven (1991)	Déjà vu (1991)	Hello America (1992)

Singles from Déjà vu
- 1. "Déjà vu" Released: 9 September 1991; 2. "It's All Over" Released: 25 November 1991

Professional ratings
Review scores
Source	Rating
AllMusic	3.5/5 stars

Déjà vu is the sixth album by Blue System. It was published in 1991 by BMG Ariola and produced by Dieter Bohlen. The album contains 10 new tracks.

== Release and promotion ==
=== Singles ===
The title track, "Déjà vu", was released as the album's lead single on 9 September 1991, three weeks ahead of the album. It spent a total of 14 weeks on the German singles chart, with a two-week peak at number 12. "Déjà vu" also charted in Austria at number 16. Marketed as a duet between Dieter Bohlen and Dionne Warwick, "It's All Over" was released as the album's second and final single on 25 November 1991. It spent 7 weeks on the German Singles Chart, peaking in its first week at number 60.

== Track listing ==
All tracks written by Dieter Bohlen. Credits are adapted from the album's liner notes.

No.	Title	Length
1.	"Déjà vu"	3:42
2.	"It's All Over" (feat. Dionne Warwick)	3:57
3.	"New York – Berlin – Paris"	3:59
4.	"Mrs. Jones"	4:09
5.	"Sexy Thing"	3:08
6.	"Praying to the Aliens"	3:48
7.	"Dressed in Blue"	3:30
8.	"Better Than the Rest"	3:59
9.	"Is It Love?"	3:02
10.	"Just Say No"	3:44
Total length:		36:57

== Personnel ==
- Dieter Bohlen – lead vocals, producer, arranger, lyrics
- Rolf Köhler – refrain vocals, chorus falsetto
- Detlef Wiedeke – chorus falsetto
- Michael Scholz – chorus falsetto
- Luis Rodriguez – co-producer, engineering
- Recording – in Jeopark by Jeo and Vox Klang Studio
- Design – Ariola/Artpool
- Photograph – Esser & Strauss, and F. Gabowicz

== Charts ==
=== Weekly charts ===
Chart (1991)	Peak position
Austrian Albums (Ö3 Austria)	27
German Albums (Offizielle Top 100)	18

== Certifications ==
Region	Certification	Certified units/sales
Germany (BVMI)	Gold	250,000^{^}
^{^} Shipments figures based on certification alone.
