= Body to Body =

Body to Body may refer to:

- Body to Body (Blue System album), 1995
- Body to Body (Technotronic album), 1991
- Body to Body, Job to Job, a 1991 compilation album by Swans
- "Body to Body" (song), by BTS, 2026
- "Body II Body", a 2000 song by Samantha Mumba
- "Body 2 Body", a 2011 song by Ace Hood featuring Chris Brown
- Corps à corps or Body to Body, 2003 French language film starring Emmanuelle Seigner and Philippe Torreton
