= Hello America (disambiguation) =

Hello America may refer to:

- Hello America, a 1981 novel by J. G. Ballard
- "Hello America" (song), a song by Def Leppard from their album On Through the Night
- Hello America (album), a 1992 album by Blue System
- Hello America (film), a 1998 Egyptian film starring Adel Emam
- Hello America, the fictional morning television show from the Nicolas Cage film The Weather Man
