= AB'S =

Japanese rock band formed in 1982

- Origin: Tokyo, Japan
- Genres: Rock, AOR, soft rock, City Pop
- Years active: 1982–1985, 1988, 2003-present
- Labels: Moon, Warner Music Japan, Dreamweaver
- Members: Fujimaru Yoshino; Makoto Matsushita; Atsuo Okamoto; Kazuyuki Takekoshi; Yosuke Toyama
- Past members: Yoshihiko Ando; Hidetoshi Yamada; Naoki Watanabe; Yoshinobu Kojima; Hideki Matubara; Tohru Hasebe

AB'S (often written "A.B.'s" in the UK) is a male Japanese rock band formed in Tokyo in 1982. Their song "Deja Vu" was released in the U.K. and often categorized as instrumental and or jazz funk, but the music of AB'S, including "Deja Vu" is also known for their chorus performance in Japan.

The band currently consists of Fujimaru Yoshino (芳野藤丸) (guitars, vocals), Makoto Matsushita (松下誠) (guitars, vocals), Atsuo Okamoto (岡本郭男) (drums, vocals), Kazuyuki Takekoshi (越かずゆき) (keys, vocals) and Yosuke Toyama (遠山陽介) (bass, vocals). As all the members are session players, sometimes the band is compared to Toto in Japan.

AB'S is sometimes known for a musical style that combines elements of pop, rock, funk and progressive rock.

== Biography ==
=== Formation (1982) ===
The members are Fujimaru Yoshino and the recording members of his first solo album Yoshino Fujimal released in 1982. Yoshino recruited Matsushita when he listened to Matsushita's first album First Light (1981) and he wanted to form a band with Matsushita. Yoshino also recruited Watanabe and Okamoto, both of whom were formerly a Bassist and Drummer (respectively) for the Brass-Rock band, SPECTRUM from 1979 to 1981, and Ando also for his ability of writing lyrics.

The band name came from the blood types of the original members. The blood type of Yoshino, Matsushita and Watanabe is AB, and the blood type of Ando and Okamoto is A. Therefore, the name "A.B.'s", written on the 12-inch single Deja Vu released in the U.K. is incorrect.

The leaflet for their second album promotion published by Alfa Moon Records, shows the blood types of each member with profiles. They also thought that the name starting with AB would become first in a catalogue. In 2012, Yoshino said in his Facebook that he saw the result of his latest medical check and learned that his blood-type is not AB but B, after Matsushita's reissued CD (see above) was released.

=== 1982–96 ===
The band released their first single Girl/ Django in December, 1982, and their first album AB'S in January, 1983. Then they recorded their second album in London, and released the 12inch single Deja Vu/ Asian Moon in the U.K., which were contained in the first album. They released the second album AB'S-2 in 1984. Yoshino and Matsushita also released solo albums respectively.

To start his new progressive rock band Paradigm Shift, Matsushita left the band after the tour in 1984. The third album was recorded again in London and all guitars were performed by Yoshino and overdubbed. The album AB'S-3 and the 12-inch single C.I.A. were released in 1985, but soon they stopped their band career in 1985.

After three-year interval, Yoshino recorded several songs and released as AB'S-4 in 1988, but the other musicians were different from the original lineup. The band stopped their career again.

The CDs "Classic Jazz-Funk Series" were released in UK, and the original version of the song "Deja Vu" was included. The band name was corrected in the liner-note and written as "AB's".

=== Matsushita's return and A5B3S, New and Blue (2004–2007) ===
Yoshino said AB'S restarted again with the original lineup, and did a gig and released a limited mini album A5B3S(A-go-B-san-zu), and toured in 2004. During the rehearsal, Yoshino suffered cerebral infarction, but he continued the gig. The mini album was sold only at the official website and the gigs from an independence label.

The band decided to continue the band and to perform on the stage of Crossover Japan '05. Ando did not hope to perform except in special events, he decided to leave the band. Watanabe recruited Hidetoshi Yamada (山田秀俊) (keyboards, vocals), and the two keyboard players performed together on the event. Their maxi single "SINGLE" released at the event day, in which only Yamada played keyboards.

The song "Dead or Alive" is the rearranged version of "Turquoise Blue", the theme of Golgo 13 Queen Bee, all music of which was composed by Fujimaru Yoshino. After the event, they released their 5th original full album New and toured in fall, 2005, did a gig in 2006. The album title came from just the fact that the album was new. Soon they started to record their 6th album and released in 2007. The album title Blue came from the color of the album jacket. Around the end of this year, Yamada decided to play only acoustic piano and chose to leave the band. After Yamada's leaving, the band temporarily stopped their activity.

=== 2013 ===
In 2013, four albums from the Alpha Moon era ("AB'S", "AB'S-2", "AB'S-3", "AB'S-4") were converted to SHD-CDs under the supervision of and with commentary by Toshikazu Kanazawa. A limited edition was also released with liner notes containing Kanazawa's interview with Yoshino and Matsushita.

=== 2019- ===
On February 3, 2019, AB's performed in a new formation that consisted of the original members Fujimaru Yoshino, Makoto Matsushita and Atsuo Okamoto and new members Ikuya Meguro (bass, vocals) and Kazuyuki Takekoshi (keys, vocals). Meguro left the group and was replaced by Yosuke Toyama sometime after.

AB's will record a new album in March 2020, set for release sometime after the summer of 2020.

== Band members ==
=== Current members ===
- Fujimaru Yoshino: A guitarist, singer, songwriter, arranger, producer. (1982-)
  - The bandmaster of Hideki Saijo's backup band.
  - The member of a Japanese rock band SHOGUN, who wrote and played music for Tantei Monogatari television series (main cast: Yūsaku Matsuda).
  - Composed and played music for Golgo 13 (Queen Bee).
  - Played guitars for numerous artists such as Joe Yamanaka, Momoe Yamaguchi, Seiko Matsuda, Sayuri Ishikawa, commercial films, animation films such as Neon Genesis Evangelion.
  - Released three solo albums, and in the second album ("Romantic Guys"), he played with L.A. musicians, Nathen East, Abraham Laboriel and Robben Ford.
- Makoto Matsushita: A guitarist, singer, songwriter, arranger, producer. (1982–84, 2003-)
  - Released three solo albums in 80s, and formed a progressive rock band Paradigm Shift(1985-).
  - Arranged the opening and ending theme of Heavy Metal L-Gaim.
  - Recently famous for chorus arrangement for Johnny & Associates such as SMAP and Kinki Kids, and guitar playing for Hideaki Tokunaga.
  - Played guitars for many artists, animations such as Neon Genesis Evangelion.
- Atsuo Okamoto: A drummer, singer, songwriter. (1982–85, 2003-)
  - The member of AIDO(1975–6), Spectrum(1979–81), The Triple X(1997-).
  - The member of the backing band of Tsuyoshi Nagabuchi (2002, 2004–9,2012).
  - Played for many artists such as Chiharu Matsuyama, Nobuteru Maeda, Mari Hamada, Takahiro Matsumoto, Kyoji Yamamoto, TV series, animations, and video games such as Final Fantasy IX ("Melodies of Life").
- Kazuyuki Takekoshi: keyboardist, singer. (2019-)
- Yosuke Toyama: bassist, singer. (2019-)

=== Former members ===
- Naoki Watanabe: A bassist, singer, songwriter, arranger. (1982–85, 2003–2007)
  - The member of MMP, the backup band of Candies (group) in '70s.
  - Formed a horn-featured funk band Spectrum (1979–81) and released six albums.
  - Started Solo-Bass Club in 2002, and released instructional notes and a DVD from Rittor Music.
  - Played for many artists such as Michiya Haruhata, Nobuteru Maeda, Maki Ohguro, Kyoji Yamamoto, TV dramas, animations, and video games such as Final Fantasy X ("Suteki-dane).
- Yoshihiko Ando: A keyboardist, singer, songwriter, lyricist. (1982–85, 2003–05)
- Hidetoshi Yamada: A keyboardist, singer, songwriter, arranger. (2005–2007)
- Yoshinobu Kojima: A keyboardist, songwriter, arranger, producer. (1988)
- Hideki Matubara: A bassist, songwriter. (1988)
- Tohru Hasebe: A drummer, songwriter. Better recognized as the drummer of Japanese Jazz-Fusion Group T-SQUARE from 1982 to 1986. (1988)

== Discography ==
=== Ab's (1983) (cd: 2001; shm-cd: 2013) ===
1. Deja Vu (lyrics: Yoshihiko Ando/ music: Naoki Watanabe)
2. Dee-Dee-Phone (lyrics: Yoshihiko Ando/ music: Makoto Matsushita)
3. Django (lyrics: Yoshihiko Ando/ music: Makoto Matsushita)
4. Fill the Sail (lyrics: Yoshihiko Ando/ music: Fujimaru Yoshino)
5. Asian Moon (lyrics: Jeff Keeling/ music: Naoki Watanabe)
6. In the City Night (lyrics: Yoshihiko Ando/ music: Atsuo Okamoto)
7. Girl (lyrics: Yoshihiko Ando/ music: Fujimaru Yoshino)
8. Just You (lyrics: Jeff Keeling/ music: Makoto Matsushita)
9. Girl (Single Version) SHM-CD Only
10. Django (Single Version) SHM-CD Only

=== Ab's-2 (1984) (cd: 2001; shm-cd: 2013) ===
1. Destination (lyrics: Yoshihiko Ando/ music: Fujimaru Yoshino)
2. Japanese Punkish Girl (lyrics: Yoshihiko Ando/ music: Makoto Matsushita)
3. Morning Dew (lyrics: Yoshihiko Ando/ music: Naoki Watanabe)
4. Just A Rainy Blues (lyrics: Yoshihiko Ando/ music: Fujimaru Yoshino)
5. Flight 007 (lyrics: Yoshihiko Ando/ music: Atsuo Okamoto)
6. One Night in Moscow (lyrics: Yoshihiko Ando/ music: Naoki Watanabe)
7. Correspondence (lyrics: Yoshihiko Ando/ music: Makoto Matsushita)
8. Do You Remember Me? (lyrics: Yoshihiko Ando/ music: Fujimaru Yoshino)

=== Ab's-3 (1985) (cd: 2001, shm-cd: 2013) ===
1. By the End of the Century (lyrics: Yoshihiko Ando/ music: Fujimaru Yoshino)
2. Heavy Mental Rock (lyrics: Yoshihiko Ando/ music: Fujimaru Yoshino)
3. Far East Express (lyrics: Yoshihiko Ando/ music: Naoki Watanabe)
4. Ethnic Cosmic (lyrics: Yoshihiko Ando/ music: Atsuo Okamoto)
5. Cry Baby Blues (lyrics: Yoshihiko Ando/ music: Fujimaru Yoshino)
6. C.I.A. (lyrics: Gregory Starr/ music: Fujimaru Yoshino)
7. Borderline (lyrics: Gregory Starr/ music: Naoki Watanabe)
8. Sequence Life (lyrics: Jeff Keeling/ music: Naoki Watanabe)
9. Cry Baby Blues (Single Version) [bonus track] SHM-CD Only
10. C.I.A.(extended dub mix) [bonus track] CD and SHM-CD Only
11. C.I.A.(extended club mix) [bonus track] CD and SHM-CD Only

=== AB'S-4 (1988) (SHM-CD: 2013) ===
1. Let Me Go~ (lyrics: Allan Denis Rich & Dorothy Sea Gazeley/ music: Fujimaru Yoshino)
2. We Just Missed Each Other (lyrics: Michael Himelstein/ music: Hideki Matsubara)
3. All You Ever Know (lyrics: Michael Himelstein/ music: Yoshinobu Kojima)
4. Can't Get Enough of You (lyrics:Kevin Gorman/ music: Tohru Hasebe)
5. Across the Park (lyrics: Craig Fleishman/ music: Hideki Matsubara)
6. You Just Gotta Forget about Time(lyrics: Brian Yamakoshi/music: Yoshinobu Kojima)
7. Things Being What They Are (lyrics: Michael Himelstein/ music :Fujimaru Yoshino)
8. Give Back My Heart (lyrics: Michael Himelstein/ music: Tohru Hasebe)
9. Take A Chance On Me (lyrics: Allan Denis Rich & Dorothy Sea Gazeley/ music:Fujimaru Yoshino)
10. I'm Falling (lyrics: Susanne M. Edgren & Barbara Hain/ music: Yoshinobu Kojima)
11. ~Let Me Go(Instrumental)(music: Fujimaru Yoshino)

=== AB'S Best Collection --Moon Years-- (2002) ===
1. Girl
2. Cry Baby Blues
3. Fill the Sail
4. Deja Vu
5. Do You Remember Me?
6. By the End of Century
7. Destination
8. Correspondence
9. In the City Night
10. C.I.A.
11. Take a Chance on Me
12. Things Being What They Are

=== A5B3S (2004)(limited mini album) ===
1. Last Horizon (lyrics: Yoshihiko Ando/ music:Atsuo Okamoto)
2. The Shadow of the Night (lyrics: Yoshihiko Ando/ music: Fujimaru Yoshino)
3. End of May (lyrics & music: Makoto Matsushita)
4. Catalog Life (lyrics & music:Yoshihiko Ando)
5. Long Goodbye (lyrics:Yoshihiko Ando/ music:Naoki Watanabe)

=== Single (2005) (maxi single) ===
1. I My Me (lyrics: Yoshihiko Ando/ music: Naoki Watanabe)
2. Dead or Alive (lyrics: Yoshihiko Ando/ music: Fujimaru Yoshino)
3. Light the Night (lyrics & music: Makoto Matsushita)

=== New (2005) ===
1. Music Crusade (lyrics: Makoto Matsushita /music: Atsuo Okamoto)
2. The Planet in our Hands (lyrics: Yoshihiko Ando/ music: Hidetoshi Yamada)
3. Day After Tomorrow (lyrics: Yoshihiko Ando/ music: Naoki Watanabe)
4. She's Like Falling Rain (lyrics: Yoshihiko Ando/music: Fujimaru Yoshino)
5. Tonight (lyrics: Makoto Matsushita/music:Hidetoshi Yamada)
6. Round About Midnight (lyrics:Yoshihiko Ando/music:Fujimaru Yoshino)
7. Walking in the Rain (lyrics & music: Makoto Matsushita)
8. Can You Keep It Up!? (lyrics:Yoshihiko Ando/music:Atsuo Okamoto)
9. Always (lyrics & music: Makoto Matsushita)
10. Dream on Dreamer(lyrics:Yoshihiko Ando/music:Naoki Watanabe)

=== Blue (2007) ===
1. Ooh Baby (lyrics: Kane Tominaga/music:Fujimaru Yoshino)
2. Night View (lyrics: Makoto Matsushita/music:Atsuo Okamoto)
3. Until the End of Time (lyrics:Kane Tominaga/music:Hidetoshi Yamada)
4. Kimi-ga iru kiseki (君がいる奇跡) (lyrics: Kosuke Kamishin /music: Naoki Watanabe)
5. Only One (lyrics:Kane Tominaga/music:Fujimaru Yoshino)
6. Summer Wave (lyrics & music: Makoto Matsushita)
7. Un-til the Break of Dawn (lyrics:Kane Tominaga/music:Hidetoshi Yamada)
8. Rhythm of Universe (lyrics・music:Naoki Watanabe)
9. Back to Paradise (lyrics:Yoshihiko Ando/music:Atsuo Okamoto)
10. Into the Light (lyrics & music: Makoto Matsushita)

=== DVD: Crossover Japan '05 (Live: Omnibus) Disc 1 (2005) ===
1. 05 Correspondence (lyrics: Yoshihiko Ando/music: Makoto Matsushita)
2. 06 Dead or Alive (lyrics: Yoshihiko Ando/music:Fujimaru Yoshino)
3. 07 Light the Night (lyrics・music: Makoto Matsushita)

=== DVD: AB'S M.V.C.--Music Video Clips-- (2007) (limited) ===
1. I My Me (lyrics: Yoshihiko Ando/ music:Naoki Watanabe)
2. Dead or Alive (lyrics: Yoshihiko Ando/ music:Fujimaru Yoshino)
3. Light the Night (lyrics & music: Makoto Matsushita)
4. Music Crusade (lyrics: Makoto Matsushita/ music: Atsuo Okamoto)
5. Summer Wave (lyrics & music: Makoto Matsushita)
6. Night View (lyrics: Makoto Matsushita/ music: Atsuo Okamoto)
