= Silent Water =

Single by Blue System

from the album Body Heat
- Released: January 1989
- Label: Hansa
- Songwriter(s): Dieter Bohlen
- Producer(s): Dieter Bohlen

Blue System singles chronology
"Under My Skin" (1988)	"Silent Water" (1989)	"Love Suite" (remix '89) (1989)

Music video
- "Silent Water" on YouTube

"Silent Water" is a song by Blue System. It is the ninth and penultimate track on their 1988 second studio album, Body Heat. The song was released as a single in the beginning of January 1989.

The single debuted at number 13 in West Germany for the week of 16 January 1989. The song was the title song from the German television movie Tatort: Moltke.

== Composition ==
The song is written and produced by Dieter Bohlen.

== Charts ==
Chart (1989)	Peak position
Austria (Ö3 Austria Top 40)	16
West Germany (GfK)	13
