= Shooting Star (Modern Talking song) =

Song by Modern Talking

from the album Dieter: Der Film
- Released: March 3, 2006
- Recorded: 1998–2001 (Thomas Anders' vocals); 2006 (falsetto choruses)
- Genre: Synth-pop
- Length: 4:08
- Label: Hansa
- Songwriter: Dieter Bohlen
- Producer: Dieter Bohlen

Audio
- "Shooting Star" by Modern Talking on YouTube

"Shooting Star" is a song by Modern Talking that was first released on the Dieter: Der Film soundtrack (2006), almost three years after the band's second split. The song was produced by Dieter Bohlen and consists of fragments of older Modern Talking songs set to a new melody. It features the falsetto choruses characteristic of the band and samples Louis Armstrong's voice in the beginning.

== Background ==
In 2003, three years before "Shooting Star" was released, Modern Talking dissolved for the second time in controversial fashion. Bohlen had announced the end of the band during a June concert in Rostock, to the shock of lead singer Thomas Anders and of the audience. The relationship between Bohlen and Anders further deteriorated following the publication of Bohlen's second autobiography Hinter den Kulissen (English: "Behind the Scenes") in October 2003, in which he accused Anders of stealing money from him. In 2005, Anders won the process for libel and succeeded in having certain passages removed, but lost the process for compensation.

In 2006, Bohlen produced Dieter: Der Film, which is based on his first autobiography Nichts als die Wahrheit (English: "Nothing But the Truth"), released in 2002. The film's soundtrack contains a previously unreleased Modern Talking song, "Shooting Star", which consists of fragments of older songs of the band such as "Don't Take Away My Heart", "Cosmic Girl", "Fly to the Moon", "Time Is on My Side", "Send Me a Letter from Heaven", "I'm Not Guilty", or "After Your Love Is Gone". The song contained only the typical falsetto choruses, because Anders was not available for this production.

In 2017, Bohlen released a Modern Talking album titled Back for Gold. It contains new versions of the band's first six singles produced by him, as well as a remastered version of "Shooting Star".
