= History (Blue System song) =

Single by Blue System

from the album Backstreet Dreams
- Released: 1993
- Label: Hansa
- Songwriter(s): Dieter Bohlen
- Producer(s): Dieter Bohlen

Blue System singles chronology
"I Will Survive" (1992)	"History" (1993)	"Operator" (1993)

Music video
- "History" on YouTube

"History" is a song by German pop group Blue System. It is the first track on their eighth studio album, Backstreet Dreams (1993), and was released as its lead single around a month prior by Hansa Records. The song was both written and produced by Dieter Bohlen and debuted at number 48 in Germany for the week of April 5, 1993, peaking at number 26 two and four weeks later.

== Charts ==
Chart (1993)	Peak position
Europe (Eurochart Hot 100)	99
Germany (GfK)	26
