= Systems in Blue =

German pop band

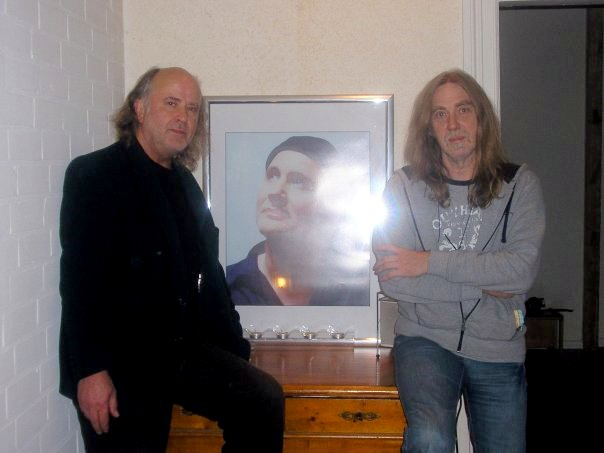
- Scholz (left) and Wiedeke (right) with Köhler on the portrait in the background

Background information
- Origin: Germany
- Genres: Euro disco, Eurodance, synthpop, Hi-NRG
- Years active: 2003–present
- Label: Spectre / Universal
- Members: Detlef Wiedeke; Michael Scholz
- Past members: Rolf Köhler (died 2007); Olaf Senkbeil
- Website: systems-in-blue.de

Systems in Blue is a German pop band originally composed of Rolf Köhler, Michael Scholz, and Detlef Wiedeke. After Köhler's death, singer Olaf Senkbeil was invited to join them. The project is known for continuing the typical Modern Talking sound and having Rolf Köhler, Michael Scholz, and Detlef Wiedeke at the front of the band after they were in the dark for years during Modern Talking and Blue System.

The original band members started in the beginning of the 1960s, working in different bands during 1960s and 1970s, Köhler worked for several different artists such as Blonker, Uriah Heep, Blind Guardian, Helloween, Grave Digger, Gamma Ray, Iron Savior, Savage Circus, Tokyo, Mephistopheles, and Kin Ping Meh (featuring Geff Harrison) among others. They were part of the choruses of the Dieter Bohlen produced Modern Talking in 1984–1987 and 1998–2000 and Blue System in 1987–1997 with Köhler as the refrain singer.

== History ==
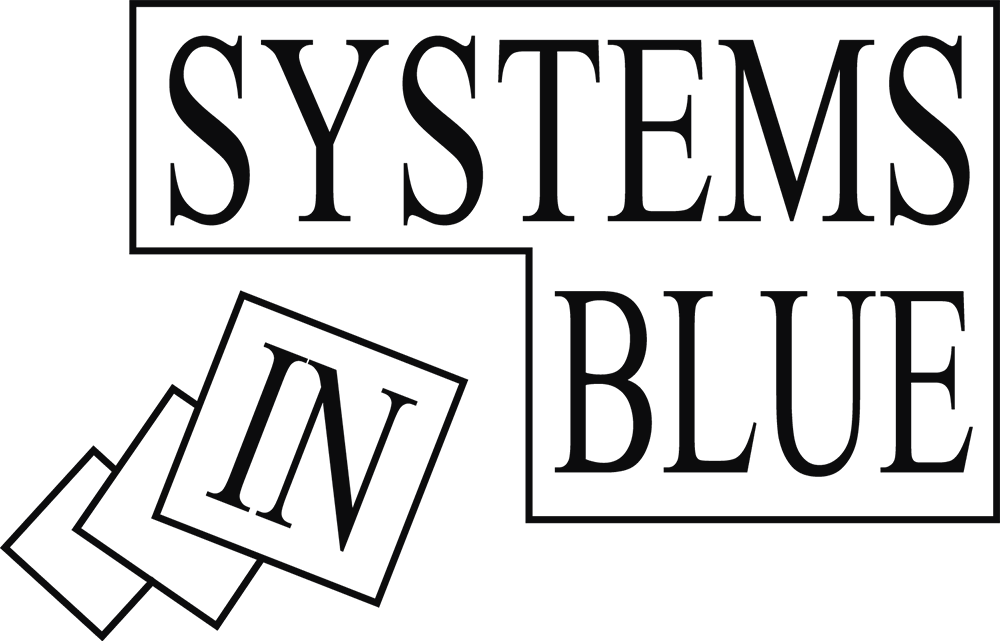
The group's logo

In 2003, together with songwriter/producer Thomas Widrat, they founded a project Systems in Blue. Their first single Magic Mystery was released in March 2004. After changing the label and two more singles, they released their first album Point of No Return on 20 September 2005.

In September 2007, lead vocalist Rolf Köhler suffered a stroke and died shortly after. He was 56 years old.

After a pause, Systems in Blue started again with Michael Scholz, Detlef Wiedeke and a new member Olaf Senkbeil who was a close friend and yet working with them on several projects. After several concerts together, Senkbeil took a real place in the band. In 2015, they begin to work with French producer Johann Perrier (producer of Bad Boys Blue, Fr David, Ryan Paris, Linda Jo Rizzo...) and his label Modern Romantics Productions Sarl.

In 2015, they released the EP "Back in Blue" with new songs from Systems in Blue and remixes from MS Project (aka Johann Perrier) and Itamar Moraz. The song "Children of the Night" coming from this EP became the most successful song of Systems in Blue ever.

In 2017 was the time for the third album of the band "Melange Bleu" that included new songs written by Systems in Blue and songs by Johann Perrier, with the singles "Take It Like a Man", "She's a Gambler" and the special 80s maxi vinyl of "There's No Heart" produced by Itamar Moraz and Karel Post. The album charted in several countries in digital.

In the meantime, Detlef Wiedeke and Olaf Senkbeil created "Do Passion", their own musical project, when few months ago Michael Scholz and Johann Perrier were working on their deep/tropical project "MS Project & Michael Scholz", all of this in parallel of Systems in Blue.

Systems in Blue released in 2019 the EP "Blue Horizons" with two new songs and several remixes from MS Project & Capitain Trash.

In 2020 came the fourth album "Blue Universe", kind of continuation of "Melange Bleu" where several musical directions were coexisting between Systems in Blue, Do Passion (project of Detlef Wiedeke and Olaf Senkbeil) and Michael Scholz & MS Project (project of Michael Scholz and Johann Perrier), released in December 2020 in physical and January 2021 in digital. This album charted in more than ten countries in digital and had very nice results with the first single "Play for Me the Melody of Love" including remixes from Captain Trash and MS Project.

End of 2020, Olaf Senkbeil left Systems in Blue to concentrate on his own projects.

In June 2021, a deluxe edition of "Blue Universe" will be released including lot of remixes and instrumental versions.

In May 2026 they released "Blue Odyssey".

== Discography ==
=== Albums ===
- 2005: Point of No Return
- 2008: Out of the Blue
- 2009: Heaven & Hell: The Mixes
- 2010: The Big Blue Megamix
- 2011: Symphony in Blue – The Best Of
- 2012: Voices from Beyond
- 2015: Back in Blue (EP)
- 2017: Mélange bleu
- 2019: Blue Horizons (EP)
- 2020: Blue Universe (featuring MS Project and DO Passion)
- 2026: Blue Odyssey

=== Singles ===
- 2004: "Magic Mystery"
- 2004: "Winner"
- 2005: "Point of No Return"
- 2006: "1001 Nights"
- 2006: "Give a Little Sweet Love" (featuring Mark Ashley)
- 2007: "Voodoo Queen"
- 2008: "Dr. No"
- 2009: "Heaven and Hell"
- 2015: "Back in Blue"
- 2017: "Take It Like a Man"
- 2017: "She's a Gambler"
- 2018: "There's No Heart" (special 80s maxi-version produced by Itamar Moraz & Karel Post)
- 2020: "Play for Me the Melody of Love"
- 2021: "Don't Walk into the Light"

=== Limited editions ===
- 2004: Winner (Special Fan – Edition)
- 2005: System in Blue
- 2005: Sexy Ann
- 2008: Jeannie Moviestar (featuring Mark Ashley)
- 2017: Take It Like a Man Deluxe Edition

=== DVDs ===
- 2005: SIB & Patty Ryan live in Essen (as DVD-R)
- 2006: SIB Behind The Scenes 1001 (as DVD-R)
