= Biju Viswanath =

Indian film maker

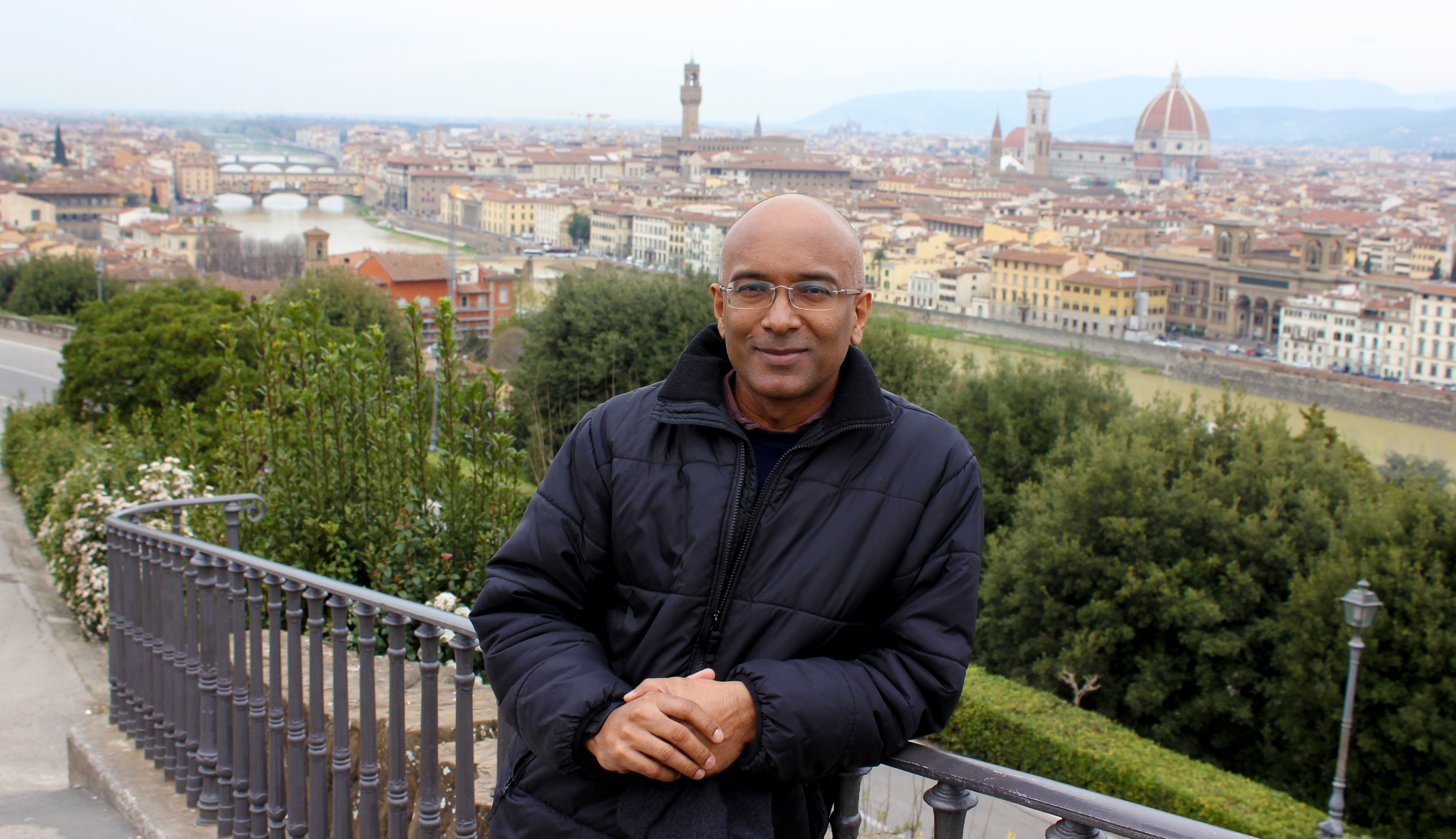
- Occupations: Film Director, Screenwriter, Director of Photography, Film Editor
- Website: www.bijuviswanath.com

Biju Viswanath is an Indian film director, director of photography, film editor and screenwriter. Across various genres, he has made numerous films in different languages, notably, English, Tamil, Malayalam, Irish, Swahili and Urdu.

He has also served as the jury member 50th National film Awards of India in 2003 and Kerala State Awards in 2003

== Career ==
Viswanath's directorial debut A Voyage is based on the works of Indian writer M. T. Vasudevan Nair, which was produced by veteran Malayalam screenwriter John Paul Puthusery. The movie premiered in Busan International Film Festival, and won the gold medal for Best Short Film in India as well as an Honourable Mention in Zanzibar International Film Festival.

His Urdu film Parwaaz (The Flight) won Special Prize in Patras Film Festival.

His English feature film Déjà vu, which was produced by editor A. Sreekar Prasad, featuring various British actors, had its international premiere at Busan International Film Festival in 2001 and at the 54th Locarno International Film Festival. Another feature film of his,Viola, won Golden palm in the Mexico International Film festival.

Viswanath made three Irish films based on the works on the poet writer Celia de Fréine.

His first American feature film Marathon is based on the true story of American poet William Morris Meredith, Jr. Viswanath won two awards for the film: Best Cinematography and Best Screenplay in New York Independent Film Festival.

Viswanath's venture in Swahili is Shadow Tree, a film which was shot in Zanzibar, Tanzania. The film won the Special Award in Skepto Film Festival in Italy.

His Indian Tamil-language feature film Orange Mittai was co-written and produced by Vijay Sethupathi. Another Tamil drama film Chennai Palani Mars won two awards in USA: Grand Jury prize at the Los Angeles Motion Picture Film Festival and the Best Narrative Feature at the Pinnacle Film Awards.

== Filmography ==
=== Feature films ===
Year	Film	Director	Cinematographer	Editor	Language	Notes
1995	Peter Scott	Yes			Malayalam	
2001	Déjà vu	Yes	Yes		English	
2002	Phantom		Yes		Malayalam	
2005	Sulanga		Yes		Sinhala	
2006	Grand Festival	Yes			Hindi; English	
2006	Poi		Yes		Tamil	
2010	Marathon	Yes			English	
2011	Viola	Yes			English	
2012	The Nail	Yes			English	
2013	Mafiosi	Yes			Italian	
2015	Orange Mittai	Yes	Yes	Yes	Tamil	
2019	Chennai Palani Mars	Yes	Yes	Yes	Tamil	
2021	Transcendental Layover	Yes			English	
2022	How to make F**kd Up Movies	Yes			English	
2022	Covid Karma	Yes			English	
2025	Pakuthi Kadal Kadannu	Yes			Malayalam	

=== Short films ===
Year	Film	Language	Notes
1998	A Voyage	Silent	
2004	Second Coming	English	
2005	Zodiac Tales	English	
2006	Sign of Four	English	
2007	Lorg	Irish	
2008	Parwaaz	Urdu	
2008	Rian	Irish	
2009	Oshizemi	Japanese	
2013	Shadow Tree	Swahili	
2014	Thief and Wind Chime	Tamil	
2017	Living is Easy	English	

=== Television ===
Year	Film	Language	Notes
2000	O. Henry Stories	Malayalam	

== Awards ==
- 2009: Best Cinematography at New York City International Film Festival: Marathon
- 2011: Golden Palm Award at Mexico International Film Festival: Viola
- 2014: SIGNIS Award for Best Short Film at Zanzibar International Film Festival and Avant-guarde & Experimental Special Award at Skepto Film Festival: Shadow Tree
- 2019: Gold Award for Best Feature Film at Pinnacle Film Awards: Chennai Palani Mars
- 2022: Best of Show and Best Feature Documentary at Pinnacle Film Awards: How to make F**ked Up Movies
