= Under My Skin (Blue System song) =

Single by Blue System

from the album Body Heat
- Released: 1988
- Label: Hansa
- Songwriter(s): Dieter Bohlen
- Producer(s): Dieter Bohlen; Luis Rodríguez

Blue System singles chronology
"My Bed Is Too Big" (1988)	"Under My Skin" (1988)	"Silent Water" (1989)

Music video
- "Under My Skin" on YouTube

"Under My Skin" is a song by Blue System. It is the first track on their 1988 second studio album, Body Heat, and was released as its second lead single.

The single debuted at number 57 in West Germany for the week of 24 October 1988, and peaked at number 6 three weeks later.

== Composition ==
The song is written and produced by Dieter Bohlen.

== Charts ==
Chart (1988–1989)	Peak position
Austria (Ö3 Austria Top 40)	12
Switzerland (Schweizer Hitparade)	18
West Germany (GfK)	6
