= Here I Am (Blue System album) =

Album of Blue System

Studio album by Blue System
- Released: November 17, 1997
- Recorded: 1997
- Genre: Europop, Eurodance
- Length: 40:12
- Label: BMG, Hansa
- Producer: Dieter Bohlen

Blue System chronology
Body to Body (1996)	Here I Am (1997)	Dieter: Der Film (2006)

Professional ratings
Review scores
Source	Rating
AllMusic	link

Here I Am is the thirteenth and last album of Blue System. It was published in 1997 by BMG Ariola and was produced by Dieter Bohlen. The album contains 11 new tracks. There were two single releases: "Anything" (November 1997) and "Love Will Drive Me Crazy" (January 1998).

== Track listing ==
All tracks written by Dieter Bohlen

#	Title	Length
1.	"Love Will Drive Me Crazy"	3:35
2.	"Anything"	3:42
3.	"I Miss You"	3:47
4.	"I Love the Way You Are"	4:36
5.	"Don't Do That"	3:45
6.	"Baby Believe Me"	3:39
7.	"You Are Lyin"	3:47
8.	"C'est la vie"	3:25
9.	"Every Day, Every Night"	3:31
10.	"Shame Shame Shame"	3:40
11.	"I Believe You Are an Angel"	4:01

== Charts ==
Chart (1997)	Peak position
German Albums	38
Polish Albums	34
