= Love Is Such a Lonely Sword =

Single by Blue System

from the album Obsession
- Released: 1990
- Label: Hansa
- Songwriter(s): Dieter Bohlen
- Producer(s): Dieter Bohlen

Blue System singles chronology
"48 Hours" (1990)	"Love Is Such a Lonely Sword" (1990)	"When Sarah Smiles" (1990)

Music video
- "Love Is Such a Lonely Sword" on YouTube

"Love Is Such a Lonely Sword" is a song by Blue System. It is the first track on their 1990 fourth studio album, Obsession, and was released as its second lead single a couple of months prior.

The single debuted at number 65 in Germany for the week of September 10, 1990, peaking at number 16 seven weeks later.

The song has a vocal appearance by Audrey Motaung.

== Composition ==
The song is written and produced by Dieter Bohlen.

== Charts ==
Chart (1990)	Peak position
Austria (Ö3 Austria Top 40)	13
Europe (Eurochart Hot 100)	71
Germany (GfK)	16
