= Deja Voodoo =

Deja Voodoo may refer to:

- Deja Voodoo (Canadian band), a 1980s garage band
- Deja Voodoo (New Zealand band), a rock band from Auckland
- Déjà Voodoo (Gov't Mule album), 2004
- Déjà Voodoo, an album, or the title song, by Heavy Stereo, 1996
- De-jah Voodoo, an album by Dread Zeppelin, 2000
- "Déjà Voodoo", a song by Kenny Wayne Shepherd from Ledbetter Heights
- "Deja Voodoo" (Dead Zone), a television episode

== See also ==
- Déjà vu (disambiguation)
