= Magic Symphony =

Single by Blue System

from the album Twilight
- Released: 28 August 1989
- Length: 3:35 (radio edit)
- Label: BMG; Ariola
- Songwriter(s): Dieter Bohlen
- Producer(s): Dieter Bohlen

Blue System singles chronology
"Love Suite" (remix '89) (1989)	"Magic Symphony" (1989)	"Love Me on the Rocks" (1989)

Music video
- "Magic Symphony" on YouTube

"Magic Symphony" is the first single from the Blue System's third studio album, Twilight. It was published in 1989 by Hanseatic M.V. and was distributed by BMG. The song was written, arranged and produced by Dieter Bohlen, and co-produced by Luis Rodríguez.

== Track listing ==
- 12″ maxi
1. "Magic Symphony" (long version) – 5:31
2. "Magic Symphony" (radio version) – 3:35
3. "Magic Symphony" (instrumental) – 3:35
- 7″ single
1. "Magic Symphony" – 3:35
2. "Magic Symphony" (instrumental) – 3:35

== Charts ==
Chart (1989)	Peak position
Austria (Ö3 Austria Top 40)	23
Germany (GfK)	10
Switzerland (Schweizer Hitparade)	21
