= Chennai Palani Mars =

2019 Indian drama film by Biju Viswanath

- Theatrical release poster
- Directed by: Biju Viswanath
- Written by: Biju Viswanath; Vijay Sethupathi (dialogues)
- Produced by: Biju Viswanath; Vijay Sethupathi
- Starring: Praveen Raja; Rajesh Giriprasad; Vasant Marimuthu
- Cinematography: Biju Viswanath
- Edited by: Biju Viswanath
- Music by: Niranjan Babu
- Production companies: Orange Mittai Productions; Vijay Sethupathi Productions
- Release date: 26 July 2019
- Country: India
- Language: Tamil

Chennai Palani Mars is a 2019 Indian Tamil-language black comedy-drama film co-written, co-produced and directed by Biju Viswanath. The film is also co-written and co-produced by Vijay Sethupathi under his own production house. It stars Praveen Raja and Rajesh Giriprasad in the lead roles, alongside a cast featuring predominantly newcomers.

The film narrates the story of a cocaine addict who sets off on a road trip with a fellow junkie to realise his dream of reaching Mars via Chennai and Palani, after pinning hopes on a scientifically unstable concept. Featuring music composed by Niranjan Babu, the film was released on 26 July 2019.

== Cast ==
- Praveen Raja as Aakash
- Rajesh Giriprasad as Aandava Perumal
- Vasant Marimuthu as Thiruparkadal Kannan
- A. Ravikumar as Velu
- Pari Elavazhagan as Karthik Krishnamurthy
- R. Krishnamoorthy as Professor
- Madhankumar Dakshinamoorthy as Don 1
- Vin Haadri as Don 2
- Imthias Mohammed as Driver
- K. A. Manigandan as Anand
- Allwin Ramaiah as Kuruvi
- Dr. Venkat Narayanan as Doctor
- Raja as Receptionist
- Sasi Saravanan as Drunkard
- Ruskin Paulraj as Vaithiyar
- K. Parthiban as CI Pandian
- Raj V. Harish as Guitarist
- Maniarasan as Pastor
- Lakshmi Gandhan as Tea Shop Lunatic
- Yogi Ramchandar as Vaidiyar Vaidyalingam
- Kamal as Tea Master
- Renu as Bullock Cart Guy
- Pachaiyappan as Servant
- Master Mayukh Vasant as Young Aakash

== Production ==
The film was publicly announced after the shoot had been completed during May 2019. Described as a rural comedy with a space connection, the film was jointly produced and written by Biju Viswanath and Vijay Sethupathi, who had earlier worked together in Orange Mittai (2015). As the actors were all newcomers, Biju gave them an acting workshop and shot scenes in handycam first before embarking on the shoot.

== Soundtrack ==
The film's soundtrack was composed by Niranjan Babu and lyrics written by Vignesh Jeyapal.

- "Kanavil Kanda Paathai" – Rajesh Giriprasad
- "Vaanam Keezha" – Rajesh Giriprasad
- "Ithanai Neelam Vaanam" – Rajesh Giriprasad, Niranjan Babu
- "Vaanam Sumanda Megham" – Sujay Iswarian Isaac DP
- "Tholaiyaadha Ondrai" – Anila Rajeev
- "Seesame" – Anila Rajeev
- "Song of Universe" – Haritha

== Release ==
The film won two international awards – the Best Narrative Platinum award at Pinnacle Film Awards, and Best Drama Grand Jury Gold award at the Los Angeles Film Festival. The film had its theatrical release on 26 July 2019. It was released on ZEE5 on 8 May 2020.

== Critical reception ==
Baradwaj Rangan, writing for Film Companion, praised the film for it unconventional approach, "If you can catch the film’s vibe, it’s a trip". Pradeep Kumar from The Hindu wrote it a "bold first attempt at experimental film-making". S Subhakeerthana from The Indian Express stated "what started off on a promising note, turns into an uninspiring story, eventually", suggesting it was an "experiment gone awry", giving it 1.5 stars out of 5. Arunkumar Shekhar from The New Indian Express wrote "Chennai Palani Mars, for all its faults, is one of the most outlandish films that has been written, shot and presented to the Tamil cinema audience in quite some time", adding it was an "outlandish travelogue that quickly runs out of fuel".
