= Seeds of Heaven =

Studio album by Blue System
- Released: 12 April 1991
- Recorded: 1990
- Genre: Europop
- Length: 37:16
- Label: BMG
- Producer: Dieter Bohlen; Luis Rodríguez

Blue System chronology
Obsession (1990)	Seeds of Heaven (1991)	Déjà vu (1991)

Seeds of Heaven is the fifth album of Blue System. It was published in 1991 by BMG Ariola and was produced by Dieter Bohlen. The album contains 10 new tracks.

== Track listing ==
1. "La Serenata (Overture)" – 1:36
2. "Lucifer" – 3:16
3. "Testamente D'Amelia" – 5:07
4. "Is She Really Going Out with Him?" – 3:18
5. "Read My Lips" – 4:05
6. "Is It a Shame" – 3:38
7. "Sad Girl in the Sunset" – 4:35
8. "Lisa Said..." – 5:05
9. "The Wind Cries (Who Killed Norma Jean)" – 3:58
10. "Don't Tell Me..." – 3:55

== Charts ==
=== Weekly charts ===
Chart (1991)	Peak position
Austrian Albums (Ö3 Austria)	12
German Albums (Offizielle Top 100)	11

=== Year-end charts ===
Chart (1991)	Position
German Albums (Offizielle Top 100)	66
