= Love Suite =

"Love Suite" (remix '89)

Single by Blue System

from the album Body Heat
- Released: 1989
- Label: Hansa
- Songwriter(s): Dieter Bohlen
- Producer(s): Dieter Bohlen

Blue System singles chronology
"Silent Water" (1989)	"Love Suite" (remix '89) (1989)	"Magic Symphony" (1989)

Music video
- "Love Suite" on YouTube

"Love Suite" is a song by Blue System. It is the fourth track on their 1988 second studio album, Body Heat. A remixed version of the song was released as a single in the spring of 1989.

The single debuted at number 74 in West Germany for the week of 10 April 1989, peaking at number 14 three weeks later.

== Composition ==
The song is written and produced by Dieter Bohlen.

== Charts ==
Chart (1989)	Peak position
West Germany (GfK)	14
