= Old School (Brooklyn Nine-Nine) =

- Brooklyn Nine-Nine episode
- Episode no.: Season 1 Episode 8
- Directed by: Beth McCarthy-Miller
- Written by: Gabe Liedman
- Cinematography by: Giovani Lampassi
- Editing by: Cortney Carrillo
- Production code: 109
- Original air date: November 12, 2013
- Running time: 22 minutes

Guest appearances
- Stacy Keach as Jimmy Brogan; Jerry Minor as Jeremy Grundhaven; Dirk Blocker as Michael Hitchcock; Joel McKinnon Miller as Norman Scully

Episode chronology
← Previous "48 Hours"	Next → "Sal's Pizza"
- Brooklyn Nine-Nine season 1

"Old School" is the eighth episode of the first season of the American television police sitcom series Brooklyn Nine-Nine. It is the 8th overall episode of the series and is written by Gabe Liedman and directed by Beth McCarthy-Miller. It aired on Fox in the United States on November 12, 2013. It was the eighth episode to be broadcast but the ninth episode to be produced.

In the episode, Peralta meets an idol from his childhood, police journalist Jimmy Brogan (Stacy Keach), whose book The Squad made Peralta want to be a cop. However, his recklessness ends up threatening the precinct's reputation. Meanwhile, Charles Boyle (Joe Lo Truglio) and Terry Jeffords (Terry Crews) coach Rosa Diaz (Stephanie Beatriz) on her courtroom demeanor. The episode was seen by an estimated 3.26 million household viewers and gained a 1.4/4 ratings share among adults aged 18–49, according to Nielsen Media Research. It received mostly positive reviews from critics, who praised Keach's performance as well as Jake's character development.

== Plot ==
In the cold open, the squad members steal Scully's smelly shoes from him while he's asleep and blow them up outside, only for the explosion to make the smell worse.

Jimmy Brogan, a journalist and former author of police novels in the 1970s, is visiting the precinct to research an article on how the NYPD has changed since the 1970s. Jake Peralta is a big fan of the books; they inspired him to become a detective. However, he fails to impress Brogan, who shows no interest in the modern environment and the new route the precinct has taken, disparaging Peralta and Amy Santiago as "hair bags". Meanwhile, Rosa is scheduled to give testimony in an assault case, and Terry and Charles are concerned about how she comes across to juries. They try to change her demeanor to make her less abrasive in court but are unsuccessful.

Despite Captain Holt's admonishment that the "good old days" that Brogan writes about were rife with sexism, homophobia, and racism, Peralta continues to try to win Brogan over. The two spend a night getting drunk at Shaw's, and the next day, an extremely hungover Peralta discovers that Brogan has plans to use quotes from their conversation in his article, including criticism of Holt that may damage the captain's reputation. Peralta meets with Brogan to try and convince him not to publish the offending remarks, and returns having punched him in the face.

In court, Rosa struggles to appear less confrontational, but finds it difficult in the face of a particularly provocative defense attorney. Charles tells her to go to a 'happy place', which works, and she is able to give convincing testimony that results in a conviction. Later, when she reveals her 'happy place' was imagining a graphically violent encounter with the defense attorney, Terry schedules her for a psych evaluation.

Holt is furious with Peralta for his assault on Brogan, and nearly suspends him. Later, however, Santiago tells him the whole story: Brogan agreed not to publish the quotes, but when Peralta was complimentary towards Holt, Brogan called Holt a homophobic slur, at which point Peralta punched him out. Holt softens at this and implicitly lets Peralta know that he is okay with what happened. Having seen Brogan's true colors, Peralta stops admiring him, and the Nine-Nine blows up Jake's prized copy of Brogan's The Squad the same way they blew up Scully's shoes earlier in the episode.

== Reception ==
=== Viewers ===
In its original American broadcast, "Old School" was seen by an estimated 3.26 million household viewers and gained a 1.4/4 ratings share among adults aged 18–49, according to Nielsen Media Research. This was a 16% decrease in viewership from the previous episode, which was watched by 3.84 million viewers with a 1.6/4 in the 18-49 demographics. This means that 1.4 percent of all households with televisions watched the episode, while 4 percent of all households watching television at that time watched it. With these ratings, Brooklyn Nine-Nine was the second most watched show on FOX for the night, beating Dads and The Mindy Project but behind New Girl, fourth on its timeslot and tenth for the night in the 18-49 demographics, behind New Girl, The Goldbergs, The Biggest Loser, Person of Interest, Agents of S.H.I.E.L.D., Chicago Fire, NCIS: Los Angeles, NCIS, and The Voice.

=== Critical reviews ===
"Old School" received mostly positive reviews from critics. Roth Cornet of IGN gave the episode a "great" 8.3 out of 10 and wrote, "Brooklyn Nine-Nine delivered one of its tightest episodes yet with 'Old School'. The group dynamic is really gelling, which has created some room for the writers to introduce new aspects of the characters' personalities and play with the relationships. The A and B storylines were equally entertaining and pretty much everyone – even Hitchcock and Scully – were given something to do. With the exception of Linetti of course, who wasn't in this episode, sadly. Stacy Keach made for an ideal foil and was entirely believable as an 'old-guard' beat reporter. The tone was mostly salty, with just the right amount of sweet – what with Peralta defending Holt's honor and appreciating Santiago's abnormally warm butt. He's got a soft side after all. More importantly, like Santiago, I think we’re all really starting to be able to read Holt. His little half smile spoke volumes"

Molly Eichel of The A.V. Club gave the episode an "A−" grade and wrote, "'Old School' wasn't just funny in the big, broad moments, but in the smaller ones too. The facial reactions in this episode were exemplary, especially from Andre Braugher and Melissa Fumero. The former didn't play a large part in the episode, but he did what he could in the subtle moments when the viewer is supposed to be paying attention to the joke. The camera work in this episode was also particularly fun, especially in the beginning: the close-up of Boyle in full on bomb squad gear as he, looking absolutely terrified, tries to take Scully's shoes, or the quick pan from Peralta to Santiago after Boyle comments on Peralta's quick virginity loss story. It's sign of great maturation of the series, and I hope it continues on this path."

Alan Sepinwall of HitFix wrote, "Couple that with a B-story about Terry and Charles coaching Rosa about her courtroom demeanor that used all three characters well (and continued the Schur/Goor trend from 'Parks and Rec' of funny montages of people trying on strange outfits) and didn't overstay its welcome, and you've got another promising outing for the rookie comedy." Aaron Channon of Paste gave the episode an 8.8 out of 10 and wrote, "All of this was wrapped inside an episode that included great hangover humor ('Ughhh, my whole body has drymouth'), advancement of the Rosa-Charles dynamic, which could warrant another recap by itself, tiny nuggets of inside-joke goodness and a not-unsubtle Die Hard reference (again highlighting the writers' supreme understanding of the genre). It was Brooklyn Nine-Nine's best episode yet and the one that elevates it from an enjoyable new fall sitcom to must-watch TV (as much as any network television show can invoke such an imperative)."
