= Lucifer (Blue System song) =

Single by Blue System

from the album Seeds of Heaven
- Released: 1991
- Label: Hansa
- Songwriter(s): Dieter Bohlen
- Producer(s): Dieter Bohlen

Blue System singles chronology
"When Sarah Smiles" (1990)	"Lucifer" (1991)	"Testamente d'Amelia" (1991)

Music video
- "Lucifer" (ZDF, 1991) on YouTube

"Lucifer" is a song by Blue System. It is the first (not counting an "overture") song on their 1991 fifth studio album, Seeds of Heaven, and was released as its lead single.

The single debuted at number 91 in Germany for the week of April 15, 1991, re-entered at number 25 two weeks later and stayed there for one more week before dropping to number 26.

== Composition ==
The song is written and produced by Dieter Bohlen.

== Charts ==
Chart (1991)	Peak position
Austria (Ö3 Austria Top 40)	8
Germany (GfK)	25
