= 6 Years – 6 Nights =

Single by Blue System

from the album 21st Century
- Released: 1994
- Label: Hansa
- Songwriter(s): Dieter Bohlen
- Producer(s): Dieter Bohlen

Blue System singles chronology
"Operator" (1993)	"6 Years – 6 Nights" (1994)	"That's Love" (1994)

Music video
- "6 Years – 6 Nights" on YouTube

"6 Years – 6 Nights" is a song by Blue System. It is the first track on their 1994 ninth studio album, 21st Century, and was released as its lead single.

The single debuted at number 96 in Germany for the week of March 28, 1994, two weeks later re-entering at number 47, which would remain its highest position.

== Composition ==
The song is written and produced by Dieter Bohlen.

== Charts ==
Chart (1994)	Peak position
Germany (GfK)	47
