= Deja Vu All Over Again =

Deja Vu All Over Again or It's Like Déjà Vu All Over Again may refer to:

- "It's like déjà vu all over again", a famous quotation attributed to Yogi Berra:
- Deja Vu All Over Again (album), an album by John Fogerty
- Deja Vu All Over Again/The Best of T. Graham Brown, an album by T. Graham Brown
- "Déjà Vu All Over Again", an episode of Charmed
- "Déjà Vu All Over Again", an episode of Elementary
- "Déjà Vu All Over Again", an episode of La Femme Nikita
- "Déjà Vu All Over Again", an episode of Seven Days
- "Déjà Vu All Over Again", an episode of Shark
- "Déjà Vu All Over Again", an episode of Xena: Warrior Princess
- "It's Like Déjà Vu All Over Again", an episode of Pretty Little Liars
- "It's Like Déjà Vu All Over Again", an episode of NCIS
- "It's Like Déjà Vu All Over Again", an episode of Stick
- "Déja Vu All Over Again", an episode of Medium
- "It's Like Déjà Vu All Over Again", episode 96 of Naruto "Deadlock! Sannin Showdown!"
