= Deja (given name) =

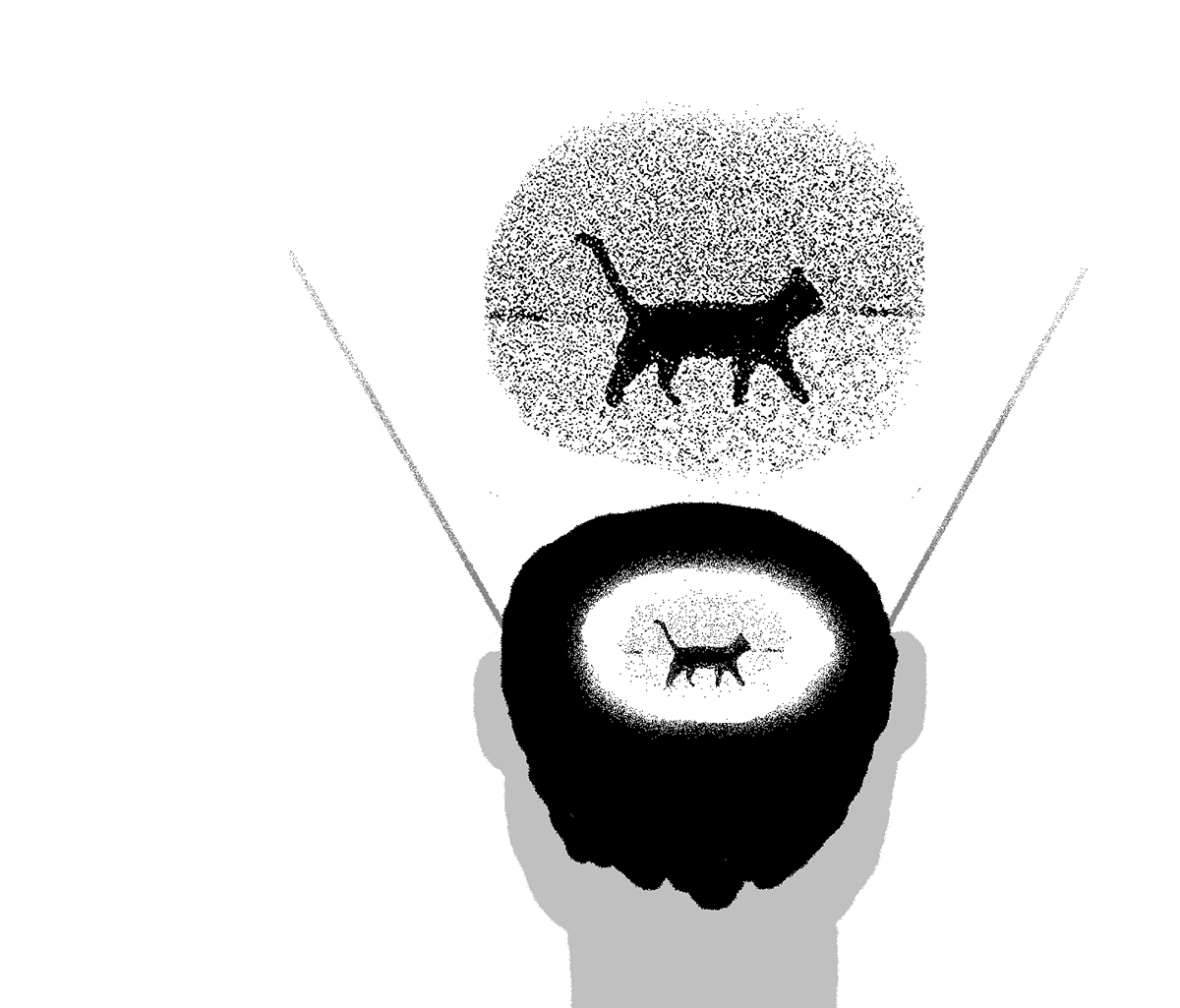
- The name Deja is often given in reference to the French term Déjà vu, meaning the feeling that something has been seen before.
- Pronunciation: DAY-zhə or DEE-jə
- Gender: Female

Origin
- Origin: French
- Meaning: before
- Region of origin: France

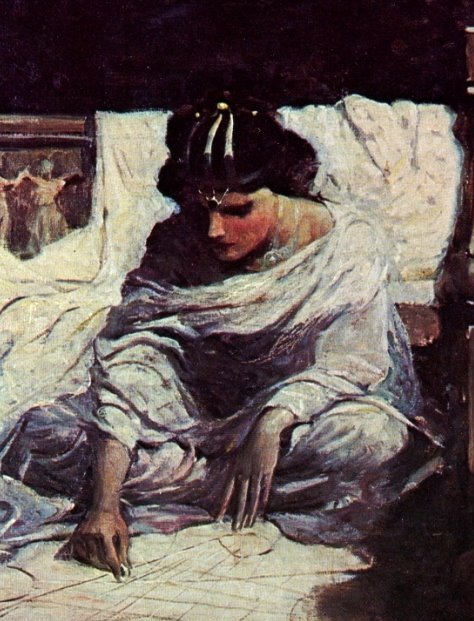
Dejah Thoris

Deja or Déja or Dejah is a feminine given name sometimes given in reference to the French word déjà, meaning before. Spelling variants such as Daja and Dajah and elaborations such as Dejanae and Dejanelle, also with multiple spelling variants, are also in use. Déjà vu is a French term referring to the feeling that one has seen events before. In some instances, the name may be derived from a short form of Dejanira. Dejah Thoris is a character in Edgar Rice Burroughs' series of Martian early-20th-century science fiction novels. It is also a surname with various origins in multiple languages.

== Usage ==
The name ranked among the top 1,000 names for newborn girls in the United States between 1988 and 2009.

== People named Deja ==
- Déja J Bowens, British actress and singer
- Deja Foxx (born 2000), American reproductive rights activist, political strategist, and blogger
- Deja Kelly (born 2001), American college basketball player
- Deja Perkins, American urban ecologist
- Deja Trimble (born 1991), American rapper, singer, and songwriter known professionally as Dej Loaf
- Deja Young (born 1996), American Paralympic athlete

== People named Dejah ==
- Dejah Mulipola (born 1998), American professional softball catcher

== Fictional characters ==
- Dejah Thoris, a character in Edgar Rice Burroughs' Martian novels
- Dejah Thoris "Deety" Burroughs Carter, a character in Robert A. Heinlein's The Number of the Beast and The Pursuit of the Pankera
- Deja, a character in the 1995 film Higher Learning

== See also ==
- DeJa Skye, stage name of American drag performer Willie Redman
