= Only with You (Blue System song) =

Single by Blue System

from the album Body to Body
- Released: May 28, 1996
- Recorded: 1995
- Genre: Synthpop
- Length: Radio Version: 3:22 Extended Version: 5:15
- Label: BMG; Ariola
- Songwriter: Dieter Bohlen
- Producer: Dieter Bohlen

Blue System singles chronology
"Laila" (1995)	"Only with You" (1996)	"For the Children" (1996)

"Only With You" is the first single from the twelfth Blue System album, Body to Body. Was published in 1995 by Hanseatic M.V. and was distributed by BMG. The lyrics, music, arrangements and production were made by Dieter Bohlen.

== Track listing ==
CD-Maxi Hansa 74321 37368 2 (BMG) / EAN 0743213736822 28.05.1996

1. Only With You (Radio Version) - 3:22
2. Only With You (Extended Version) - 5:15
3. Only With You (Labadi Club Mix) - 5:00

== Charts ==
Chart (1996)	Peak position
Germany	58
