= It's All Over (Blue System & Dionne Warwick song) =

Single by Blue System & Dionne Warwick

from the album Déjà vu
- Released: 25 November 1991
- Recorded: 1991
- Genre: Synthpop
- Length: 3:44
- Label: BMG; Ariola
- Songwriter(s): Dieter Bohlen
- Producer(s): Dieter Bohlen; Luis Rodriguez

Blue System singles chronology
"Déjà vu" (1991)	"It's All Over" (1991)	"Romeo and Juliet" (1992)

"It's All Over" is a song by American singer Dionne Warwick and German pop group Blue System, taken from their sixth studio album Déjà vu (1991). It was written by Dieter Bohlen, the lead singer of Blue System, and co-produced by Bohlen and Luis Rodríguez.

== Writing and recording ==
Dieter Bohlen wrote "It's All Over" for Dionne Warwick after seeing her performing with Burt Bacharach in Las Vegas in 1989. Bohlen stated that he wanted to compose a "monumental opus" similar to her earlier hit "Heartbreaker", complete with a full orchestra and solo harmonica. The backing track was recorded in Germany, and cost 20,000 Deutsche marks to produce. He mailed the demo to Warwick's manager, Clive Davis. Once he accepted, Bohlen requested that the song be recorded as a duet. The vocals were recorded at Lion Share Recording Studios in Los Angeles.

== Release and promotion ==
The title track from Déjà vu was released as the album's lead single in September 1991. It spent fourteen weeks in the German Top 100 Singles chart, peaking at no. 12. "It's All Over" was released as the follow-up single in November 1991 and peaked in its first week at no. 60. Bohlen recollected that he and Warwick had performed the song live on a TV show shortly after the track's release, and noted the audience's lukewarm response to the song.

== Track listing ==
CD-Maxi Hansa 664 953 25.11.1991

1. It's All Over (Radio Version) - 3:37
2. Blue System - Mrs. Jones - 4:05
3. It's All Over (Long Version) - 5:48
4. It's All Over (Instrumental) - 3:37

7" Single Hansa 114 953 25.11.1991

1. It's All Over (Radio Version) - 3:37
2. Blue System - Mrs. Jones - 4:05

12" Maxi Hansa 614 953 25.11.1991

1. It's All Over (Radio Version) - 3:37
2. It's All Over (Long Version) - 5:48
3. Blue System - Mrs. Jones - 4:05
4. It's All Over (Instrumental) - 3:37

== Charts ==
Chart (1991)	Peak position
Germany (GfK)	60
