= Hello America (album) =

Studio album by Blue System
- Released: 23 March 1992
- Recorded: 1991
- Genre: Europop
- Length: 37:16
- Label: BMG
- Producer: Dieter Bohlen; Luis Rodríguez

Blue System chronology
Déjà Vu (1991)	Hello America (1992)	Backstreet Dreams (1993)

Hello America is the seventh album by Blue System. It was edited in 1992 under the label BMG Ariola and was produced by Dieter Bohlen. The album contains 11 new tracks. "I Will Survive" and "Romeo and Juliet" were released as singles from the album.

== Track listing ==
All tracks written by Dieter Bohlen

#	Title	Length
1.	"Romeo and Juliet"	3:52
2.	"Crossing The River"	4:03
3.	"I Will Survive"	3:40
4.	"I Like Your Sexy Body"	3:28
5.	"Satellite To Satellite"	3:43
6.	"Hello America"	3:58
7.	"Vampire"	3:37
8.	"Wonderful World"	3:44
9.	"Heartache No. 9"	3:37
10.	"Unfinished Rhapsodie"	3:22
11.	"Final"	4:03

== Charts ==
Chart (1992)	Peak position
Austrian Albums	21
Czech Albums	13
German Albums	29
Hungarian Albums (MAHASZ)	34
