= Headkase =

Australian band

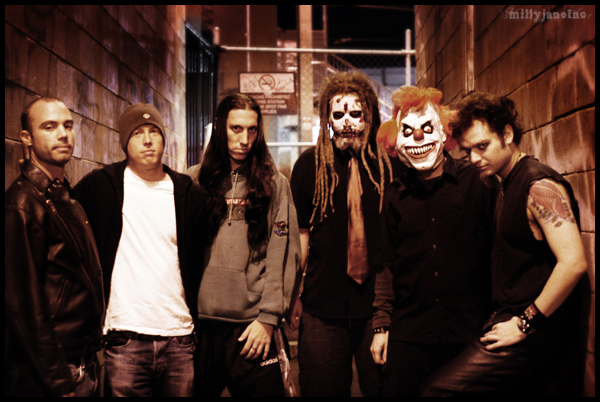

Background information
- Origin: Brisbane, Queensland, Australia
- Genres: Avant-garde metal, shock rock, nu metal
- Years active: 2001–2014
- Members: Todd Hansen; Brett Hansen; Raleigh Valemont; Tristan Sykes; Dylan DK Star; Nutty Dotforest

Headkase was an Australian avant-garde metal band from Brisbane, Queensland, formed in 2001. Headkase consisted of six members, and are known for theatrical and energetic stage shows, circus-themed masks and facepaint. Often compared to acts like Mr. Bungle, the band combined many musical styles such as metal, jazz, techno, salsa, swing, and circus music.

== History ==
After forming in early 2001, Headkase self-released a demo/EP titled The Beginning and eventually went on to open for such touring acts as Hed PE, Killing Joke, Skinlab, Jerk, Blood Duster, Devolved and Testeagles. Their full-length studio album The Worm County Circus was released in early 2009. The album was well received outside of Australia, with US magazine "Infernal Masquerade" describing it as "one of the most interesting albums of this year". According to their Facebook page, they officially disbanded in 2014. Reasons for the band disbanding are unknown, however drummer Todd Hansen has gone on to play for Melbourne outfit King Parrot. Vocalist Nathan "Nutty" Spotswood has been residing in Melbourne, Vic since 2010. Keyboardist Brett Hansen runs a puppet show business called Larrikin Puppets in Brisbane, Qld with the main star of the show, Troggg. The Headkase Facebook page continues to publish posts as of 2019.

=== Australian tour ===
The 2010 Australian tour brought Headkase to audiences in Adelaide, Sydney, Newcastle, Melbourne, Brisbane and the Gold Coast. The band performed alongside Todd Hansen's Adelaide-based band KcaveMen in every city.

== Members ==
- Nathan 'Nutty' Spotswood – vocals (2001–2014)
- Raleigh Valemont – lead guitar (2001–2014)
- Tristan Sykes – rhythm guitar (2001–2014)
- Dylan – bass guitar (2001–2014)
- Todd Hansen – drums/backup vocals (2001–2014)
- Brett Hansen – keyboard (2001–2014)

== Discography ==
Studio albums

- The Worm County Circus (2009)
- The Beginning (2001)

Appearances on compilations

- Appeared on Generation Dead: A Compilation from the Dark Side of Music, released 2010 on Dead Records with their track "Where the Blood May Lead".
- Appeared on Devolution Magazine: Essential Summer Listening, released 2009 by Devolution Magazine in the UK with their track "Cocaine and Caffeine".
- Appeared on Mecha Organa Vol. 2, released 2009 by The Apparatus in the USA with their track "Where the Blood May Lead".
- Appeared on Before the Calm Returns, released 2007 on Before the Calm Returns Records with their track "Murdered and Dumped in the Willow".

Music videos

Year	Video	Director	Original air date
2004	"Where the Blood May Lead"	Dale Hansen	16 January 2004 – Rage
