= Nadja Abd el Farrag =

German television personality (1965–2025)

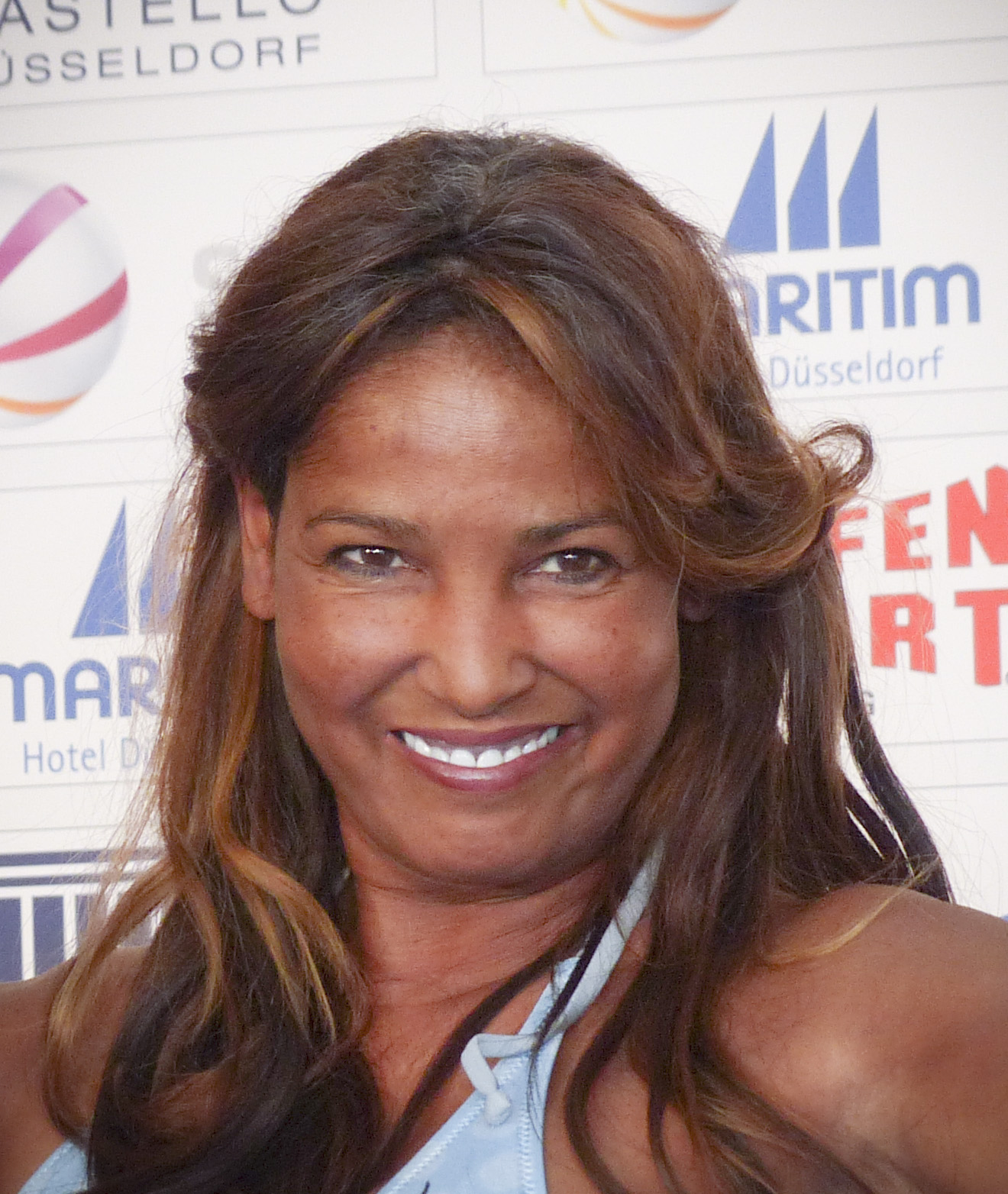
- Abd el Farrag in 2013
- Born: 5 March 1965; Hamburg, West Germany
- Died: 9 May 2025 (aged 60); Hamburg, Germany
- Resting place: Ohlsdorf Cemetery, Hamburg, Germany
- Other name: Naddel
- Occupations: Television personality; presenter; singer
- Years active: 1989–2024
- Partner: Dieter Bohlen (1989–1996; 1997–2001)

Nadja Abd el Farrag (5 March 1965 – 9 May 2025), nicknamed Naddel, was a German television and media personality. She became known through her relationship with songwriter and record producer Dieter Bohlen of Modern Talking.

== Early life ==
Abd el Farrag was born in Hamburg to a Sudanese father, Ibrahim, and a German mother, Uta. She described her father as very strict and was estranged from him for the last 15 years before his death in 2001. She had a younger sister. Abd el Farrag left school a year before the Abitur and later did an apprenticeship as a chemist's assistant and worked in a shop.

== Career ==
In 1989, Abd el Farrag met Dieter Bohlen in Hamburg and became a background vocalist for his project Blue System. During that time, she briefly had a part-time job in a hospice. Abd el Farrag and Bohlen were in a relationship from 1989 to 1996 and from 1997 to 2001. In 1999, she did two photoshoots for the magazine Playboy Germany. From 1999 to 2000, she presented the RTL II erotic-show Peep!

In 2002, Abd el Farrag published a cookbook, which was followed by her autobiography Ungelogen in 2003. Ungelogen details her youth and her relationship with Bohlen, and also contains controversial statements about her former manager Gerd Graf Bernadotte, who sued her to have some passages removed. In 2004, she took part in the second season of Ich bin ein Star – Holt mich hier raus!, the German version of I'm a Celebrity...Get Me Out of Here! In 2005, she was a guest on Big Brother Germany for a week. In 2006, she released the single "Blinder Passagier" with Austrian schlager singer Kurt Elsasser, which was followed by their collaborative album Weiße Pferde in 2007. That same year, they took part in the preselection for the Grand Prix der Volksmusik with the song "Heimat". From 2007 to 2017, her stage-name Naddel was a registered trademark. In 2008, Abd el Farrag also worked as a DJ. In 2009, she advertised for the German erotic company Orion and for the erotic fair Venus Berlin. In 2013, she participated in Promiboxen on Sat.1. In 2016 and 2018, she took part in the RTL show Raus aus den Schulden, presented by debt counselor Peter Zwegat. Also in 2018, she published her second autobiography Achterbahn. Her last public appearance was at Schlagermove on 25 May 2024, after which she retired from the limelight "despite several offers".

== Personal life and death ==
Abd el Farrag and Bohlen had a tumultuous relationship, which she once described as "the mistake of my life". Following their final breakup, media coverage of Abd el Farrag often focussed on her health and financial issues, particularly her alcohol consumption. She was diagnosed with attention deficit hyperactivity disorder (ADHD) as an adult, and she told the German edition of Closer in 2017 that she had liver cirrhosis. On 9 May 2025, she died from multiple organ failure in Hamburg, at the age of 60. She was laid to rest in a small ceremony at the Ohlsdorf Cemetery, where her father Ibrahim is also buried.

== Bibliography ==
- Naddel kocht verführerisch gut, Südwest, Munich 2001, ISBN 3-517-06538-2
- Ungelogen - (K)eine Liebesgeschichte, Herbig, Munich 2003, ISBN 3-7766-2339-X
- Nadja Abd el Farrag, Sybille F. Martin: Achterbahn. Eine Biographie, Obermayer, Buchloe 2018, ISBN 978-3-943037-46-3
