= Déjà vu (Blue System song) =

Single by Blue System

from the album Déjà vu
- Released: 1991
- Label: Hansa
- Songwriter(s): Dieter Bohlen
- Producer(s): Dieter Bohlen

Blue System singles chronology
"Testamente d'Amelia" (1991)	"Déjà vu" (1991)	"It's All Over" (1991)

Music video
- "Déjà vu" (ZDF, 1991) on YouTube

"Déjà vu" is a song by Blue System. It is the first track on their 1991 sixth studio album, Déjà vu, and was released as its lead single.

The single debuted at number 75 in Germany for the week of September 23, 1991, rising to number 14 two weeks later and then peaking at number 12 for two weeks.

== Composition ==
The song is written and produced by Dieter Bohlen.

== Charts ==
Chart (1991)	Peak position
Austria (Ö3 Austria Top 40)	16
Germany (GfK)	12
