= Deja Vu (A.B.'s song) =

Single by AB'S (/A.B.'s)
- A-side: "Deja Vu"
- B-side: "Asian Moon"
- Released: 1984 (UK)
- Recorded: August 1982
- Genre: Instrumental; Pop music
- Label: StreetSounds
- Composer(s): Naoki WATANABE
- Lyricist(s): Yoshihiko ANDO
- Producer(s): AB'S & Toshio OGURI

"Deja Vu" is a 1984 song by the Japanese male group the A.B.'s, released on the StreetSounds label (reference number XKHAN 503). It first charted on 14 April 1984, and it reached number 80 in the British album charts. It remained on the charts for two weeks.

It was the first track on their first studio album, which was also called "AB'S". In Japan, this song was not released as a single. The other tracks on the album were "Dee-Dee-Phone", "Django", "Fill the Sail", "Asian Moon", "In the City Night", "Girl" and "Just You".

The members of the band were Fujimaru Yoshino and Makoto Matsushita on vocals and guitars, Yoshihiko Ando on vocals and keyboards, Naoki Watanabe on vocals and bass, and Atsuo Okamoto on vocals, drums, and percussion.

The album was released on vinyl on 21 January 1983, with the identification MOON-28007 1983. It was later released as a CD, on 21 February 2001, with the identification of AMCM-4521 by Warner Music Group.
