= Body to Body (Blue System album) =

Studio album by Blue System
- Released: 14 October 1996
- Recorded: 1996
- Genre: Eurodance, Europop
- Length: 40:12
- Label: BMG
- Producer: Dieter Bohlen

Blue System chronology
Forever Blue (1995)	Body to Body (1996)	Here I Am (1997)

Singles from Body To Body
- 1. "Only with You" Released: 1996; 2. "Body To Body" Released: 1996; 3. "For The Children" Released: 1996

Body to Body is the twelfth album of Blue System. Was published in 1996 by BMG Ariola and was produced by Dieter Bohlen. The album includes 11 new tracks.

== Track listing ==
All tracks by Dieter Bohlen

#	Title	Length
1.	"Body to Body"	3:27
2.	"Only with You"	3:25
3.	"For the Children"	3:58
4.	"It's For You"	3:22
5.	"Dam, Dam"	4:13
6.	"Can This Be Love"	4:13
7.	"On And On"	3:22
8.	"Freedom"	3:28
9.	"Deeper Deeper"	3:22
10.	"Oh, I Miss You"	3:35
11.	"Thank God, It's Friday Night"	3:17
12.	"If I Can't Have Your Love" (Bonus track feat. Children United)	3:58

== Charts ==
Chart (1996)	Peak position
German Albums	28
Hungarian Albums	40

== Credits ==
- Music: Dieter Bohlen
- Lyrics: Dieter Bohlen
- Lead Vocals: Dieter Bohlen
- Refrains, Chorus: Rolf Kohler
- Arrangements: Dieter Bohlen, except tracks 3, 4, 6 and 10 arranged by Werner Becker
- Producer: Dieter Bohlen
- Recorded at Jeopark by Jeo and Vox Klang Studio
- Distribution: BMG
- Design: Ariola/Achim Natzeck
- Photography: Kramer & Giogoli
