= Déjà Vu (2015 film) =

- Directed by: Huang Wei
- Starring: Liu Yang; Xia Yan; Jampa Tseten
- Production companies: Huang Tai Ji; Chunguang Yinghua（Beijing）Media Co., Ltd
- Distributed by: Beijing Lanjing shengshi Media Co., ltd
- Release date: January 23, 2015
- Running time: 90 minutes
- Country: China
- Language: Mandarin
- Box office: CN¥240,000

Déjà Vu (Chinese: 我要你开花) is a 2015 Chinese comedy film directed by Huang Wei. It was released on January 23, 2015.

== Cast ==
- Liu Yang
- Xia Yan
- Jampa Tseten

== Reception ==
By January 23, the film had earned CN¥240,000 at the Chinese box office.
