= 48 Hours (song) =

Single by Blue System

from the album Obsession
- Released: 1990
- Label: Hansa
- Songwriter(s): Dieter Bohlen
- Producer(s): Dieter Bohlen

Blue System singles chronology
"Love Me on the Rocks" (1989)	"48 Hours" (1990)	"Love Is Such a Lonely Sword" (1990)

Music video
- "48 Hours" on YouTube

"48 Hours" is a song by Blue System. It is the sixth track on their 1990 fourth studio album, Obsession. It was released as a single around six months before the album came out.

The single debuted at number 89 in Germany for the week of April 30, 1990, two weeks later re-entering at number 29, which would remain its highest position.

== Composition ==
The song is written and produced by Dieter Bohlen.

== Charts ==
Chart (1990)	Peak position
Austria (Ö3 Austria Top 40)	28
Germany (GfK)	29
