= Déjà vu (2001 film) =

English-language psychological thriller film

- Directed by: Biju Viswanath
- Written by: Biju Viswanath
- Screenplay by: Laura Andrews
- Produced by: Saïd Alavi; A. Sreekar Prasad
- Starring: Paddy Fletcher; Simon Binns
- Cinematography: Biju Viswanath
- Edited by: A. Sreekar Prasad
- Music by: Sharreth
- Production company: Film Freaks
- Release dates: August 2001 (Locarno Film Festival); November 2001 (Pusan International Film Festival)
- Countries: India; United Kingdom
- Language: English

Déjà vu is a 2001 English-language psychological thriller film directed and co-written by Biju Viswanath and starring Paddy Fletcher and Simon Binns.

== Plot ==
The film is about a frightened man who is trapped in a lighthouse.

== Cast ==
- Paddy Fletcher as the frightened man
- Simon Binns as the stranger

== Production ==
While in Zanzibar for a festival screening of his short film A Voyage, he met a NRI named Saïd Alavi, who agreed to produce the film alongside A. Sreekar Prasad under the banner of Film Freaks. The film stars British actors Paddy Fletcher and Simon Binns. Since the film is about phobias, Fletcher had to face several of his fears including cockroaches, heights and water. The film was shot in Lundi, Goa (including Vengurla lighthouse) and Thiruvananthapuram. The film was shot using a Kodak 5289 800T and a 5246 250D and 90% of the film was shot in low lighting.

== Release ==
The film was selected to be a part of the 54th Locarno Film Festival in August 2001 alongside Lagaan (2001). The film was also screened at Pusan International Film Festival in November of that same year in the New Wave section. The film has been screened at 20 film festivals worldwide.

== Reception ==
A critic from indiainfo.com rated the film 2/5 stars and wrote, "The script written jointly by Laura Andrews and Biju Viswanath sustains the spirit of the movie mainly through two factors, the possession of a knife by the stranger and the strange language spoken by him. These are the two factors, which arouses fear in the lighthouse mechanic besides that police message. Masterly editing by Sreekar Prasad keeps the temper of the movie".
