= 48 Hours (Brooklyn Nine-Nine) =

- Brooklyn Nine-Nine episode
- Episode no.: Season 1 Episode 7
- Directed by: Peter Lauer
- Written by: Luke Del Tredici
- Cinematography by: Giovani Lampassi
- Editing by: Cortney Carrillo
- Production code: 103
- Original air date: November 5, 2013
- Running time: 22 minutes

Guest appearances
- Kid Cudi as Dustin Whitman; Dirk Blocker as Michael Hitchcock; Joel McKinnon Miller as Norm Scully; Andrew Friedman as Gil

Episode chronology
← Previous "Halloween"	Next → "Old School"
- Brooklyn Nine-Nine season 1

"48 Hours" is the seventh episode of the first season of the American television police sitcom series Brooklyn Nine-Nine. It is the 7th overall episode of the series and is written by co-executive producer Luke Del Tredici and directed by Peter Lauer. It aired on Fox in the United States on November 5, 2013. It was the seventh episode to be broadcast but the third episode to be produced.

In this episode, Peralta arrests a man (played by musician Kid Cudi) suspected of robbing a jewelry store after he mocks him. Due to a lack of solid evidence, Peralta has 48 hours to prove the man did the crime or he will be released and the precinct will face a demand. In addition, Terry Jeffords (Terry Crews) has a problem in the shape of his visiting brother-in-law (Jamal Duff) who mocks him for being 'weak', and Charles Boyle (Joe Lo Truglio) judges a pie contest between Rosa Diaz (Stephanie Beatriz) and Gina Linetti (Chelsea Peretti).

The episode was seen by an estimated 3.84 million household viewers and gained a 1.6/4 ratings share among adults aged 18–49, according to Nielsen Media Research. The episode received positive reviews from critics, who praised the episode's bottle structure, character dynamic and the performances of Samberg and Braugher; however some critics expressed a wish for some character development for Jake.

== Plot ==
Jake Peralta (Andy Samberg) informs Holt (Andre Braugher) that he just conducted an investigation into a jewelry store robbery and found a suspect in the case, Dustin Whitman (Kid Cudi). Earlier, Whitman mocked and upset Peralta. Despite lack of proper evidence, Peralta has already arrested Whitman and placed him in jail. Holt tells Peralta that they need firm evidence within 48 hours or Whitman will be released by law.

This causes anger in the precinct, as everyone is forced to spend their weekend at work. Amy Santiago (Melissa Fumero) is especially upset, as she was set to go on a date. Terry Jeffords (Terry Crews) begins showing signs of lacking sleep and working out excessively, which worries Holt. Jeffords informs him that he has been working out ever since his brother-in-law, Zeke (Jamal Duff), has been staying at his house and making him look weak. Meanwhile, Charles Boyle (Joe Lo Truglio) gets involved in a pie-tasting contest between Gina Linetti (Chelsea Peretti) and Rosa Diaz (Stephanie Beatriz) for their respective restaurants. Despite hating Diaz's pie, Boyle lies due to his feelings for her and Gina calls him out for his cowardice.

Peralta sends Norm Scully (Joel McKinnon Miller) to New Jersey to check Whitman's alibi. Unfortunately, the alibi turns out to be true. However, Peralta eventually finds out that Whitman went to prison and had a friend rob the store using Whitman's M.O. This way, Whitman's alibi was ensured. The pair ultimately chose to split the money. This sends Whitman to prison and prevents the precinct from being sued by the District Attorney. Peralta decides to compensate the others for wasting their weekend by covering their shifts (except Santiago's, as he got her her date back). Boyle stands up to both Rosa and Gina by revealing he dislikes both of their pies and brings his favorite pie in, which both Rosa and Gina agree is better than theirs. Zeke visits the precinct and continues making fun of Jeffords. Noticing this, Holt lies about Jeffords leading a raid on the Russian Mafia and makes an attempt to show Jeffords' strength. Holt then lets Jeffords sleep in his office while listening to whale songs.

== Reception ==
=== Viewers ===
In its original American broadcast, "48 Hours" was seen by an estimated 3.84 million household viewers and gained a 1.6/4 ratings share among adults aged 18–49, according to Nielsen Media Research. This was a slight increase in viewership from the previous episode, which was watched by 3.77 million viewers with a 1.6/4 in the 18-49 demographics. This means that 1.6 percent of all households with televisions watched the episode, while 4 percent of all households watching television at that time watched it. With these ratings, Brooklyn Nine-Nine was the second most watched show on FOX for the night, beating Dads and The Mindy Project but behind New Girl, fourth on its timeslot and eight for the night in the 18-49 demographics, behind Person of Interest, New Girl, The Biggest Loser, NCIS: Los Angeles, Agents of S.H.I.E.L.D., NCIS, The Voice.

=== Critical reviews ===
"48 Hours" received positive reviews from critics. Roth Cornet of IGN gave the episode a "great" 8.0 out of 10 and wrote, "48 Hours was another great episode in Brooklyn Nine-Nine's freshman season. The set-up feels familiar, but the jokes just keep getting stronger, as we get to know and love these characters more and more."

Molly Eichel of The A.V. Club gave the episode a "B" grade and wrote, "Despite the structural elements that are as much a season-wide issue (and remember, Brooklyn Nine-Nine is only seven episodes in at this point) as an episodic one, '48 Hours' was packed with genuine laugh lines. In addition, it highlighted the physical comedy of two players that I've mentioned before: Terry and Santiago. Terry's sleep chin ups and episode-ending fall onto Holt's couch were great, but his physicality is not a surprise. Melissa Fumero does most of her acting in her face, and it's quite fun to watch, whether she's trying to get smokey eye tips from an incarcerated prostitute only to discover said lady of the night has an STD rash or she's reacting to the idea of a man whose soul patch tingles for her. Santiago is one of many characters who can be funny, even without revolving around Peralta."

Alan Sepinwall of HitFix wrote, "Cops allegedly love doughnuts, so it's perhaps appropriate that so far, Brooklyn Nine-Nine has been the quintessential example of a doughnut show: delicious and chewy on the perimeter, and offering nothing in the middle." Aaron Channon of Paste gave the episode a 7.1 out of 10 and wrote, "TV viewers often feel profound sadness when their favorite shows end. Beloved characters become part of our lives, and we can occasionally be deeply affected by their fates. Although Brooklyn Nine-Nine's one-week absence did not leave a Tony Soprano-sized hole in my heart, I have to admit I did miss the gang more than expected. Universal affection for several of a series' characters might not necessarily indicate the quality of programming, but there is almost certainly a correlation between it and continued viewership. And it's fortunate that the characters are as likable as they are because '48 Hours' did not inspire a ton of confidence in the future creativity of Brooklyn Nine-Nine's plot lines."
