= Sorry, Little Sarah =

Single by Blue System

from the album Walking on a Rainbow
- B-side: "Big Boys Don't Cry"
- Released: 1987
- Genre: Synth-pop
- Length: 3:35 (radio version)
- Label: BMG Ariola
- Songwriter(s): Dieter Bohlen
- Producer(s): Dieter Bohlen

Blue System singles chronology
"Sorry, Little Sarah" (1987)	"Big Boys Don't Cry" (1988)

Music video
- "Sorry, Little Sarah" on YouTube

"Sorry, Little Sarah" is the first single from Blue System's debut album, Walking on a Rainbow. It was published in 1987 by Hanseatic M.V. and was distributed by BMG. The song was written, arranged and produced by Dieter Bohlen, and co-produced by Luis Rodríguez. This song has a strong bossa nova influence.

What Dieter Bohlen has said about this song, "After Modern Talking, I thought for a long time what I could do now, and we never had a Samba hit in Germany. So it was, for me, a big challenge to write a Samba title."

== Track listing ==
- 7″ single (Hansa 109 469)
1. "Sorry Little Sarah" – 3:35
2. "Big Boys Don't Cry" – 3:11
- 12″ maxi (Hansa 609 469)
1. "Sorry Little Sarah" (long version) – 5:12
2. "Big Boys Don't Cry" (long version) – 5:24
- 12″ maxi (Hansa 609 640)
1. "Sorry Little Sarah" (New York dance mix) – 5:58
2. "Big Boys Don't Cry" (long version) – 5:24

== Charts ==
Chart (1987–1988)	Peak position
Austria (Ö3 Austria Top 40)	10
South Africa (Springbok Radio)	19
Spain (AFYVE)	6
West Germany (GfK)	14
