= Blue System =

German pop group

Background information
- Origin: Germany
- Genres: Pop; Eurodance; Euro disco
- Years active: 1987–1998
- Labels: BMG; ZYX Music USA
- Past members: Dieter Bohlen

Blue System was a German pop group that was founded by Dieter Bohlen in 1987 after the break-up of Modern Talking.

== Career ==
The group consisted of Dieter Bohlen (mastermind creator, composer, writer, producer, mixer, arranger and verse main vocals), and hired backstage musicians Rolf Köhler (chorus main vocals), Michael Scholz (background vocals), Detlef Wiedeke (background vocals) and other background and/or front female voices Tuti Kanta ("Laila", "Only with You"), Marion Schwaiger ("Déjà vu", etc.), Audrey Mountang and Madeleine Lang.

On stage: Joachim Vogel (rhythm guitar), Jeanne Dupuy and Frank Otto (drums), Nadja Abd el Farrag (vocals). In 1988 Frank Otto was replaced by Michel Rollin. After that in 1991 a new keyboardist joined for live shows – Achim Strieben. In TV shows and videos he was replaced by Friedrich Graner (Sir Fritz), who remained a part of the group until the break-up in 1998. In 1992 Dirk Sauer, Rene Engelman and Wolfgang Fritsch joined the group, while Joachim Vogel left.

Some of the group's singles such as "Sorry, Little Sarah" or "My Bed Is Too Big" achieved moderate success in Europe. The group released 22 video clips from their album repertoire and most of these were aired in Europe, especially on German TV shows. Blue System also had several concert performances in Russia during the late 80s and early 90s.

== List of band members ==
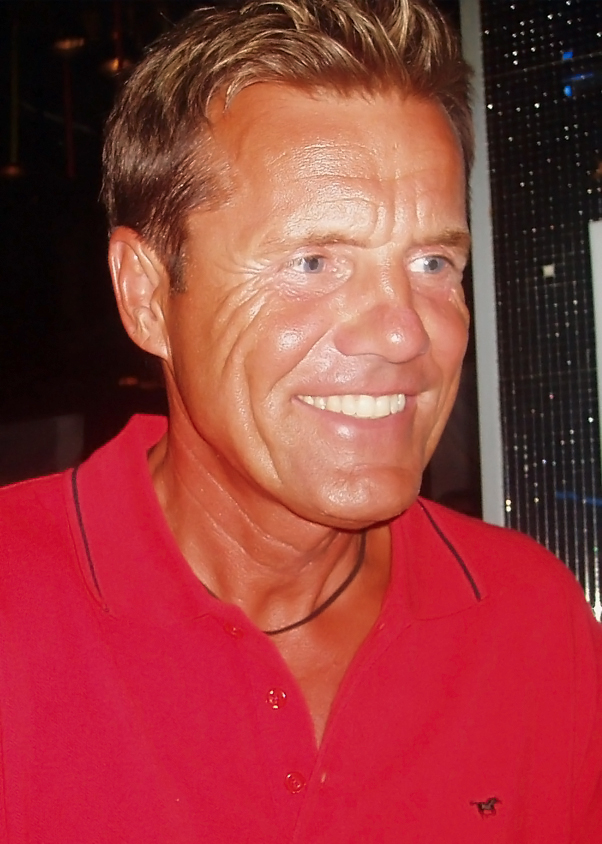
Dieter Bohlen

- Dieter Bohlen – lead vocals, guitar, keyboards (1987–1998)
- Frank Otto – drums (1987–1989)
- Joachim Vogel – rhythm guitar (1987–1990)
- Husnu Baylav (Snoopy) – drums (1989)
- Michel Rollin – drums (1989–1998)
- Joachim Strieben – keyboards (1989–1998)
- Lutz Krüger – vocals (1990–1991)
- Wolfgang Fritsch – rhythm guitar (1990–1996)
- Fritz Graner – keyboards (1991–1998)
- Dirk Sauer – vocals (1992–1994)
- Thorsten Feller – vocals (1994–1996)
- Lars Illmer – vocals (1997–1998)

Timeline

== Discography ==
=== Studio albums ===
- 1987 Walking on a Rainbow (Hansa Records)
- 1988 Body Heat (Hansa Records) [No. 23 Austria, No. 20 Germany]
- 1989 Twilight [No. 30 Austria, No. 26 Switzerland, No. 11 Germany]
- 1990 Obsession [No. 18 Austria, No. 14 Germany]
- 1991 Seeds of Heaven [No. 12 Austria, No. 11 Germany]
- 1991 Déjà vu [No. 18 Germany, No. 27 Austria]
- 1992 Hello America [No. 29 Germany, No. 21 Austria]
- 1993 Backstreet Dreams [No. 5 Germany, No. 22 Austria]
- 1994 21st Century [No. 11 Germany]
- 1994 X – Ten [No. 24 Germany]
- 1995 Forever Blue [No. 18 Germany]
- 1996 Body to Body [No. 29 Germany]
- 1997 Here I Am [No. 38 Germany]

=== Singles ===
Title	Year	Peak chart positions				Album
Title	Year	GER	AUT	SPA	SWI	Album
"Sorry, Little Sarah"	1987	14	10	6	—	Walking on a Rainbow
"Big Boys Don't Cry" (Denmark only)	1988	—	—	—	—	Walking on a Rainbow
"She's a Lady" (Spain only)	1988	—	—	14	—	Walking on a Rainbow
"My Bed Is Too Big"	1988	10	4	—	—	Body Heat
"Under My Skin"	1988	6	12	—	18	Body Heat
"Silent Water"	1989	13	16	—	—	Body Heat
"Love Suite" (remix '89)	1989	14	—	—	—	Body Heat
"Magic Symphony"	1989	10	23	—	21	Twilight
"Love Me on the Rocks"	1989	—	—	—	—	Twilight
"48 Hours"	1990	29	28	—	—	Obsession
"Love Is Such a Lonely Sword"	1990	16	13	—	—	Obsession
"When Sarah Smiles"	1990	63	—	—	—	Obsession
"Lucifer"	1991	25	8	—	—	Seeds of Heaven
"Testamente d'Amelia"	1991	34	—	—	—	Seeds of Heaven
"Déjà vu"	1991	12	16	—	—	Déjà vu
"It's All Over" (with Dionne Warwick)	1991	60	—	—	—	Déjà vu
"Romeo and Juliet"	1992	25	22	—	—	Hello America
"I Will Survive"	1992	—	30	—	—	Hello America
"History"	1993	26	—	—	—	Backstreet Dreams
"Operator"	1993	87	—	—	—	Backstreet Dreams
"6 Years – 6 Nights"	1994	47	—	—	—	21st Century
"That's Love"	1994	—	—	—	—	21st Century
"Dr. Mabuse"	1994	—	—	—	—	X–Ten
"Laila"	1995	29	—	—	—	Forever Blue
"Only with You"	1996	58	—	—	—	Body to Body
"For the Children"	1996	67	—	—	—	Body to Body
"Body to Body"	1996	—	—	—	—	Body to Body
"Anything"	1997	79	—	—	—	Here I Am
"Love Will Drive Me Crazy"	1998	—	—	—	—	Here I Am
"—" denotes a recording that did not chart or was not released in that territory.

== See also ==
- Modern Talking
- Euro disco
- Systems in Blue
