= X – Ten =

X-Ten

Studio album by Blue System
- Released: 31 October 1994
- Recorded: 1994
- Genre: Europop, Eurodance
- Length: 37:16
- Label: BMG
- Producer: Dieter Bohlen

Blue System chronology
21st Century (1994)	X-Ten (1994)	Forever Blue (1995)

Professional ratings
Review scores
Source	Rating
AllMusic	3.5/5 stars

X-Ten is the tenth album of Blue System. It was published in 1994 by BMG Ariola and produced by Dieter Bohlen. The album contains 11 tracks.

== Track listing ==
All tracks are written by Dieter Bohlen

#	Title	Length
1.	"Dr. Mabuse"	4:27
2.	"If There Is a God in Heaven"	3:13
3.	"How Will I Know"	3:41
4.	"Good Night Marielin"	4:48
5.	"Don't Knock Me Out"	3:13
6.	"You'll Be My Hero"	4:00
7.	"Does Your Mother Really Know"	3:57
8.	"When You Are Lonely"	4:20
9.	"The Earth Will Move"	3:43
10.	"Don't Stop to Dance"	4:09
11.	"Crying Game"	3:15

== Charts ==
Chart (1994)	Peak position
German Albums (GfK)	24
