= Michael Scholz =

German singer

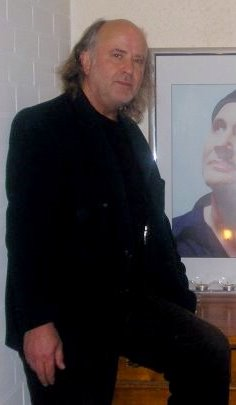

Background information
- Born: 26 January 1949 (age 77)
- Genres: Pop, rock
- Occupations: Singer, songwriter, record producer
- Labels: BMG, Spectre
- Website: systems-in-blue.de

Michael Scholz (26 January 1949) is a German singer, composer, and producer. He was part of the choir of Rolf Köhler.

Between 1984 and 2000, he collaborated with Dieter Bohlen for which he sang in the Modern Talking and Blue System choruses. Since 2003, he works on his music group, Systems in Blue.

His voice type is falsetto.

== See also ==
- Rolf Köhler
- Detlef Wiedeke
