= Detlef Wiedeke =

German singer

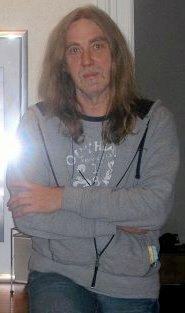

Background information
- Born: 5 July 1950 (age 76)
- Genres: Pop, rock
- Occupations: Singer, songwriter, record producer
- Years active: 1960s–present
- Labels: BMG, Spectre
- Member of: Systems in Blue
- Website: vintage-music.de

Detlef Wiedeke (born 5 July 1950) is a German singer, songwriter, and record producer.

Between 1984 and 2000, Wiedeke collaborated with Dieter Bohlen for which he sang in the Modern Talking and Blue System choruses. Since 2003, he has worked on his music group Systems in Blue.

His voice type is bass, falsetto.

== See also ==
- Rolf Köhler
- Michael Scholz
