= Rolf Köhler =

German musician (1951–2007)

- Born: 24 May 1951; Hamburg, West Germany
- Died: 16 September 2007 (aged 56) Hamburg-Altona, Germany
- Genres: Heavy metal, hard rock, pop rock
- Occupations: Singer, producer
- Years active: 1974–2007
- Formerly of: Modern Talking; Blue System; Systems in Blue
- Website: systems-in-blue.de

Rolf Köhler (24 May 1951 – 16 September 2007) was a German singer and record producer.

== Career ==
Köhler initially achieved commercial success performing under the pseudonym Marc de Ville in the late 1970s. As Marc de Ville, he recorded a few singles, including "Annie (I Don't Wanna Talk About the Weather)", "Walking Alone in the Rain" and "California". Köhler performed with a diverse range of musicians, including Marius Müller-Westernhagen and heavy metal band Saxon. He also wrote a number of German songs, including "Wenns um Geld geht", "Tortella" and "BIFI". Köhler was part of the Modern Talking choir that used a falsetto style.

Köhler co-owned Karo Music Studios and produced music together with other producers including Kalle Trapp, Blind Guardian, Molly Hatchet, New Commix, Kentucky, Toll House, Ser, Ian Cussick band, BLUE BLIZZ, Wave (with Wiedeke), and Gnadenlos Platt. In the mid-1980s, he co-produced a few singles in synth-pop-style productions with artists like Stag, L'Affair, C. Dorian, and Tom Jackson. Several of Köhler's synth-pop productions, including Solid Strangers, Boo Who, Straight Flush and Broken Dreams, were influenced by Hannes Schöner, who later formed Fair Control, and producer Peter Columbus.

Köhler died on 16 September 2007 from an apoplectic attack, aged 56.

=== Collaboration with Dieter Bohlen ===
In late 1984, Köhler was contracted as a studio session musician for the Modern Talking project to be part of the falsetto chorus. He collaborated with Dieter Bohlen for nearly 16 years. During this time, he also composed some heavy metal and hard rock albums without any success. After the dissolution of Modern Talking, Köhler joined the Blue System project created by Dieter Bohlen and Luis Rodriguez. Blue System had an international success releasing several albums during 1987 to 1997, where Köhler can be heard singing for most tracks in both the refrains and choruses. In 2003, Köhler joined Systems in Blue.

=== Systems in Blue ===
In 2003, Köhler, together with Michael Scholz, Detlef Wiedeke and producer Thomas Wildrat, formed the europop/synth-pop group Systems in Blue, which evolved from Blue System and Modern Talking. Systems in Blue has released four albums as of January 2013.

In 2008, Systems in Blue released the album Out of the Blue. Many critics noted that the musical construction and lyrics of the album were more mature and independent than the group's previous album, Point of No Return. Systems in Blue had a small gig in Russia, Germany and Israel.
