= Im Augenblick =

Studio album by Sarah Lombardi
- Released: 23 April 2021
- Length: 36:32
- Label: Ariola
- Producer: Marius Groeh; Philippe Heithier; Florian Jahrstorfer; Ole Köber; Nikolay Mohr; Phil da Beat; Innocent Ray; Truva; Kevin Zaremba; Stefan Zepp

Sarah Lombardi chronology
Zurück zu mir (2018)	Im Augenblick (2021)	Strong Girls Club (2025)

Im Augenblick (transl. At the Moment) is the third studio album by German singer Sarah Lombardi. It was released through Ariola Records on 23 April 2021 in German-speaking Europe.

== Promotion ==
Ariola Records released "Te Amo Mi Amor" as the album's lead single on 15 May 2020. The latin pop song represented Italy at the Free European Song Contest, a ProSieben-produced alternative for the Eurovision Song Contest 2020, which had originally been scheduled to take place in Rotterdam, Netherlands, but ultimately cancelled due to the COVID-19 pandemic. On 16 May 2020, it finished 13th (out of 16) in the final voting, having earned a total of 37 points. Commercially, it reached number 11 on the German Singles Chart and number 24 on the Austrian Singles Chart, becoming Lombardi's highest-charting single since 2011's "I Miss You."

== Critical reception ==
Professional ratings
Review scores
Source	Rating
Kronen Zeitung	6/10
laut.de	2/5 stars
mix1.de	7/8

laut.de editor Philipp Kause found that Im Augenblick was clinging to worn-out dance-pop formulas and simplistic slogans like "only love counts," casting doubt on its claim to be a "very personal album," especially given its reliance on a recycled Haddaway hit. He acknowledged that tracks such as "Te Amo Mi Amor," "Verliebt," and "Zoom" delivered catchy, radio-ready energy and occasional fresh genre touches. Nevertheless, he argued that persistent vocal flaws with metallic high notes, strained vowels, and overdramatic phrasing ultimately undermined an otherwise solid, if conventional, pop record. Kronen Zeitung critic Robert Fröwein observed that Lombardi built the album on a schlager foundation, while allowing contemporary pop elements to dominate its overall sound. He noted that whereas others singer such as Vanessa Mai often leans toward disco influences, Sarah felt more comfortable exploring the ballad-driven side of Im Augenblick. In his view, the album offered ideal material for its target audience, although the Haddaway-inspired track "Love Is Love" seemed somewhat excessive.

== Commercial performance ==
Im Augenblick opened and peaked at number eight on the German Albums Chart. It marked Lombardi's first album since 2011's Heartbeat to reach the top ten and remained on the chart for four weeks. In Austria, the album reached number 16 on the Austrian Albums Chart, also marking her highest-charting project there since her debut. In Switzerland, Im Augenblick peaked at number 24 on the Swiss Albums Chart before dropping off in its second week, making it her lowest-charting solo release to date.

== Track listing ==
Im Augenblick track listing
No.	Title	Writer(s)	Producer(s)	Length
1.	"Te Amo Mi Amor"	Philippe Heithier	Heithier; Innocent Ray	3:05
2.	"Flügel in Gedanken"	Cassandra Steen; Rainer Rütsch; Jonas Kleist	Truva	2:56
3.	"Love Is Love"	Dee Dee Halligan; Junior Torello; Elżbieta Steinmetz; Sebastian Rätzel; Sarah Lombardi; Nikolay Mohr	Mohr	2:50
4.	"Bailando con Fuego"	Heithier; Stefan Zepp	Heithier; Zepp	3:04
5.	"Ich"	Heithier	Heithier; Innocent Ray	3:13
6.	"Verliebt"	Claudio Pagonis; Heithier; Jan Philipp Bednorz	Heithier; Phil da Beat	2:29
7.	"Roter Faden"	Timothy Auld; Steinmetz; Steven Bashir; Benedikt Schöller	Truva	2:39
8.	"Im freien Fall nach oben"	Heiko Fischer; Henning Sommer	Kevin Zaremba; Florian Jahrstorfer	3:14
9.	"Zoom"	Heithier	Heithier; Innocent Ray	2:32
10.	"Alles auf rot"	Elif Demirezer; Tom Olbrich; Robert Redweik	Innocent Ray	2:57
11.	"Einen Anruf entfernt"	Steinmetz; Marius Groeh; Jerome Klusacek	Marius Groeh; Ole Köber	3:42
12.	"Ich" (Akustik Version)	Heithier	Heithier; Innocent Ray	3:14
Total length:				36:32

== Charts ==
Chart performance for Im Augenblick
Chart (2021)	Peak position
Austrian Albums (Ö3 Austria)	16
German Albums (Offizielle Top 100)	8
Swiss Albums (Schweizer Hitparade)	24

== Release history ==
Im Augenblick release history
Region	Date	Format(s)	Label	Ref.
Various	23 April 2021	CD; digital download; streaming	Ariola	
