= Heartbeat (Sarah Engels album) =

Studio album by Sarah Engels
- Released: 24 June 2011
- Length: 46:10
- Label: Universal
- Producer: Dieter Bohlen

Sarah Engels chronology
Heartbeat (2011)	Dream Team (2013)

Singles from Heartbeat
- 1. "Call My Name" Released: 7 May 2011; 2. "I Miss You" Released: 17 June 2011; 3. "Only for You" Released: 2 September 2011

Heartbeat is the debut album by German singer Sarah Lombardi. It was released on 24 June 2011 through Universal Music Group, following her participation in the eighth season of Deutschland sucht den Superstar. Chiefly produced by DSDS judge Dieter Bohlen, it reached number two on the German Albums Chart. The first single released from the album "Call My Name" was released on 7 May 2011, while the following second single "I Miss You" was issued on 17 June.

== Promotion ==
"Call My Name," the winning song from the eighth season of Deutschland sucht den Superstar, was released as the album's lead single on 7 May 2011. Also recorded and released by Pietro Lombardi, the track became a major commercial success, peaking at number two in Germany, Austria, and Switzerland, ranking just behind Lombardi's recording in each of those charts.

The second single, "I Miss You," a duet with Lombardi, followed on 17 June 2011 and was notable for being the first song created specifically for Sarah Engels. It also performed strongly on the charts, reaching number two in Germany, number six in Austria, and number fourteen in Switzerland. "Only for You" was released as the album’s third single on 2 September 2011 and achieved more moderate chart success, peaking at number 33 in Germany and number 47 in Austria. In addition, "Love of My Life" was issued as a promotional single.

== Critical reception ==
Professional ratings
Review scores
Source	Rating
laut.de	1/5 stars

Dani Fromm of laut.de rated the album one star out of five and described Heartbeat as a cynical and exploitative DSDS product that wastes Engels' vocal talent beneath formulaic Dieter Bohlen productions. She condemned the album as a "truly disgusting disregard for talent" and argues that Engels' abilities make the record "even more cruel" than Pietro Lombardi's debut. While praising her vocal power on several cover versions, Fromm criticized the "thoughtless and emotionless music" and clichéd lyrics, concluding that the album represents "a new low" in the show's treatment of a gifted young singer.

== Commercial performance ==
Heartbeat achieved solid commercial success in German-speaking Europe. The album debuted at number two on the German Albums Chart, opening behind Gold Cobra, the fifth studio album by American nu metal band Limp Bizkit, while reaching number five in Austria and number 13 in Switzerland. It also appeared on the German year-end albums chart at number 95.

== Track listing ==
Heartbeat track listing
No.	Title	Writer(s)	Length
1.	"I Miss You" (with Pietro Lombardi)	Dieter Bohlen	3:31
2.	"Can't Stop"	Bohlen	4:06
3.	"Heartbeat"	Bohlen	3:20
4.	"Run"	Gary Lightbody; Jonathan Quinn; Mark McClelland; Nathan Connolly; Iain Archer	3:46
5.	"Love of My Life"	Bohlen	3:06
6.	"Call My Name"	Bohlen	3:43
7.	"Tonight"	Bohlen	3:25
8.	"If..."	Bohlen	3:22
9.	"One Day in Your Life"	Anastacia Newkirk; Louis Biancaniello; Sam Watters	3:46
10.	"Hearts of Fire"	Bohlen	3:17
11.	"Only for You"	Bohlen	3:15
12.	"I'm So Excited"	Anita Pointer; June Pointer; Ruth Pointer; Trevor Lawrence	3:42
13.	"Hurt"	Christina Aguilera; Linda Perry; Mark Ronson	4:01
Total length:			46:10

Saturn bonus tracks
No.	Title	Writer(s)	Length
14.	"How Will I Know"	George Merrill; Shannon Rubicam; Narada Michael Walden	3:59
15.	"If..." (Piano Remix)	Bohlen	3:22
16.	"Heartbeat" (Remix)	Bohlen	3:11

== Charts ==
=== Weekly charts ===
Weekly chart performance for Heartbeat
Chart (2011)	Peak position
Austrian Albums (Ö3 Austria)	5
German Albums (Offizielle Top 100)	2
Swiss Albums (Schweizer Hitparade)	13

=== Year-end charts ===
Year-end chart performance for Heartbeat
Chart (2011)	Position
German Albums (Offizielle Top 100)	95
