= Only for You =

Only for You may refer to:

- Only for You (film), a 2007 romance film
- Only for You (Sofia Rotaru album) (1979)
- Only for You (Show Lo album) (2011)
- "Only for You" (song), a song by Sarah Engels from Heartbeat
- Onlyforyou (horse), a racehorse
