= It's Christmas Time (Sarah Engels song) =

"It’s Christmas Time"

Single by Pietro Lombardi & Sarah Engels
- Released: December 2, 2011
- Recorded: 2011
- Genre: Pop
- Length: 2:58
- Label: Universal Music Germany
- Songwriter(s): Dieter Bohlen
- Producer(s): Dieter Bohlen

Pietro Lombardi singles chronology
"Goin' to L.A." (2011)	"It’s Christmas Time" (2011)

Sarah Engels singles chronology
"Only for You" (2011)	"It’s Christmas Time" (2011)

"It’s Christmas Time" is a song recorded by Sarah Engels. It features vocals from Pietro Lombardi. It was written and produced by DSDS jury member Dieter Bohlen. The song was released on December 2, 2011 in Germany.

== Track listing ==
Digital download

1. "It's Christmas Time" - 2:58

== Chart performance ==
Chart (2011)	Peak position
Austria (Ö3 Austria Top 40)	75

== Release history ==
Region	Date	Format	Label
Germany	2 December 2011	Digital download	Universal Music Germany
