= Dream Team (album) =

Studio album by Sarah & Pietro
- Released: 22 March 2013
- Label: Polydor
- Producer: Mathias Ramson; Brix

Pietro Lombardi chronology
Pietro Style (2011)	Dream Team (2013)	Teil von mir (2016)

Sarah Lombardi chronology
Heartbeat (2011)	Dream Team (2013)	Teil von mir (2016)

Dream Team is the second studio album by German singers Sarah and Pietro Lombardi. Their first collaborative effort, it was released by Polydor Records on 22 March 2013 in German-speaking Europe.

== Track listing ==
No.	Title	Writer(s)	Length
1.	"Dream Team"	John Ryan; Tiffany Vartanyan	3:39
2.	"Intimacy"	Billy Steinberg; Neil Giraldo; Rick Nowels	4:02
3.	"This Is It"	Lindy Robbins; Marcello Pagin; Christian F.J. Büttner; Eric Bellinger	3:40
4.	"Slow Lightning"	Martin Brammer; Adam Argyle; Iain James	3:23
5.	"Hanging On"	Ben Earle; Dave Munday; Twinnie-Lee Moore	3:28
6.	"Made That Way"	Kloos; Justin Wildenhain; Jan Grasmück	3:37
7.	"Killah"	Albert Kissmann; Chris Kleiner; Marvin Kucklack	3:23
8.	"Turn Up the Night"	Mark Frisch; Anthony Galatis; Tobias Gustavsson	3:12
9.	"Keep On Loving You"	Engelina Andrina Larsen; Fridolin Nordsø; Frederik Tao Nordsø; Thomas Volmer Schulz	4:28
10.	"Bigger Than Love"	Charles Nystroem; Bastian Krauth; James Supasonic	3:31
11.	"Yesterday"	Albert Kissmann; Chris Kleiner; Giovanna Winterfeld	4:22
12.	"Airbus"	John Gordon; Lene Dissing; Peter Bjørnskov	3:01
13.	"Chilling in Paradise"	Mark Cyrus; Simon Wilcox; Jaden Michaels	3:49

== Charts ==
Chart (2013)	Peak position
Austrian Albums (Ö3 Austria)	37
German Albums (Offizielle Top 100)	34
Swiss Albums (Schweizer Hitparade)	69
