= Te Amo Mi Amor =

Single by Sarah Lombardi

from the album Im Augenblick
- Released: 15 May 2020
- Genre: Latin pop
- Length: 3:04
- Label: Ariola
- Songwriter: Philippe Heithier
- Producers: Heithier; Innocent Ray

Sarah Lombardi singles chronology
"Ich liebe nur dich" (2019)	"Te Amo Mi Amor" (2020)	"Zoom" (2020)

"Te Amo Mi Amor" (English: I Love You My Love) is a song by German singer Sarah Lombardi. Written by Philippe Heithier and produced by Heithier and Innocent Ray, it was released on 15 May 2020 by Ariola Records as the lead single from Lombardi's fifth studio album Im Augenblick (2021). "Te Amo Mi Amor" served as Italy's entry for the Free European Song Contest 2020. On 16 May 2020, it finished 13th (out of 16) in the final voting, having earned a total of 37 points. On the charts, it reached number 11 on the German Singles Chart.

== Music video ==
A lyric video for "Te Amo Mi Amor" premiered online on 16 May 2020, depicting different island-flavored motives. On 20 May 2020, a music video directed by Marvin Ströter and produced Stefanie Ganschow, was released on Lombardi's YouTube account. It features appearances from her Let's Dance dancing partner Robert Beitsch as well as her Dancing on Ice skating partner Joti Polizoakis.

== Track listing ==
- Digital download
1. "Te Amo Mi Amor" – 3:04

== Charts ==
Chart (2020)	Peak position
Austria (Ö3 Austria Top 40)	24
Germany (GfK)	11
Switzerland (Schweizer Hitparade)	42
