= Teil von mir =

Studio album by Sarah & Pietro
- Released: 18 May 2016
- Label: Kick Media
- Producer: Hermann Niesig

Pietro Lombardi chronology
Dream Team (2013)	Teil von mir (2016)	Lombardi (2020)

Sarah Lombardi chronology
Dream Team (2013)	Teil von mir (2016)	Zurück zu mir (2018)

Teil von mir (transl. Part of Me) is the third studio album by German singers Sarah and Pietro Lombardi. It was released by Kick Media Music on 18 May 2016 in German-speaking Europe.

== Track listing ==
No.	Title	Writer(s)	Length
1.	"Teil von mir"	Tamara Olorga; Jonas Knopf	3:11
2.	"Mondsüchtig"	Julia Kautz; Bastian Krauth; Charles Nyström	3:18
3.	"Helden"	Fabian Strangl; Kautz	3:12
4.	"Unsere Reise"	Leonard Prasuhn; Björn Steiner; Ela Steinmetz	3:19
5.	"Nur mit dir"	Hermann Niesig; Laura Kloos	3:54
6.	"Blackout"	Kloos; Justin Wildenhain; Jan Grasmück	3:43
7.	"In meinem Ozean"	Daniel Volpe; Olorga	3:09
8.	"Okay"	Lea-Marie Becker	3:28
9.	"Perfekt"	Kautz; Thomas Eifert; Sebastian Harbauer	3:29
10.	"Leicht"	Bernie Penzias; Olorga	3:44
11.	"Nimm meine Hand" (featuring Benjamin Kleinholz)	Matthew Tasa; Kautz; Wincent Weiss; Sascha Wernicke	3:09
12.	"Nimmerland"	Olorga; Arina Kriegenburg	3:19
13.	"Bleib"	Tobias Reitz; Becker; Johannes "Jo" Hofmann	3:36

== Charts ==
Chart (2016)	Peak position
Austrian Albums (Ö3 Austria)	27
German Albums (Offizielle Top 100)	35
Swiss Albums (Schweizer Hitparade)	35
