= Jackpot (Pietro Lombardi album) =

Studio album by Pietro Lombardi
- Released: 27 May 2011
- Length: 41:48
- Label: Warner Music Germany
- Producer: Dieter Bohlen

Pietro Lombardi chronology
| Jackpot (2011) | Pietro Style (2011) |

Singles from Jackpot
- 1. "Call My Name" Released: 7 May 2011

Jackpot is the debut studio album by German singer Pietro Lombardi, the winner of the eighth season of Deutschland sucht den Superstar, the German version of the Idol franchise. Produced by DSDS jury member Dieter Bohlen, it was released by Warner Music Germany on 27 May 2011 in German-speaking Europe and debuted at number one in Germany and Austria and number three in Switzerland, reaching Gold status in Switzerland and Platinum status in both Austria and Germany.

== Promotion ==
The album's first and only album, "Call My Name", Lombardi's coronation song on the eighth season of Deutschland sucht den Superstar, was released on 7 May 2011. Selling 125,000 copies within its first 26 hours of release, the song reached number one in Austria, Germany, and Switzerland, and was certified Platinum in Austria and Germany as well as Gold in Switzerland.

== Critical reception ==
Professional ratings
Review scores
| Source | Rating |
|---|---|
| laut.de | 1/5 stars |

Dani Fromm from laut.de gave the album a highly negative review, criticizing it as "uninspired, cheap and careless" and accusing it of being a purely commercial product designed to exploit Lombardi's temporary popularity after Deutschland sucht den Superstar. She particularly condemned the "formulaic Eurodance production," simplistic lyrics, and Lombardi's limited vocal abilities, arguing that neither the music nor the production showed any artistic ambition or originality. Similarly, MSN critic Christina Zimmermann criticizes Lombardi's pronunciation and his occasionally breaking voice, also pointing out noticeable similarities to older songs in several tracks. In her review, she characterizes the album as a "target audience–oriented DSDS album."

== Commercial performance ==
Jackpot debuted at number one on the German and Austrian Albums Chart and reached number three on the Swiss Albums Chart. The album also appeared on the year-end charts in all three countries, peaking at number 13 in Austria, number 19 in Germany, and number 42 in Switzerland. In Switzerland, the album was certified Gold by the Swiss arm of the International Federation of the Phonographic Industry (IFPI) for shipments of over 15,000 units. It was also certified Platinum in Austria for 20,000 units and Platinum by the Bundesverband Musikindustrie (BVMI) for 200,000 units.

== Track listing ==
All tracks produced by Dieter Bohlen; co-produced by Joachim "Jeo" Mezei.

Standard edition
| No. | Title | Writer(s) | Length |
|---|---|---|---|
| 1. | "Call My Name" | Dieter Bohlen | 3:42 |
| 2. | "Que Sera Sera" | Jay Livingston; Ray Evans | 3:54 |
| 3. | "I Need You" (duet with Sarah Engels) | Bohlen | 3:07 |
| 4. | "Down" | Jay Sean; Jared Lincoln Cotter; Jeremy D. Skaller; Robert W. Larow; Dwayne Carter, Jr. | 3:20 |
| 5. | "Holiday" | Bohlen | 3:12 |
| 6. | "Don't Worry, Be Happy" | Bobby McFerrin | 4:01 |
| 7. | "Mad World" | Roland Orzabal | 3:13 |
| 8. | "What About Us" | Bohlen | 3:16 |
| 9. | "Can You Feel the Love Tonight" | Elton John; Tim Rice | 4:01 |
| 10. | "Crazy Like Me" | Bohlen | 3:00 |
| 11. | "Don't Cry These Tears" | Bohlen | 3:53 |
| 12. | "Wenn das Liebe ist" | Moses Pelham; Martin Haas | 3:04 |
| Total length: | | | 41:48 |

Disc 2 (deluxe edition)
| No. | Title | Length |
|---|---|---|
| 13. | "Best of Pietro" | 6:01 |
| 14. | "Making of Photoshoot" | 4:01 |
| 15. | "Making of Video" | 4:58 |
| 16. | "Call My Name" | 3:43 |
| 17. | "Slideshow" | 1:46 |

== Charts ==
=== Weekly charts ===
Weekly chart performance for Jackpot
| Chart (2011) | Peak position |
|---|---|
| Austrian Albums (Ö3 Austria) | 1 |
| German Albums (Offizielle Top 100) | 1 |
| Swiss Albums (Schweizer Hitparade) | 3 |

=== Year-end charts ===
Year-end chart performance for Jackpot
| Chart (2011) | Position |
|---|---|
| Austrian Albums (Ö3 Austria) | 13 |
| German Albums (Offizielle Top 100) | 19 |
| Swiss Albums (Schweizer Hitparade) | 42 |

== Certifications ==
Certifications for Jackpot
| Region | Certification | Certified units/sales |
|---|---|---|
| Austria (IFPI Austria) | Platinum | 20,000^{*} |
| Germany (BVMI) | Platinum | 200,000^{^} |
| Switzerland (IFPI Switzerland) | Gold | 15,000^{^} |
^{*} Sales figures based on certification alone.^{^} Shipments figures based on certification alone.

== Release history ==
Jackpot release history
| Region | Date | Format | Label | Ref(s) |
|---|---|---|---|---|
| Germany | 27 May 2011 | Digital download; CD | Universal Music Germany | |
