= Zurück zu mir =

Studio album by Sarah Lombardi
- Released: 4 May 2018
- Length: 39:58
- Label: El Cartel; Universal

Sarah Lombardi chronology
| Teil von mir (2016) | Zurück zu mir (2018) | Im Augenblick (2021) |

Zurück zu mir (transl. Back to Me) is the second studio album by German singer Sarah Lombardi. It was released through El Cartel Music and Universal Music on 4 May 2018 in German-speaking Europe.

== Track listing ==
| No. | Title | Writer(s) | Length |
|---|---|---|---|
| 1. | "Genau hier" | Florian Cojocaru; Elżbieta Steinmetz | 3:16 |
| 2. | "Mein Leben" | Nils Brunkhorst; Hermann Niesig; Laura Kloos; Michele Bircher | 2:48 |
| 3. | "Drifte davon" | Lea-Marie Becker; Johannes "Jo" Hofmann | 3:27 |
| 4. | "Einzigartig schön" | Daniel Volpe; Kloos; Tamara Olorga; Grace Capristo | 2:56 |
| 5. | "Soleil" | Olorga; Benedikt Janny; Simon Kenntner | 3:05 |
| 6. | "Mensch ärger dich nicht" | Olorga; Paul Jacobi; Matthias Heising | 3:18 |
| 7. | "Labyrinth" | Niesig; Kloos; Arlis Albritton; Charlie Oxford | 3:33 |
| 8. | "Zweifel" | Christoph Cronauer; Vito Kovach; Kloos | 3:10 |
| 9. | "Durch die schweren Zeiten" | Udo Lindenberg; Alexander Zuckowski; Simon Triebel | 3:34 |
| 10. | "Miss You Love" | Niesig; Billy Austin; Dillon Dixon; Kloos; Sarah Lombardi | 3:09 |
| 11. | "Hinterher" | Arne Gedigk; Tim Schwerdter; Olorga | 3:19 |
| 12. | "Feuer" | David Kirchner; Niesig; Kloos; Anders Wigelius | 2:59 |

== Charts ==
| Chart (2018) | Peak position |
|---|---|
| Austrian Albums (Ö3 Austria) | 18 |
| German Albums (Offizielle Top 100) | 18 |
| Swiss Albums (Schweizer Hitparade) | 21 |

== Release history ==
| Region | Date | Format(s) | Label | Ref. |
|---|---|---|---|---|
| Various | 4 May 2018 | CD; digital download; streaming | El Cartel; Universal | |
