= Strong Girls Club =

Studio album by Sarah Engels
- Released: 22 August 2025
- Length: 54:45
- Label: Ariola

Sarah Engels chronology
Im Augenblick (2021)	Strong Girls Club (2025)

Strong Girls Club is the fourth studio album by German singer Sarah Engels. It was released through Ariola Records on 22 August 2025 in German-speaking Europe.

== Critical reception ==
Professional ratings
Review scores
Source	Rating
laut.de	2/5 stars
mix1.de	7/8

laut.de editor Elias Raatz observed that Strong Girls Club was ambitious in concept but ultimately fell short in execution, delivering overproduced, interchangeable pop with little personal identity. He noted that while tracks like the title song and her duet with Beatrice Egli offered moments of empowerment and solid musicality, the album's ballads exposed Engels’ vocal limitations and lacked emotional depth. Overall, Raatz described the album as "musical speed-dating without a match." mix1.de concluded: "Anyone looking for honest lyrics, strong melodies, and a soundtrack for all of life’s moments should not miss Strong Girls Club."

== Commercial performance ==
Strong Girls Club debuted and peaked at number 53 on the German Albums Chart before dropping off in its second week, making it Engels' lowest-performing album to date. In Austria, the album reached number 74 on the Austrian Albums Chart, becoming her highest-charting project there since her debut.

== Track listing ==
Strong Girls Club track listing – disc 1
No.	Title	Writer(s)	Producer(s)	Length
1.	"Keep You Safe"	Leonie Burger; Mark Becker; Vitali Zestovskih; Milo Hoelz	Ossia	2:15
2.	"Boots"	Aaron Pfeiffer; Burger; Becker; Zestovskih		2:12
3.	"Gimme! Gimme! Gimme!" (with Crystal Rock)	Benny Andersson; Björn Ulvaeus	Ossia	2:25
4.	"Hurricane"	Violet Skies; Ferras Alqaisi; Phinisey; Jaro Omar	Phinisey	3:30
5.	"Don't Let Me Go"	Burger; Becker; Zestovskih	Ossia	2:12
6.	"Austin"	Adam Wendler; Anna Dasha Novotny; Cheyenne Rose Arnspiger; Kenneth Travis Heidelman	Stephan Zepp	2:52
7.	"Travel the World" (with Ty Darling)	Raphael Lott; Merijn Mooijman	Lott; Ossia	2:39
8.	"Now I Know"	Lott; James French	Lott	1:55
9.	"Broken Melody"	Burger; Zestovskih; Justin Jesso	Valentin Bos; Ossia	2:49
10.	"This Is How Love Should Feel"	Burger; Zestovskih; Marli Harwood; Giacomo Uber	Bos	2:16

Disc 2
No.	Title	Writer(s)	Producer(s)	Length
1.	"Starke Mädchen"	Elzbieta Steinmetz; David Gold; Martin Fliegenschmidt	Gold	3:20
2.	"Jemand" (with Joel Brandenstein)	Brandenstein; Tom Hengelbrock; Björn Steiner	Bjorn Olson	2:41
3.	"Für immer"	Nico Gomez; Cristobal Galvez Moreno; Chris Möhlenkamp	Gomez; Moreno; Möhlenkamp	2:50
4.	"Wie nie zuvor"	Christoph Cronauer; Dominik Lange; Lorena Wolf; Mathias Karrer; Matthias Zürkler	B-Case; 27th	3:10
5.	"Mit Dir"	Stefan Zepp; Johannes Lemken; Philippe Heithier	Heithier	2:45
6.	"Ich bleib"	Helge Preuss; Michel Noeh	Preuss	2:57
7.	"Para siempre (Für immer)"	Édgar Barrera; Manuel Turizo; Andres Jael Correa Rios; Luis Miguel Gómez Castaño; Juan Diego Medina Vélez	Kim Wennerström; Marius Gröh; Steinmetz	2:22
8.	"Verlier mich in dir"	Luisa Heinemann; Raphael Lott; Hannes Volz	Ossia; Lott	2:12
9.	"Ich hab von dir geträumt" (with Matthias Reim)	Reim; Bernd Dietrich	Johannes Lemken; Zepp; Zweifragezeichen	3:49
10.	"Starke Mädchen" (with Beatrice Egli)	Steinmetz; Gold; Fliegenschmidt	Gold	3:20
Total length:				54:45

== Charts ==
Chart performance for Strong Girls Club
Chart (2025)	Peak position
Austrian Albums (Ö3 Austria)	74
German Albums (Offizielle Top 100)	53

== Release history ==
Strong Girls Club release history
Region	Date	Format(s)	Label	Ref.
Various	22 August 2025	CD; digital download; streaming	Ariola	
