= Germany in the Eurovision Song Contest 2026 =

- Eurovision Song Contest 2026
- Participating broadcaster: ARD – Südwestrundfunk (SWR)
- Country: Germany
- Selection process: Eurovision Song Contest – Das deutsche Finale 2026
- Selection date: 28 February 2026

Competing entry
- Song: "Fire"
- Artist: Sarah Engels
- Songwriters: Dario Schürmann; Luisa Heinemann; Raphael Lott; Sarah Engels; Valentin Boes

Placement
- Final result: 23rd, 12 points

Participation chronology

Germany was represented at the Eurovision Song Contest 2026 with the song "Fire", written by Dario Schürmann, Luisa Heinemann, Raphael Lott, Sarah Engels and Valentin Boes, and performed by Engels herself. The German participating broadcaster on behalf of ARD, Südwestrundfunk (SWR), organised the national final format Eurovision Song Contest – Das deutsche Finale 2026 to select its entry for the contest.

As a member of the "Big Four", Germany automatically qualified to compete in the final of the Eurovision Song Contest.

== Background ==
Prior to the 2026 contest, ARD has participated in the Eurovision Song Contest representing Germany 68 times since its debut at the inaugural contest in 1956, making Germany, to this point, the country with the most entries in the contest; it has taken part in every edition, except in 1996, when it was eliminated in a pre-qualification round. It has won the contest on two occasions: in 1982 with the song "Ein bißchen Frieden" performed by Nicole, and in 2010 with the song "Satellite" performed by Lena. In 2025, "Baller" performed by Abor & Tynna placed 15th out of 26 competing songs in the final with 151 points.

As part of its duties as participating broadcaster, ARD organises the selection of its entry in the Eurovision Song Contest and broadcasts the event in the country. ARD confirmed its participation in the 2026 contest on 3 June 2025. For the first time, ARD has delegated the participation in the contest to its member Südwestrundfunk (SWR), starting in 2026. On 17 September 2025, SWR announced that it would organise a national final with several artists to choose both the song and performer to compete in the contest.

== Before Eurovision ==
=== Eurovision Song Contest – Das deutsche Finale 2026 ===
Eurovision Song Contest – Das deutsche Finale 2026 ("Eurovision Song Contest – The German Final 2026") was the competition that selected the German entry for the Eurovision Song Contest 2026. The competition took place on 28 February 2026 at the Studio Berlin in Adlershof, hosted by Barbara Schöneberger and Hazel Brugger, and consisted of a single show which was broadcast on Das Erste and One as well as online via the ARD Mediathek platform. The national final was watched by 3.651 million viewers in Germany with a market share of 18.1% – the highest since 2002.

==== Competing entries ====
Interested artists and composers were able to submit their entries for the competition between 15 September 2025 and 22 October 2025. Artists were required to be 18 years of age by 30 April 2026, be professional performers with an existing business environment as well as media experience, and have a connection to Germany (possess German citizenship, residency or ancestry, or be German-speaking). Additional proposals were received by SWR from record companies, music publishers, artist managers and international music industry representatives. The nine competing entries were selected over three stages. In the first stage, entries were selected for the second stage by members of the SWR editorial team. The second stage involved an international expert and audience panel shortlisting several entries for the third stage. In the third stage, the shortlisted artists further developed their songs in songwriting camps with international songwriters and producers, and a panel of music industry experts as well as the international panel selected the nine finalists. The nine participating acts were announced on 15 January 2026.

Artist	Song	Songwriter(s)
Bela	"Herz"	Béla Marton; Chris Cronauer; Jonas Mengler
Dreamboys the Band	"Jeanie"	Benedikt Schöller; Janine Villforth; Johanna Gußmagg; Nina Caroline Wegener; Philippa Kinsky; Timothy Auld
Laura Nahr	"Wonderland"	Laura Nahr; Ningyuan Jiang; Sam Harper; Samuel Dick
Malou Lovis	"When I'm with You"	Chelcee Grimes; Louis Schoorl; Malou Lovis Kreyelkamp
Molly Sue	"Optimist (Ha Ha Ha)"	Chris James; Molly Sue; Sam Harper
MYLE	"A OK"	Bovvary; Iain James; Milo Hoelz; Sacha Rudy
Ragazzki	"Ciao ragazzki"	David Starosciak; Marti Fischer
Sarah Engels	"Fire"	Dario Schürmann; Luisa Heinemann; Raphael Lott; Sarah Engels; Valentin Boes
Wavvyboi	"Black Glitter"	Cameron Louis Warren; Harlee Jayne Sudworth; Simon Vogt-Grande

==== Final ====
The final took place on 28 February 2026. The winner was selected through two rounds of voting. In the first round of voting, a 20-member international jury panel selected the top three entries to proceed to the second round; the jury's favourite was "Black Glitter" performed by Wavvyboi. In the second round, the winner, "Fire" performed by Sarah Engels, was selected solely through public voting. In addition to the performances of the competing entries, the show was opened by German 2025 entrants Abor and Tynna performing their entry "Baller", while former Eurovision entrants Ruslana (Ukraine 2004), Michael Schulte (Germany 2018), Luca Hänni (Switzerland 2019), Destiny (Malta 2021) and Carla (France Junior 2019) performed during the show. Four experts also provided feedback in regards to the songs during the show: comedian Carolin Kebekus, Swiss 1969 and 1980 entrant Paola Felix, actor Hans Sigl and Schulte.

Final – 28 February 2026
R/O	Artist	Song	Result
1	Bela	"Herz"	Eliminated
2	Dreamboys the Band	"Jeanie"	Eliminated
3	Myle	"A OK"	Eliminated
4	Ragazzki	"Ciao ragazzki"	Eliminated
5	Laura Nahr	"Wonderland"	Eliminated
6	Malou Lovis	"When I'm with You"	Eliminated
7	Wavvyboi	"Black Glitter"	Advanced
8	Sarah Engels	"Fire"	Advanced
9	Molly Sue	"Optimist (Ha Ha Ha)"	Advanced

Superfinal – 28 February 2026
R/O	Artist	Song	Televote	Place
1	Wavvyboi	"Black Glitter"	34.15%	2
2	Sarah Engels	"Fire"	38.30%	1
3	Molly Sue	"Optimist (Ha Ha Ha)"	27.55%	3

International jury members
Name	Country	Profession
William Lee Adams	United Kingdom	Founder of Wiwibloggs
Annabelle	Czechia	Singer-songwriter and rapper, finalist of ESCZ 2022
Margaret Berger	Norway	Singer, radio DJ, 2013 Norwegian entrant
Christer Björkman	Sweden	Television producer, 1992 Swedish entrant
Carla	France	Singer, presenter, 2019 French Junior Eurovision entrant
Wim Dehandschutter	Belgium	Journalist
Destiny	Malta	Singer, 2015 Junior Eurovision winner and 2021 Maltese Eurovision entrant
Christian Ellegaard	Denmark	Journalist
Gohar Gasparyan	Armenia	Presenter, editor
Luca Hänni	Switzerland	Singer, dancer, 2019 Swiss entrant
Anca Lupeș	Romania	Music journalist
Catherine Nothum	Luxembourg	Radio producer
Alex Panayi	Cyprus	Singer, vocal coach, music director, 1995 and 2000 Cypriot entrant
Diletta Parlangeli	Italy	Journalist, presenter
Ruslana	Ukraine	Singer, 2004 Eurovision winner
Sanni	Finland	Singer, presenter
Karl-Erik Taukar	Estonia	Singer, bassist, presenter
Thomas Thurner	Austria	Music producer, songwriter
Vaidotas Valiukevičius	Lithuania	Singer-songwriter, model, actor, 2021 Lithuanian entrant as part of The Roop
Roksana Węgiel	Poland	Singer, 2018 Junior Eurovision winner

== At Eurovision ==
The Eurovision Song Contest 2026 took place at the Wiener Stadthalle in Vienna, Austria, and consisted of two semi-finals held on the respective dates of 12 and 14 May and the final on 16 May 2026. All nations with the exceptions of the host country and the "Big Four" (France, Germany, Italy, and the United Kingdom) were required to qualify from one of two semi-finals in order to compete in the final; the top ten countries from each semi-final progressed to the final. As a member of the "Big Four", Germany automatically qualified to compete in the final on 16 May 2026, but was also required to broadcast and vote in one of the two semi-finals. This was decided via a draw held during the semi-final allocation draw on 12 January 2026, when it was announced that Germany would be voting in the second semi-final. Despite being an automatic qualifier for the final, the German entry was also performed during the semi-final.

=== Final ===
Germany's position to perform in the final was allocated via the producers' choice and performed 2nd, succeeding Denmark and preceding Israel.

=== Voting ===
==== Points awarded to Germany ====
Points awarded to Germany (Final)
Score	Televote	Jury
12 points		
10 points		
8 points		
7 points		
6 points		
5 points		
4 points		Italy; Portugal
3 points		
2 points		Belgium; Bulgaria
1 point		

==== Points awarded by Germany ====
Points awarded by Germany (Semi-final 1)
Score	Televote	Jury
12 points	Israel	Poland
10 points	Poland	Finland
8 points	Greece	Croatia
7 points	Moldova	Israel
6 points	Croatia	Sweden
5 points	Serbia	Greece
4 points	Finland	Montenegro
3 points	Lithuania	Lithuania
2 points	Portugal	Belgium
1 point	Estonia	Moldova

Points awarded by Germany (Final)
Score	Televote	Jury
12 points	Israel	Poland
10 points	Bulgaria	Italy
8 points	Greece	Finland
7 points	Croatia	Bulgaria
6 points	Italy	France
5 points	Austria	Australia
4 points	Poland	Denmark
3 points	Moldova	Israel
2 points	Ukraine	Croatia
1 point	Romania	Sweden

==== Detailed voting results ====
Each participating broadcaster assembles a seven-member jury panel consisting of music industry professionals who are citizens of the country they represent and two of which have to be between 18 and 25 years old. Each jury, and individual jury member, is required to meet a strict set of criteria regarding professional background, as well as diversity in gender and age. No member of a national jury was permitted to be related in any way to any of the competing acts in such a way that they cannot vote impartially and independently. The individual rankings of each jury member as well as the nation's televoting results were released shortly after the grand final.

The following members comprised the German jury:

- Bela Marton
- Jules Kalmbacher
- Len Clare
- Udo Dahmen
- Alina Stiegler
- Hayat Joy Berhanu
- Sophia Gruber

Detailed voting results from Germany (Semi-final 1)
R/O	Country	Jury									Televote	
R/O	Country	Juror A	Juror B	Juror C	Juror D	Juror E	Juror F	Juror G	Rank	Points	Rank	Points
01	Moldova	9	4	10	12	7	6	15	10	1	4	7
02	Sweden	8	10	3	2	5	5	10	5	6	14	
03	Croatia	4	11	9	1	3	1	13	3	8	5	6
04	Greece	2	5	2	14	15	4	9	6	5	3	8
05	Portugal	15	6	15	8	13	15	8	14		9	2
06	Georgia	10	9	14	15	10	13	14	15		15	
07	Finland	12	2	1	5	2	2	6	2	10	7	4
08	Montenegro	3	13	11	13	4	12	3	7	4	12	
09	Estonia	14	7	13	10	8	14	7	13		10	1
10	Israel	5	1	5	6	6	3	11	4	7	1	12
11	Belgium	6	8	7	9	9	9	5	9	2	11	
12	Lithuania	7	14	6	3	12	10	4	8	3	8	3
13	San Marino	11	12	8	11	14	11	2	11		13	
14	Poland	1	3	4	7	1	7	1	1	12	2	10
15	Serbia	13	15	12	4	11	8	12	12		6	5

Detailed voting results from Germany (Final)
R/O	Country	Jury									Televote	
R/O	Country	Juror A	Juror B	Juror C	Juror D	Juror E	Juror F	Juror G	Rank	Points	Rank	Points
01	Denmark	6	8	3	12	3	15	18	7	4	18	
02	Germany											
03	Israel	4	21	9	2	8	19	10	8	3	1	12
04	Belgium	14	19	4	11	13	20	24	17		24	
05	Albania	16	14	24	16	18	9	13	21		12	
06	Greece	9	11	5	9	6	8	23	12		3	8
07	Ukraine	15	5	22	17	10	13	15	18		9	2
08	Australia	1	13	10	20	4	6	17	6	5	11	
09	Serbia	21	17	23	24	16	7	9	20		17	
10	Malta	10	6	15	3	17	24	19	13		20	
11	Czechia	11	3	11	8	20	16	22	14		21	
12	Bulgaria	8	16	2	18	9	5	2	4	7	2	10
13	Croatia	2	20	14	19	14	17	1	9	2	4	7
14	United Kingdom	24	23	18	23	23	22	14	24		23	
15	France	5	12	7	13	15	3	3	5	6	15	
16	Moldova	19	24	16	10	22	21	21	23		8	3
17	Finland	3	10	21	4	5	1	6	3	8	13	
18	Poland	20	1	1	5	12	2	8	1	12	7	4
19	Lithuania	22	7	17	22	19	4	12	15		22	
20	Sweden	12	9	12	7	2	11	7	10	1	14	
21	Cyprus	18	18	20	21	24	10	16	22		19	
22	Italy	7	4	13	1	1	12	5	2	10	5	6
23	Norway	17	2	8	15	7	14	11	11		16	
24	Romania	13	22	19	14	11	18	4	16		10	1
25	Austria	23	15	6	6	21	23	20	19		6	5
