= Goin' to L.A. =

Single by Pietro Lombardi

from the album Pietro Style
- Released: November 11, 2011
- Recorded: 2011
- Genre: Pop
- Length: 3:08
- Label: Universal Music Germany
- Songwriter(s): Dieter Bohlen
- Producer(s): Dieter Bohlen

Pietro Lombardi singles chronology
"I Miss You" (2011)	"Goin' to L.A." (2011)	"It’s Christmas Time" (2011)

"Goin' to L.A." is a song recorded by German singer Pietro Lombardi from his second studio album Pietro Style (2011). It was written and produced by DSDS jury member Dieter Bohlen. The song was released on November 11, 2011.

== Music video ==
A music video to accompany the release of "Goin' to L.A." was first released onto YouTube on 29 October 2011 at a total length of three minutes and nine seconds.

== Track listing ==
Digital download

1. "Goin' to L.A." - 3:08
2. "It's Christmas Time" - 3:00
3. "Goin' to L.A." (Music video) - 3:09

== Chart performance ==
Chart (2011)	Peak position
Austria (Ö3 Austria Top 40)	55
Germany (GfK)	22

== Release history ==
Region	Date	Format	Label
Germany	11 November 2011	Digital download	Universal Music Germany
