= Wavvyboi =

Liechtensteiner Singer Songwriter

Simon Vogt-Grande (born 28 April 1998), known professionally as Wavvyboi, is a Liechtensteiner singer-songwriter.

== Career ==
At the age of twelve Wavvyboi Started Piano lessons with Liechtensteiner pianist Stefan Frommelt, during this time Frommelt Introduced them to music and taught them the basics of music production. As a teenager, they became a vocalist for various alternative bands, after becoming a vocalist they started uploading cover songs on the music streaming site SoundCloud. After Sharing their music on a Facebook group, they drew attention from German artists such as DatAdam who invited them to their studio. After this, they decided to drop out of school and focus on their music career. In 2019 they toured Austria, Germany, and Switzerland as part of the musicians' collective CYBER-GEN. After signing with Space Music records, they collaborated with other artists such as Taddl, producer Marley (Formerly known as DatAdam) and label mate Kelvyn Colt. With Colt, they produced the song for a Campaign by Levi's and About You for which Wavyboi was the face of the campaign, which is themed around self-determination and individuality.

In 2022 they released the album all die engel & daemonen sind wir selbst (all the angels & daemons are ourselves) with the help of independent music distributor Groove Attack and would reach number 9 in the German charts.

Wavyboi tried to represent Germany at Eurovision 2026 with their song Black Glitter. They would finish second to Sarah Engels in Germany's National Selection for Eurovision. At the contest itself, they were the official spokesperson for Germany and announced the jury's points.

== Personal life ==
Wavyboi identifies as non-binary and has stated on their social media profiles that their pronouns are he/she/they. The theme of self-discovery, which is present throughout their music, is also reflected by their appearance. Their aesthetic incorporates elements of Goth and Grunge fashion as well as stereotypically feminine elements such as makeup and nail polish.

Originally from Balzers, as of 2020 they live in the German city of Cologne.

== Discography ==
=== Albums ===
- 2022: all die engel & daemonen sind wir selbst (Self Published/Groove Attack)

=== EPs ===
- 2017: Blonde Boy Fantasy (as Simon Slowkiss, Self Published)

=== Singles ===
- 2018: fall in love with me
- 2019: dreifaches_x (with TJ_babybrain)
- 2019: done mit dir (with John on a Mission)
- 2019: vieles was in mir bricht
- 2019: coupé
- 2019: mich zu wehren faellt mir schwer
- 2020: pick me up when I'm down
- 2020: weisse rosen
- 2020: twilight
- 2020: narben
- 2020: phantom
- 2021: spiel mit mir
- 2021: blister – acoustic
- 2021: bleach
- 2021: verlorene tage
- 2021: highway to hell
- 2021: no one (with Kelvyn Colt)
- 2022: blister
- 2023: nie wieder weinen
- 2023: perfekte fehler
- 2023: parfum
- 2023: engel & daemonen
- 2023: kuss
- 2024: weisses licht
- 2024: sterne
- 2026: black glitter
- 2026: wanderlust
