= Pietro Style =

Studio album by Pietro Lombardi
- Released: 2 December 2011
- Length: 40:36
- Label: Warner Music Germany
- Producer: Dieter Bohlen

Pietro Lombardi chronology
Jackpot (2011)	Pietro Style (2011)	Dream Team (2013)

Singles from Pietro Style
- 1. "Goin' to L.A." Released: November 11, 2011

Pietro Style is the second album by German singer Pietro Lombardi. It was released by Warner Music Germany on December 2, 2011 in German-speaking Europe. Produced by Dieter Bohlen, the album's first single, "Goin' to L.A.," was released on November 11, 2011.

== Singles ==
- "Goin' to L.A." was the first single released from the album. It was released on November 11, 2011. The song reached number 22 in Germany and number 55 in Austria.

== Track listing ==
All tracks written and produced by Dieter Bohlen; co-produced by Joachim "Jeo" Mezei.

Pietro Style track listing
No.	Title	Length
1.	"Goin' to L.A."	3:09
2.	"Baby Feel My Body Rock"	3:15
3.	"It Cuts Like a Knife"	3:43
4.	"When Your Heart Is Missing a Beat"	3:00
5.	"Come Back and Stay With Me"	3:31
6.	"Hey Girl!"	3:22
7.	"Tonight Could Be the Night"	3:25
8.	"I Was So Blind"	3:22
9.	"Cannot Stand the Pain"	3:32
10.	"I Promised My Heart to You"	3:43
11.	"I'll Never Give Up"	3:30
12.	"It's Christmas Time"	3:00
13.	"I'll Never Give Up" (Slow Version)	3:23
Total length:		40:36

== Charts ==
Weekly chart performance for Pietro Style
Chart (2011)	Peak position
Austrian Albums (Ö3 Austria)	30
German Albums (Offizielle Top 100)	17
Swiss Albums (Schweizer Hitparade)	66

== Release history ==
Pietro Style release history
Region	Date	Format	Label	Ref(s)
Germany	2 December 2011	Digital download	Universal Music Germany	
