= Fire (Sarah Engels song) =

2026 single by Sarah Engels

Single by Sarah Engels
- Released: 30 January 2026
- Length: 2:57
- Label: Wird Wild; Electrola
- Songwriters: Valentin Boes; Sarah Engels; Luisa Heinemann; Raphael Lott; Dario Schürmann
- Producers: Valentin Boes; Raphael Lott; Malte Niehaus; OSSIA Berlin; Dario Schürmann

Sarah Engels singles chronology
"Liebe gibt nie auf" (2026)	"Fire" (2026)

Music video
- "Fire" on YouTube

Eurovision Song Contest 2026 entry
- Country: Germany
- Artist: Sarah Engels
- Language: English

Finals performance
- Final result: 23rd
- Final points: 12

Entry chronology
- ◄ "Baller" (2025)

Official performance video
- "Fire" (first semi-final) on YouTube "Fire" (grand final) on YouTube

"Fire" is a song recorded by German singer Sarah Engels. It was written by Engels along with Valentin Boes, Luisa Heinemann, Raphael Lott, and Dario Schürmann, with production overseen by Boes, Lott, Malte Niehaus, OSSIA Berlin, and Schürmann. It was released by Wird Wild and Electrola on 30 January 2026 and represented Germany in the Eurovision Song Contest 2026. The song reached the top thirty on the German Singles Chart.

== Background ==
In an Instagram story posted on 13 January 2026, Sarah Engels announced that she would be revealing major news in the coming days. She hinted that it could represent the "biggest opportunity" of her career. Media outlets speculated that she was alluding to participation in the national selection for the Eurovision Song Contest 2026. The following day, it was announced that her new single "Fire" would be released in two weeks. On 15 January it was confirmed that the song would serve as Engels' entry in the selection process.

== Music video ==
A music video for "Fire", directed and edited by Daniel Priess, was filmed at the MMC Film & TV Studios in Cologne and released on 30 January 2026. Production was overseen by Alexander Pahl for aPahl Production, with choreography by India Rischko.

== Eurovision Song Contest 2026 ==
=== National final ===
On 28 February 2026, Engels competed with "Fire" in Eurovision Song Contest – Das deutsche Finale 2026, the national selection for the Eurovision Song Contest 2026, which she won with 38.30% of the televote.

=== At Eurovision ===
The Eurovision Song Contest 2026 took place at Wiener Stadthalle in Vienna, Austria, and consisted of two semi-finals held on the respective dates of 12 and 14 May and the final on 16 May 2026. As Germany is a member of the Big Five, "Fire" automatically qualified for the grand final. Nevertheless, the song was performed in the first semi-final albeit in a non-competitive spot, between Israel's Noam Bettan and Belgium's Essyla.

Engels performed a repeat of her performance in the grand final on 16 May. The song was performed second, after Denmark's Søren Torpegaard Lund and before Israel's Noam Bettan. In the final, "Fire" finished in 23rd place with 12 points, all of which came from the jury vote.

== Track listings ==
- Digital single
  - "Fire" – 2:57
- VIZE remix single
  - "Fire" (VIZE Remix) – 2:33
  - "Fire" – 2:57
- Acoustic remix single
  - "Fire" (Acoustic Version) – 2:38
  - "Fire" – 2:57
  - "Fire" (VIZE Remix) – 2:33

== Credits and personnel ==
Credits taken from the liner notes of "Fire."

- Valentin Boes – producer, writer
- Sam Donalies – engineer
- Sarah Engels – vocals, writer
- Luisa Heinemann – writer
- Raphael Lott – engineer, producer, writer
- Malte Niehaus – producer
- OSSIA Berlin – producer
- Dario Schürmann – producer, writer

== Charts ==
=== Weekly charts ===
Weekly chart performance
Chart (2026)	Peak position
Austria (Ö3 Austria Top 40)	21
Germany (GfK)	27
Greece International (IFPI)	63
Kazakhstan Airplay (TopHit)	12
Sweden Heatseeker (Sverigetopplistan)	10
UK Singles Sales (OCC)	57

=== Monthly charts ===
Monthly chart performance
Chart (2026)	Peak position
Kazakhstan Airplay (TopHit)	17

== Release history ==
Release history for "Fire"
Region	Date	Format	Label	Ref
Various	30 January 2026	digital download	Wird Wild; Electrola	
