= Call My Name (Pietro Lombardi song) =

2011 single by Pietro Lombardi

Single by Pietro Lombardi

from the album Jackpot
- Released: 7 May 2011
- Length: 3:42
- Label: Polydor
- Songwriter: Dieter Bohlen
- Producer: Dieter Bohlen

Pietro Lombardi singles chronology
"Call My Name" (2011)	"I Miss You" (2011)

"Call My Name" is a song recorded by German singer Pietro Lombardi. It was written and produced by Dieter Bohlen for his first studio album Jackpot (2011). The song served as Lombardi's coronation song after winning the eighth season of Deutschland sucht den Superstar (DSDS). It was released by Polydor Records as his debut single on 7 May 2011 in German-speaking Europe.

== Influences ==
Klaus Friedler, a music academic at the University of Hamburg, commented that there were several similarities between the song and American pop band OneRepublic's "Marchin On."

== Track listing ==
All tracks written and produced by Dieter Bohlen; co-produced by Joachim "Jeo" Mezei.

2-Track single
No.	Title	Length
1.	"Call My Name" (single version)	3:42
2.	"Call My Name" (club mix)	4:12

== Credits and personnel ==
Credits are taken from Jackpot liner notes.

- Dieter Bohlen – producer, writer
- Sascha Kramer – photography
- Joachim "Jeo" Mezei – co-producer, mixing
- Ronald Reinsberg – artwork

== Charts ==
=== Weekly charts ===
Weekly chart performance for "Call My Name"
Chart (2011)	Peak position
Austria (Ö3 Austria Top 40)	1
Germany (GfK)	1
Switzerland (Schweizer Hitparade)	1

=== Year-end charts ===
Year-end chart performance for "Call My Name"
Chart (2011)	Position
Germany (GfK)	5
Switzerland (Schweizer Hitparade)	39

== Certifications ==
Certifications for "Call My Name"
Region	Certification	Certified units/sales
Austria (IFPI Austria)	Platinum	30,000^{*}
Germany (BVMI)	Platinum	300,000^{^}
Switzerland (IFPI Switzerland)	Gold	15,000^{^}
^{*} Sales figures based on certification alone.^{^} Shipments figures based on certification alone.

== Sarah Engels version ==
"Call My Name"

Single by Sarah Engels

from the album Heartbeat
- Released: May 7, 2011
- Length: 3:44
- Label: Polydor
- Songwriter: Dieter Bohlen
- Producer: Dieter Bohlen

Sarah Engels singles chronology
"Call My Name" (2011)	"I Miss You" (2011)

Apart from Pietro Lombardi, "Call My Name" was also recorded by Deutschland sucht den Superstar runner-up Sarah Engels. Her version was released on 7 May 2011, the same day as Lombardi's, and debuted at number two in Austria, Germany, and Switzerland, ranking just behind Lombardi's recording in each of those charts.

=== Track listing ===
All tracks written and produced by Dieter Bohlen; co-produced by Joachim "Jeo" Mezei.

2-Track single
No.	Title	Length
1.	"Call My Name" (single version)	3:44
2.	"Call My Name" (club mix)	4:13

== Credits and personnel ==
Credits are taken from Heartbeat liner notes.

- Dieter Bohlen – producer, writer
- Sascha Kramer – photography
- Joachim "Jeo" Mezei – co-producer, mixing
- Ronald Reinsberg – artwork

=== Weekly charts ===
Weekly chart performance for "Call My Name"
Chart (2011)	Peak position
Austria (Ö3 Austria Top 40)	2
Germany (GfK)	2
Switzerland (Schweizer Hitparade)	2

=== Year-end charts ===
Year-end chart performance for "Call My Name"
Chart (2011)	Position
Germany (GfK)	92
