= Genau hier =

Song by Sarah Lombardi

Single by Sarah Lombardi

from the album Zurück zu mir
- Released: 13 April 2018
- Length: 3:16
- Label: El Cartel; Universal
- Songwriters: Florian Cojocaru; Elżbieta Steinmetz
- Producer: Hermann Niesig

Sarah Lombardi singles chronology
"Teil von mir" (2016)	"Genau hier" (2018)	"Einzigartig schön" (2018)

"Genau hier" (English: "Right Here") is a song by German singer Sarah Lombardi. It was written by Florian Cojocaru and Elżbieta Steinmetz for her third studio album Zurück zu mir (2018), while production was helmed by Hermann Niesig. The song was released on 13 April 2018 by El Cartel Music and the Universal Music Group as the album's lead single.

== Track listing ==
- Digital download
1. "Genau hier" – 3:16

== Charts ==
Chart (2018)	Peak position
Austria (Ö3 Austria Top 40)	51
Germany (GfK)	31
Switzerland (Schweizer Hitparade)	67
