= Pietro Basile =

German-Italian singer-songwriter

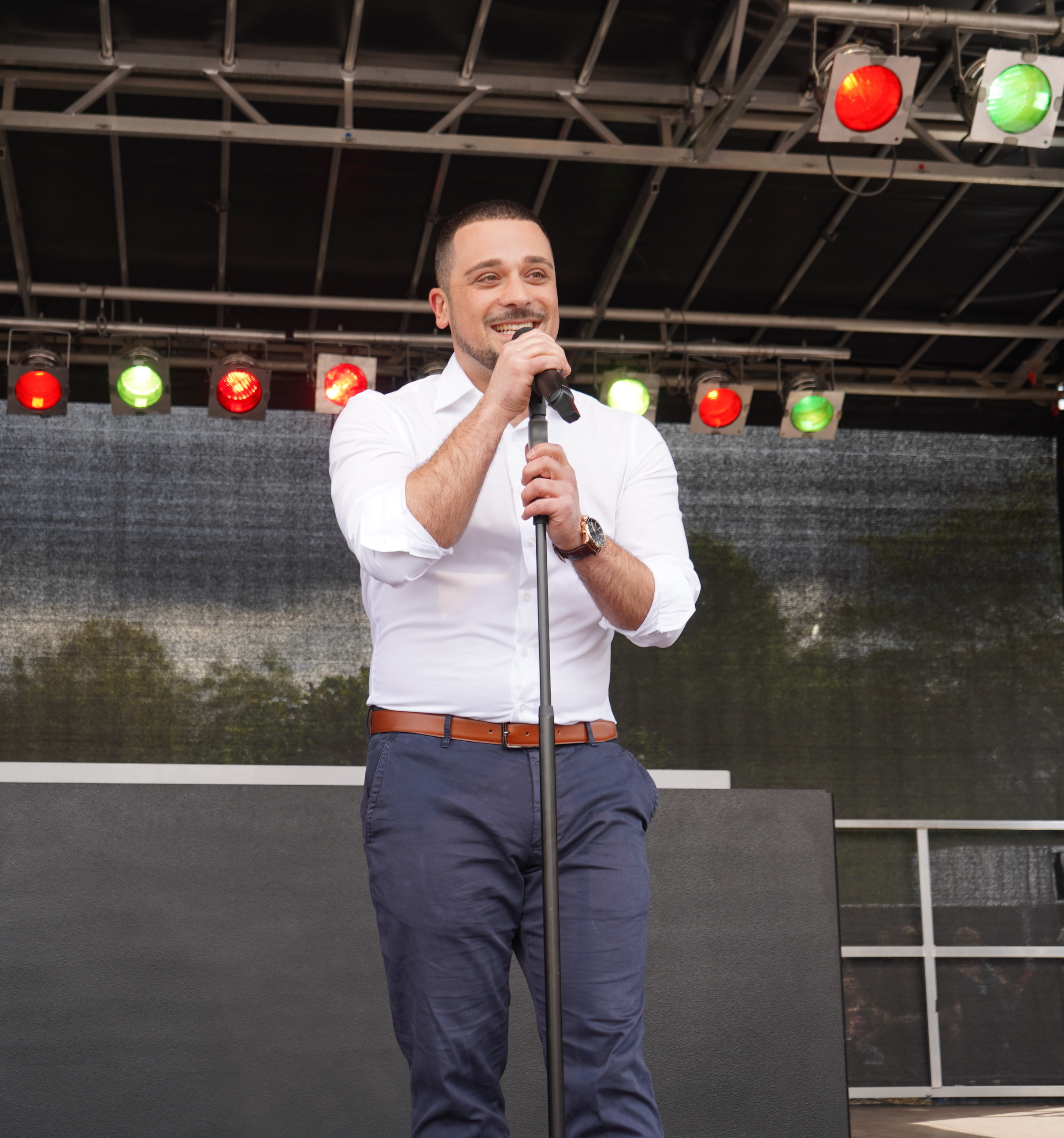
- Basile in May 2023
- Born: 21 July 1989 (age 37); Munich, Germany
- Occupation: Singer-songwriter
- Musical career
- Genres: Pop
- Instrument: Vocals
- Years active: 2007–present
- Labels: Sony; RTL Zwei; Universal; Polydor
- Website: juwel-musik.de/profil-pietro-basile

Pietro Basile (born 21 July 1989) is a German-Italian singer-songwriter based in Germany.

== Career ==
=== 2007–2018: Career beginnings ===
In 2007 Pietro Basile met producer Simon Blaze, with whom he produced his first songs. A year later he started releasing songs in Italian and German.

After his first German-Italian single "Scusami" was a viral success and was streamed several million times on YouTube, he signed his first record deal with the label TeeAge-Beatz in 2009. His first compilation Io canto was released in the same year, followed by a European tour with shows in Germany, Austria and Switzerland.

=== 2019–present: Debut Album ===
In 2019, Basile signed with Alana Productions and worked with label owner and producer Ivo Moring and former Schiller-member Mirko von Schlieffen on his debut album. In late 2019 Alana Productions signed a label deal with RTL Zwei's record label El Cartel Music and a distribution deal with Universal Music's Polydor Records/Island Records. Basile's duet-single, "Ich liebe nur dich" featuring Sarah Engels, was released on 13 September 2019.

On 15 May 2020, Basile released his digital single "Tanz mit mir (Ritmo dell'amore)". In October 2020, Basile collaborated with DJ Herzbeat on the song "Canto Per Te", which was released on October 16, along with his digital single "Zuhause (Christmas Time)".

In 2021, Basile signed a new distribution deal with Sony Music. In October 2021, Basile collaborated with K-Fly on the song "Hast Du mich jemals geliebt?", which was released on October 1. In November, he once again collaborated with Sarah Engels on the song "Mama", which was released on November 19.

On 8 April 2022, Basile released the digital single "Sempre Tu (Keine ist wie du)". The digital single "Va bene (Alles was ich will)" was released on 29 July 2022. On 21 October 2022, he released the digital single "Viva l'amore".

In 2023, Basile signed with the management company Juwel Musik. In January 2023, Basile collaborated with K-Fly again on the piano version "Io sto male senza te", which was released on January 27. In September 2023, Basile collaborated with former The Voice Kids and The Voice of Germany contestant Luna Farina on the song "Grande Amore", which was released on 8 September.

== Discography ==
=== Albums ===
Title	Album details	Peak chart positions
Title	Album details	GER
Grande Amore	Released: 6 October 2023; Label: Sony Music, RTLZWEI, ALANAproductions, Juwel Musik; Formats: CD, digital download, streaming; Track listing: 1. "Tanz mit mir (Ritmo dell'amore)" 2. "Nur noch eine Nacht" (featuring Cristobal, K-Fly); 3. "Ich liebe nur dich" (featuring Sarah Engels); 4. "Sempre Tu (Keine ist wie du)" 5. "Va bene (Alles was ich will)" 6. "La vida loca" 7. "Hast Du mich jemals geliebt?" (featuring K-Fly); 8. "Mama" (featuring Sarah Engels); 9. "Wir beide fangen Sterne"; 10. "Grande Amore" (featuring Luna Farina); 11. "Viva l'amore" 12. "Gianna"; 13. "Te Quiero (Oley, Oley, Ola)" (featuring Ellen Lia); 14. "Sempre Tu (Keine ist wie du)" (Remix); 15. "Mama (Unplugged)" (featuring Sarah Engels); 16. "Grande Amore" (solo version)	— (Note: "Grande Amore" peaked at number 4 on the Schlager Charts.)

=== Compilation albums ===
Title	Album details
Io canto	Released: 2009; Label: TeeAge-Beatz; Formats: CD
Best Of	Released: 13 May 2017; Label: iGrooveNext.com, Pietro B; Formats: digital download, streaming; Track listing: 1. "Con te" 2. "Cose da dimenticare" 3. "Du bist da für mich" (featuring Antonio Gerardi); 4. "Du fehlst mir" (featuring Kyra); 5. "Eri tu" (featuring Twentyone); 6. "Forze Italia"; 7. "Grande amore" (featuring Chris Sandy); 8. "Io canto" 9. "Io sto male senza te" 10. "Lass ihn gehen" 11. "Non ce la faccio più" 12. "Parlami di te" 13. "Scusami"; 14. "Sò dove sei" 15. "Ti amo" 16. "Ti voglio" 17. "Scusami" (Italian version); 18. "Tausend Fragen"

=== Singles ===
==== As lead artist ====
Title	Year	Peak chart positions			Album
Title	Year	GER	AUT	SWI	Album
"Ich liebe nur dich" (featuring Sarah Engels)	2019	49	56	24	Grande Amore
"Tanz mit mir (Ritmo dell'amore)"	2020	—	—	—	Grande Amore
"Zuhause (Christmas Time)"	2020	—	—	—	Non-album single
"Hast Du mich jemals geliebt?" (featuring K-Fly)	2021	—	—	—	Grande Amore
"Mama" (featuring Sarah Engels)	2021	— (Note: "Mama" peaked at number 5 on the Single Trending Charts.)	—	—	Grande Amore
"Sempre Tu (Keine ist wie du)"	2022	—	—	—	Grande Amore
"Va bene (Alles was ich will)"	2022	—	—	—	Grande Amore
"Viva l'amore"	2022	—	—	—	Grande Amore
"Io sto male senza te (Piano Version)" (featuring K-Fly)	2023	—	—	—	Non-album single
"Grande Amore" (featuring Luna Farina)	2023	—	—	—	Grande Amore
"Gianna"	2023	34	7	—	Grande Amore
"—" denotes items that did not chart or were not released in that region.

==== Collaborations ====
Title	Year	Album
"Canto Per Te" (with DJ Herzbeat)	2020	Dancefieber
"Save the Earth" (with Giovanni Puocci)	2022	Save the Earth
"—" denotes items that did not chart or were not released in that region.

=== Composing and songwriting ===
Gesellschaft für musikalische Aufführungs- und mechanische Vervielfältigungsrechte (GEMA) IP-Name-Nr.: 00643767616, Registration Name: Pietro Basile

Song title	Album title	Performer	Lyrics	Composing	Note(s)
Forza Italia	Best Of	Pietro Basile	✓		
Du fehlst mir (Mi manchi)	Best Of	Pietro Basile featuring Kyra	✓		
Ti voglio	Best Of	Pietro Basile	✓		
Io canto	Best Of	Pietro Basile	✓		
Lost	Save the Earth	Giovanni Puocci featuring Pietro Basile	✓		
Scusami	Best Of	Pietro Basile	✓	✓	
Scusami - Italian Version	Best Of	Pietro Basile	✓	✓	
Io sto male senza te	Best Of	Pietro Basile featuring K-Fly	✓	✓	
Eri tu	Best Of	Pietro Basile featuring Twentyone	✓	✓	
Cose da dimenticare	Best Of	Pietro Basile	✓	✓	
Mama	Grande Amore	Pietro Basile	✓	✓	
Noch einmal geh ich nicht	Noch einmal geh ich nicht	Pietro Basile	✓	✓	
Vola con me	Vola con me	Pietro Basile	✓	✓	
Diese Tage	Diese Tage	Pietro Basile	✓	✓	
Bella Ciao	Bella Ciao	Pietro Basile	✓	✓	
Ich will dich nur verstehen	Ich will dich nur verstehen	Pietro Basile	✓	✓	
Ich liebe nur dich	Grande Amore	Pietro Basile featuring Sarah Engels	✓	✓	
Eine unter Tausend	Besonderer Mensch	K-Fly feat. Pietro Basile & Felix Hohleich	✓		
Save the Earth	Save the Earth	Giovanni Puocci featuring Pietro Basile	✓		
I nostri eroi	I nostri eroi	Various		✓	
Tanz mit mir (Ritmo dell'amore)	Grande Amore	Pietro Basile	✓	✓	
Canto Per Te	Dancefieber	DJ Herzbeat featuring Pietro Basile	✓		
Sempre Tu (Keine ist wie du)	Grande Amore	Pietro Basile	✓	✓	
Va bene (Alles was ich will)	Grande Amore	Pietro Basile	✓	✓	
Mama (feat. Sarah Engels)	Grande Amore	Pietro Basile featuring Sarah Engels	✓	✓	
Viva l'amore	Grande Amore	Pietro Basile	✓	✓	
Grande Amore	Grande Amore	Pietro Basile featuring Luna Farina	✓	✓	
