= Only for You (song) =

Single by Sarah Engels

from the album Heartbeat
- B-side: "We've Got Tonight"
- Released: 2 September 2011
- Recorded: 2011
- Genre: Pop
- Length: 3:16
- Label: Universal Music
- Songwriter(s): Dieter Bohlen
- Producer(s): Dieter Bohlen

Sarah Engels singles chronology
"I Miss You" (2011)	"Only for You" (2011)

"Only for You" is a song recorded by Sarah Engels from her first studio album Heartbeat. It was written and produced by DSDS jury member Dieter Bohlen. The song was released on 2 September 2011.

== Music video ==
A music video to accompany the release of "Only for You" was first released onto YouTube on 30 August 2011 at a total length of three minutes and sixteen seconds.

== Track listing ==
Digital download

1. "Only for You" (Single version) - 3:16
2. "We've Got Tonight" - 3:38

== Chart performance ==
Chart (2011)	Peak position
Austria (Ö3 Austria Top 40)	47
Germany (GfK)	33

== Release history ==
Region	Date	Format	Label
Germany	2 September 2011	Digital Download	Universal Music
