= I Miss You (Sarah Engels song) =

Single by Sarah Engels & Pietro Lombardi

from the album Heartbeat
- Released: 17 June 2011
- Length: 3:31
- Label: Polydor
- Songwriter: Dieter Bohlen
- Producer: Dieter Bohlen

Sarah Engels singles chronology
| "Call My Name" (2011) | "I Miss You" (2011) | "Only for You" (2011) |

Pietro Lombardi singles chronology
| "Call My Name" (2011) | "I Miss You" (2011) | "Goin' to L.A." (2011) |

"I Miss You" is a song recorded by Sarah Engels from her first studio album Heartbeat. It features vocals from Pietro Lombardi. It was written and produced by DSDS jury member Dieter Bohlen. The song was released on 17 June 2011.

== Music video ==
A music video to accompany the release of "I Miss You" was first released onto YouTube on 15 June 2011 at a total length of three minutes and thirty-two seconds.

== Track listing ==
Digital download

1. "I Miss You" (Single version) - 3:31
2. "I Miss You" (Club Mix) - 3:56

== Charts ==
=== Weekly charts ===
Weekly chart performance for "I Miss You"
| Chart (2011) | Peak position |
|---|---|
| Austria (Ö3 Austria Top 40) | 6 |
| Germany (GfK) | 2 |
| German Download (GfK) | 4 |
| Switzerland (Schweizer Hitparade) | 14 |

=== Year-end charts ===
Year-end chart performance for "I Miss You"
| Chart (2011) | Position |
|---|---|
| Germany (GfK) | 77 |
