= Philippe Bühler =

German singer-songwriter, dancer, record producer and music manager (born 1981)

- Also known as: Philippe Heithier; Philippe
- Born: 29 November 1981 (age 44); Friedrichshafen, West Germany
- Genre: Pop
- Occupations: Singer-songwriter; dancer; record producer; music manager

Philippe Bühler (born 29 November 1981), also known as Philippe Heithier (named after his mother's birth name), is a German singer-songwriter, dancer, record producer and music manager. He came to fame as a contestant on the second season of Deutschland sucht den Superstar, the German version of Pop Idol. Bühler was eliminated in the top 3 after receiving 29.12 percent of the vote. Heithier is currently signed to Universal Music Publishing Group (UMPG) as part of Germany's roster.

== Discography ==
=== Albums ===
- 2008: TBA

=== Singles ===
- "Warum" (Why) (2005)
- "Ich kann Dich lieben" (I can love you) (2006)

== Performances ==
- Top 50: "I'll Be There" (Jackson 5)
- Wildcards: "Senorita" (Justin Timberlake)
- Top 13: "Cosmic Girl" (Jamiroquai)
- Top 11: "You Are Not Alone" (Michael Jackson)
- Top 10: "Tainted Love" (Soft Cell)
- Top 9: "Winter Wonderland"
- Top 8: "I'm Still Standing" (Elton John)
- Top 7: "For Once in My Life" (Stevie Wonder)
- Top 6: "September" (Earth, Wind, and Fire)
- Top 5: "Sie sieht mich nicht (She does not see me)" (Xavier Naidoo)
- Top 4: "Walking Away" (Craig David)
- Top 4: "Maria Maria" (Santana)
- Top 3: "A Whiter Shade of Pale" (Procol Harum)
- Top 3: "Respect" (Aretha Franklin) – Eliminado
