= Sarah Engels =

German singer and television personality (born 1992)

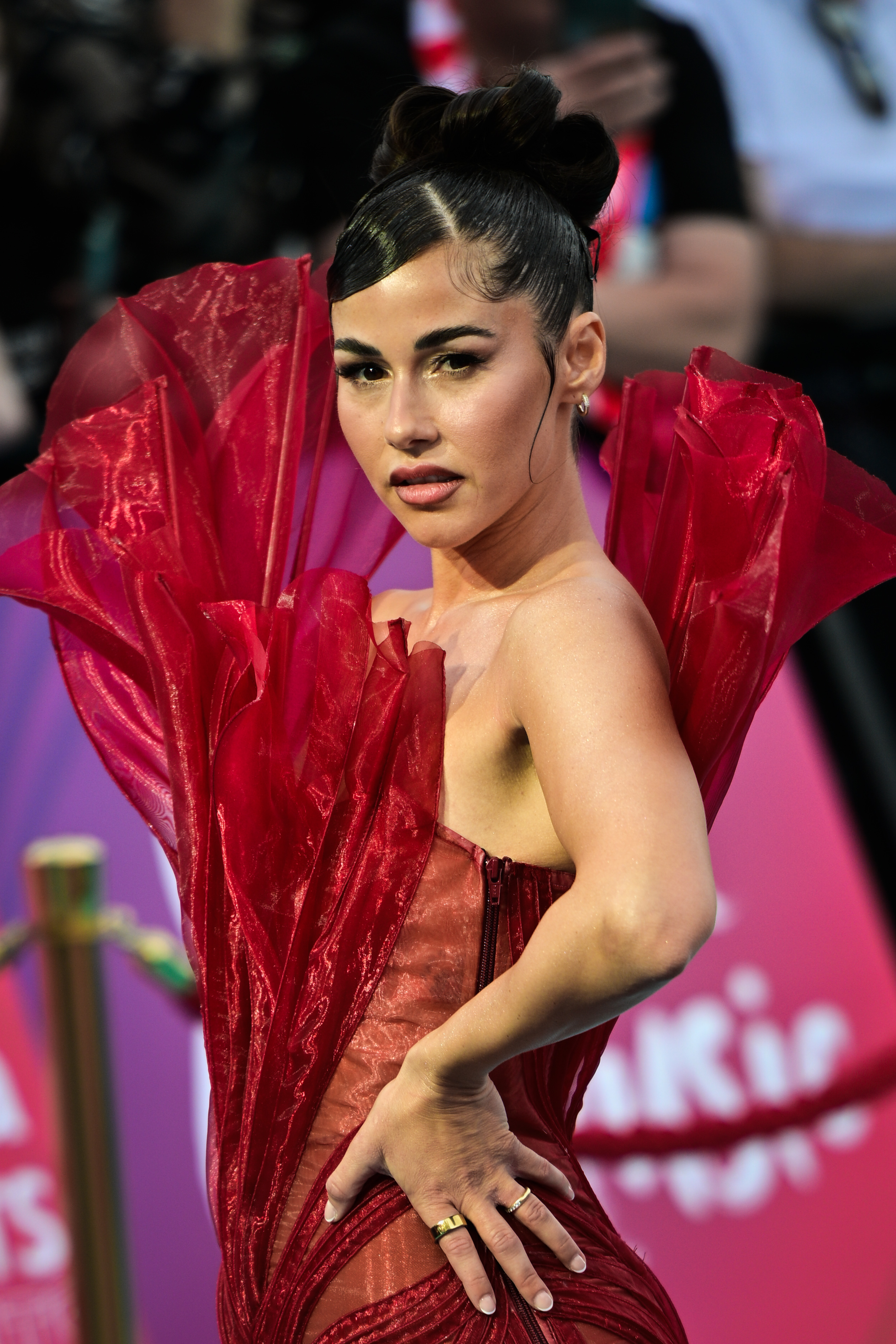
- Engels in 2026
- Born: 15 October 1992 (age 34); Cologne, Germany
- Other name: Sarah Lombardi
- Occupations: Singer; television personality
- Spouses: Pietro Lombardi (m. 2013; div. 2019); Julian Büscher (m. 2021)
- Children: 2
- Musical career
- Genre: Pop
- Instrument: Vocals
- Years active: 2009–present
- Label: Ariola Records

Sarah Engels (born 15 October 1992), formerly known as Sarah Lombardi, is a German singer and television personality. She rose to prominence in 2011 after participating in season 8 of Deutschland sucht den Superstar, where she was eliminated from the Top 10, only to return two shows later and eventually become the runner-up.

In 2020, she represented Italy at the Free European Song Contest 2020 with the song "Te Amo Mi Amor", finishing 13th out of 16. In 2026, she represented Germany at the Eurovision Song Contest 2026 in Vienna with her song "Fire" after winning the German selection for the contest.

== Career ==
=== Deutschland sucht den Superstar ===
Engels also participated in season 7 of Deutschland sucht den Superstar but was eliminated during the recall after her duet with Eugen Flittner. In season 8, she was eliminated in the first Live Show. Later on, she was asked to come back because RTL chief Tom Sänger (not the voters) had eliminated Nina Richel from the show, allegedly for health reasons.

=== By performance ===
Show (Original airdate)	Song (Artist)	Percentage of calls
Audition	Run (Snow Patrol)	
Recall	Footprints in the Sand (Leona Lewis)	
Recall	Run to You (Whitney Houston)	
Recall	A Moment Like This (Kelly Clarkson)	
Recall	Make You Feel My Love (Bob Dylan)	
Recall	Hurt (Christina Aguilera)	
Top 15 (19 February 2011)	One Moment in Time (Whitney Houston)	6,1% (9/15)
Top 10 (26 February 2011)	When You Believe (Mariah Carey ft. Whitney Houston)	6,7% (10/10)
Top 8 (12 March 2011)	I Wanna Dance with Somebody (Whitney Houston)	26,0% (1/8)
Top 7 (19 March 2011)	Release Me (Agnes)	17,3% (2/7)
Top 6 (first show) (2 April 2011)	Symphonie (Silbermond)	20,6%
Top 6 (first show) (2 April 2011)	Run (Snow Patrol)	20,6%
Top 6 (second show) (9 April 2011)	Walking on Sunshine (Katrina and the Waves)	17,8% (2/6)
Top 6 (second show) (9 April 2011)	Hurt (Christina Aguilera)	17,8% (2/6)
Top 5 (16 April 2011)	The Best (Bonnie Tyler)	26,5% (1/5)
Top 5 (16 April 2011)	What a Feeling (Irene Cara)	26,5% (1/5)
Top 5 (16 April 2011)	Footprints in the Sand (Leona Lewis)	26,5% (1/5)
Top 4 (23 April 2011)	I'm So Excited (The Pointer Sisters)	28,9% (2/4)
Top 4 (23 April 2011)	Eye of the Tiger (Survivor)	28,9% (2/4)
Top 4 (23 April 2011)	A Moment Like This (Kelly Clarkson)	28,9% (2/4)
Semi final (30 April 2011)	One Day in Your Life (Anastacia)	37,3% (1/3)
Semi final (30 April 2011)	Lady Marmalade (Labelle)	37,3% (1/3)
Semi final (30 April 2011)	Beautiful (Christina Aguilera)	37,3% (1/3)
Final (7 May 2011)	How Will I Know (Whitney Houston)	48,1% (2/2)
Final (7 May 2011)	Run (Snow Patrol)	48,1% (2/2)
Final (7 May 2011)	Call My Name (Winner's song by Dieter Bohlen, a bit altered for her)	48,1% (2/2)

=== 2025–present ===
In August 2025, Engels released her fourth studio album Strong Girls Club, a double album featuring German-language songs on one half and English-language songs on the other. It debuted and peaked at number 53 on the German Albums Chart before dropping off in its second week, becoming Engels' lowest-performing album to date. In November 2025, she began portraying the role of Satine in the Cologne production of the musical Moulin Rouge!, based on the same-titled 2001 film directed by Baz Luhrmann. In February 2026, Engels competed with her song "Fire" in the national selection for the Eurovision Song Contest 2026, which she went on to win. Due to Germany's status as a member of the Big Four, Engels' song was automatically qualified for a place in the contest's final on 16 May 2026, in which the song placed 23rd out of 25, scoring 12 points.

== Personal life ==
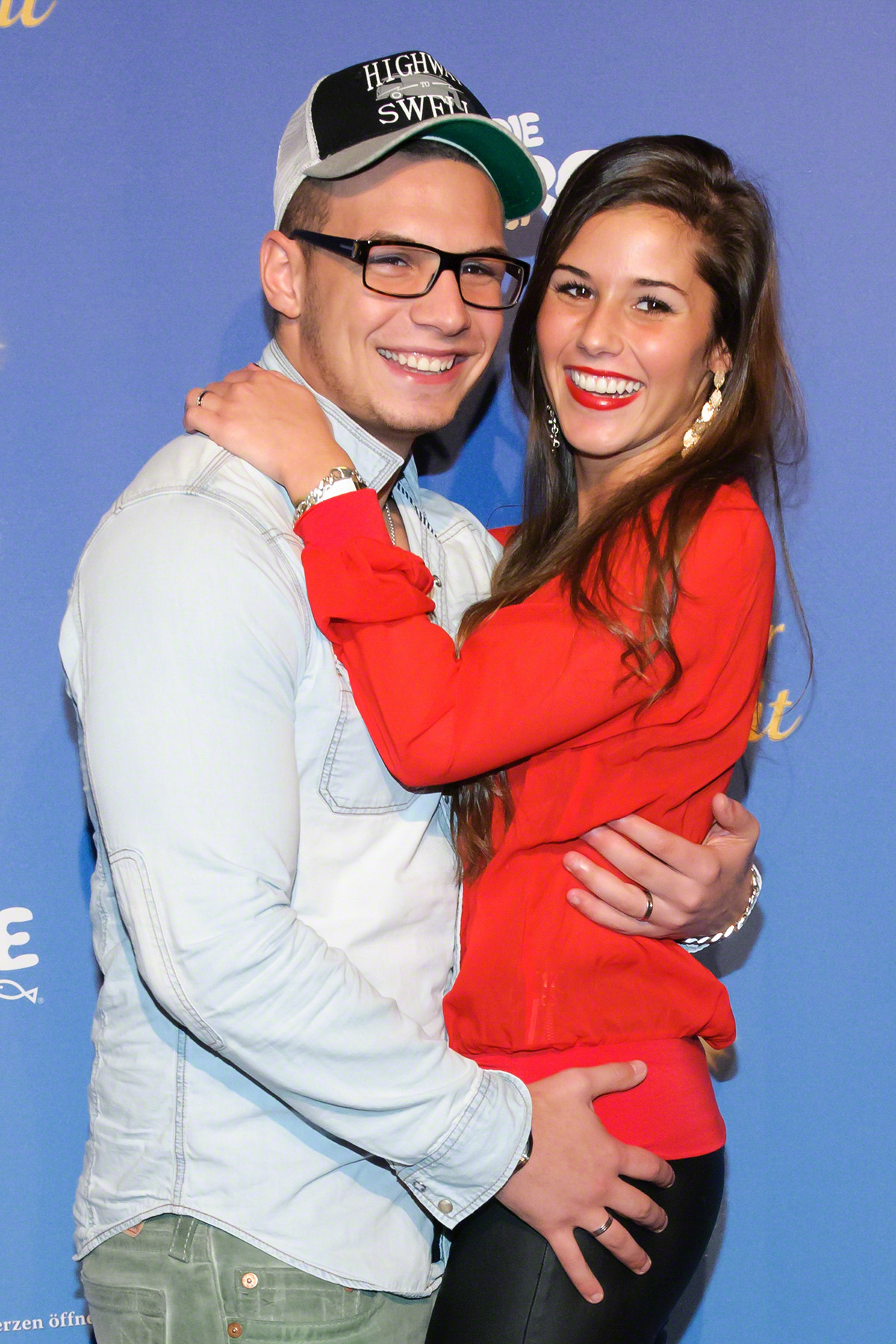
Sarah and Pietro Lombardi in 2013

Engels is of Italian descent. She married Pietro Lombardi in March 2013 and changed her name from Engels to Lombardi. On 19 June 2015, their son Alessio was born. She announced their separation in October 2016. In November 2020, she got engaged to football player Julian Büscher. The couple married in May 2021 and have had Sarah Engels's birth-name as their family name ever since. On 2 December 2021, their daughter Solea was born.

== Discography ==
=== Albums ===
Album title	Album details	Peak chart positions		
Album title	Album details	GER	AUT	SWI
Heartbeat	Released: 24 June 2011; Label: Universal	2	5	13
Dream Team (with Pietro Lombardi)	Released: 22 March 2013; Label: Universal	33	37	69
Teil von mir (with Pietro Lombardi)	Released: 18 March 2016; Label: GoodToGo	35	27	35
Zurück zu mir	Released: 4 May 2018; Label: El Cartel, Universal	18	18	21
Im Augenblick	Released: 23 April 2021; Label: Ariola	8	16	24
Strong Girls Club	Released: 22 August 2025; Label: Ariola	53	74	—

=== Singles ===
Title	Year	Peak chart positions							Album
Title	Year	GER	AUT	GRE Int.	KAZ Air.	SWE	SWI	UK Sales	Album
"Call My Name"	2011	2	2	*		—	2	—	Heartbeat
"I Miss You" (with Pietro Lombardi)	2011	2	6	*		—	14	—	Heartbeat
"Only for You"	2011	33	47	*		—	—	—	Heartbeat
"It's Christmas Time" (with Pietro Lombardi)	2011	—	75	*		—	—	—	Pietro Style
"Dream Team" (with Pietro Lombardi)	2013	41	60	*		—	65	—	Dream Team
"Nimmerland" (with Pietro Lombardi)	2015	32	28	*		—	—	—	Teil von mir
"Nur mit dir" (with Pietro Lombardi)	2016	40	42	*		—	—	—	Teil von mir
"Teil von mir" (with Pietro Lombardi)	2016	—	—	*		—	—	—	Teil von mir
"Genau hier"	2018	31	51	—	*	—	67	—	Zurück zu mir
"Weekend" (DJ Herzbeat featuring Sarah)	2019	83	—	—	*	—	—	—	Non-album singles
"Ich liebe nur dich" (Pietro Basile featuring Sarah)	2019	49	56	—	*	—	24	—	Non-album singles
"Te Amo Mi Amor"	2020	11	24	—	*	—	42	—	Im Augenblick
"Zoom"	2020	—	—	—	*	—	—	—	Im Augenblick
"Ich"	2021	92	—	—	*	—	—	—	Im Augenblick
"Love Is Love"	2021	—	—	—	*	—	—	—	Im Augenblick
"Mama" (with Pietro Basile)	2021	—	—	—	*	—	—	—	Non-album singles
"Gebe nicht auf"	2022	—	—	—	*	—	—	—	Non-album singles
"Ma Bonita" (with Luca Hänni)	2022	—	—	—	*	—	—	—	Non-album singles
"Gemeinsam stark" (with Mike Singer)	2023	—	—	—	—	—	—	—	Ladybug & Cat Noir: The Movie soundtrack
"Para siempre (Für immer)"	2023	—	—	—	—	—	—	—	Strong Girls Club
"Jemand" (with Joel Brandenstein)	2023	—	—	—	—	—	—	—	Strong Girls Club
"Für immer"	2025	—	—	—	—	—	—	—	Strong Girls Club
"Wie nie zuvor"	2025	—	—	—	—	—	—	—	Strong Girls Club
"Flieg mit mir"	2025	—	—	—	—	—	—	—	Non-album single
"Mit dir"	2025	—	—	—	—	—	—	—	Strong Girls Club
"Starke Mädchen"	2025	—	—	—	—	—	—	—	Strong Girls Club
"Ich bleib"	2025	—	—	—	—	—	—	—	Strong Girls Club
"Keep You Save"	2025	—	—	—	—	—	—	—	Strong Girls Club
"Gimme! Gimme! Gimme!"	2025	—	—	—	—	—	—	—	Strong Girls Club
"Liebe gibt nie auf" (with DJ Herzbeat)	2026	—	—	—	—	—	—	—	Non-album singles
"Fire"	2026	27	21	63	17	— (Note: "Fire" did not enter the Swedish Top 100 Singles Chart, but peaked at number 10 on the Sweden Heatseeker Songs.)	—	57	Non-album singles
"Celebration" (with 3rd Wall & Tr3nacria)	2026	—	—	—	—	—	—	—	Non-album singles
"—" denotes a recording that did not chart or was not released in that territory. "*" denotes that the chart did not exist at that time.

== Notes ==
Awards and achievements
Preceded by Abor & Tynna with "Baller"	Germany in the Eurovision Song Contest; 2026	Succeeded by TBD
