= Pietro Lombardi (singer) =

German singer

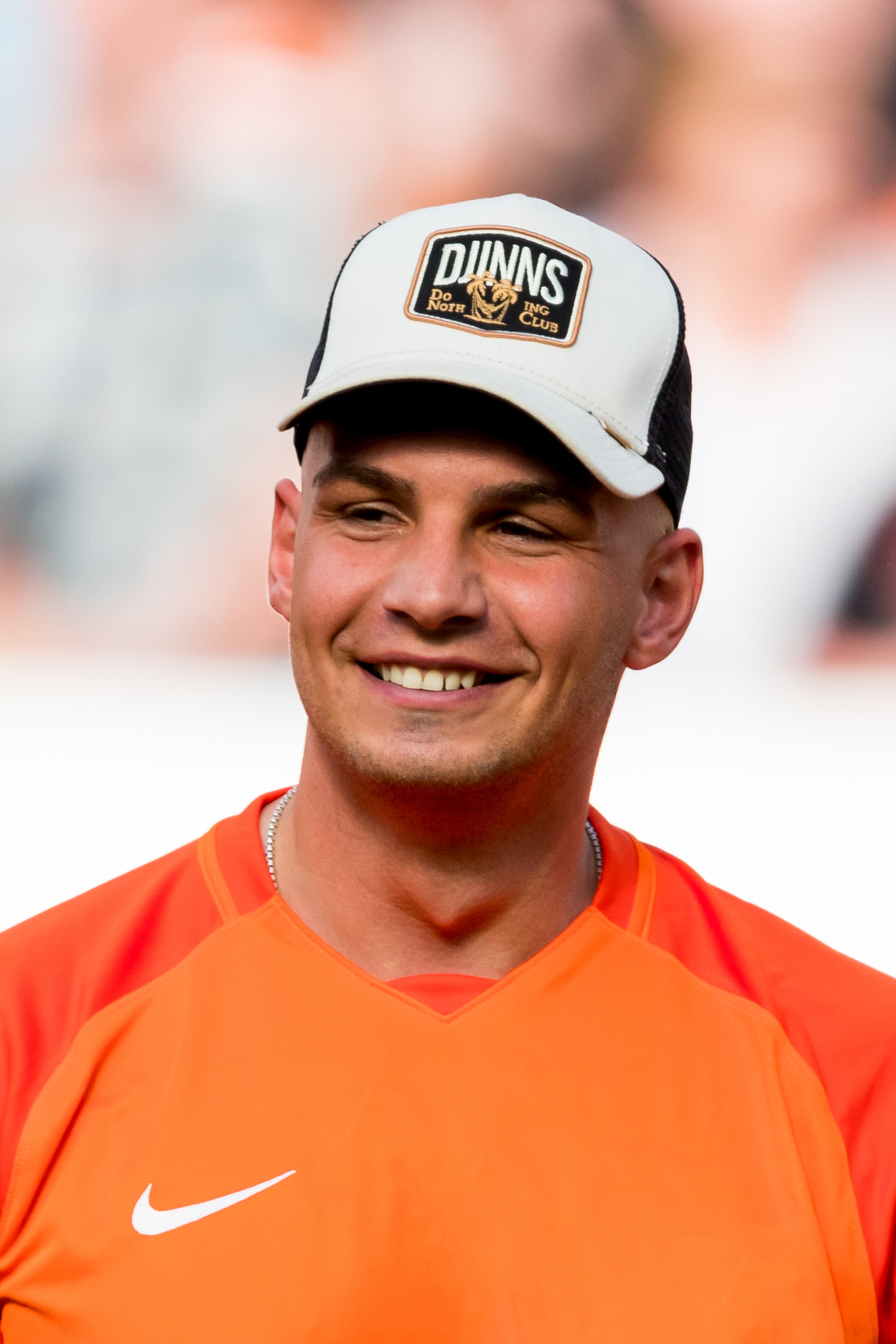
- Lombardi in 2019

Background information
- Born: 9 June 1992 (age 34); Karlsruhe, Germany
- Genres: Pop
- Occupation: Singer
- Years active: 2009–present
- Label: Universal Music Germany
- Website: pietrolombardimusic.de

Pietro Lombardi (born 9 June 1992) is a German singer and television personality. He was the winner of season 8 of Deutschland sucht den Superstar. He is best known for his R&B songs and ballads.

== Personal life ==
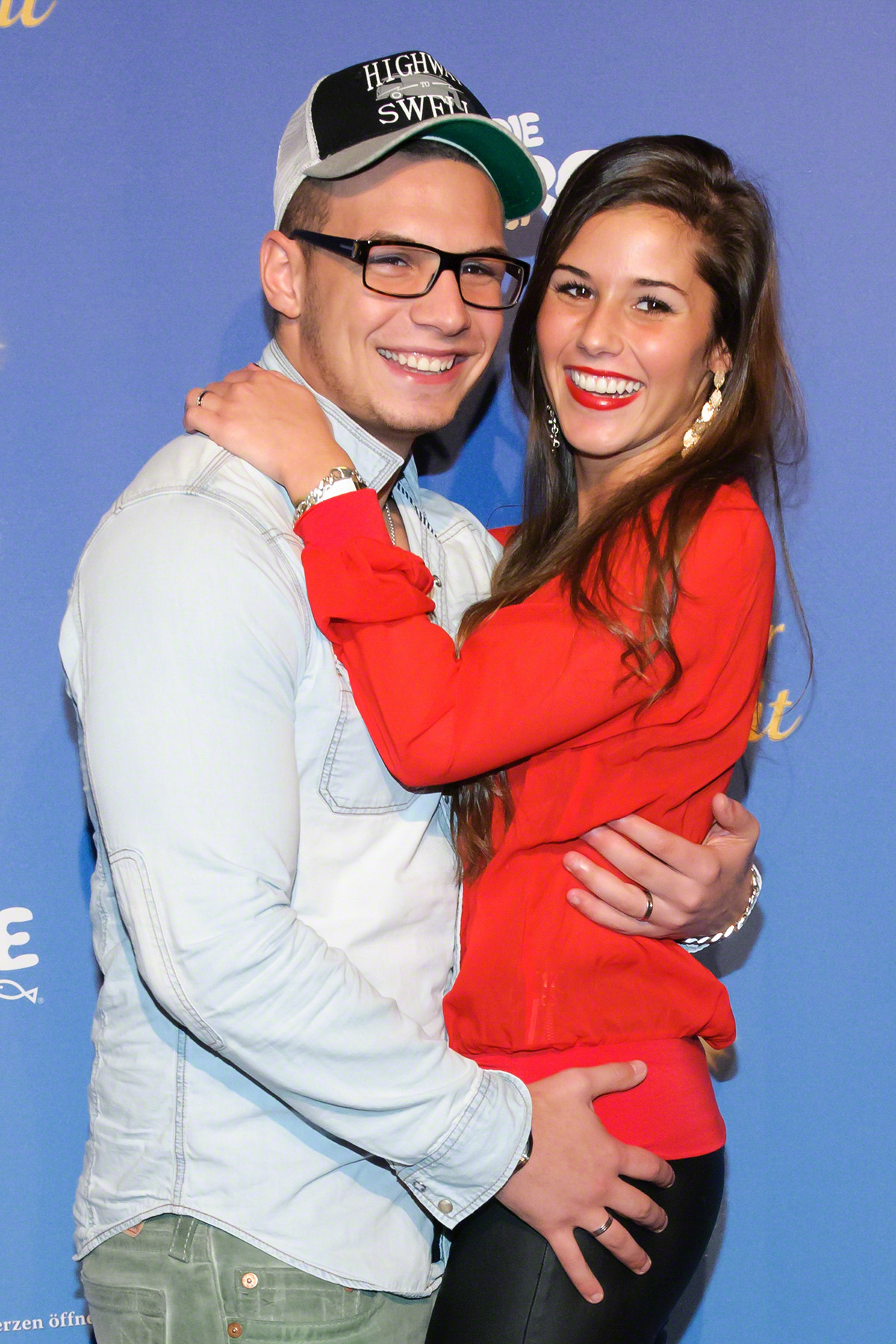
Pietro and Sarah Lombardi in 2013

Lombardi's parents are from Italy. He married Sarah Engels, the runner-up of his season, on 1 March 2013. Their son Alessio was born in June 2015. In October 2016, the couple announced their divorce. Lombardi announced his relationship with Laura Rypa in September 2020. After they broke up in October 2020, they officially became a couple again in June 2022. Their first son together, Leano, was born in January 2023 and their second son, Amelio, was born in August 2024. The couple was engaged as of October 2022. In August 2025 the couple broke up.

== Songs at Deutschland sucht den Superstar ==
Show (date)	Song	Original artist	Percentage/Place
Audition	Down	Jay Sean	Recall Ticket
Top 15 (19 February 2011)	Billionaire	Travie McCoy feat. Bruno Mars	12,7 % (2/15)
Top 10 (26 February 2011)	With You	Chris Brown	14,2 % (2/10)
Top 9 (5 March 2011)	Freaky Like Me	Madcon	17,2 % (1/9)
Top 8 (12 March 2011)	Down	Jay Sean	16,6 % (2/8)
Top 7 (19 March 2011)	Que Sera, Sera	Doris Day / Hermes House Band	22,0% (1/7)
Top 6 (2 April 2011)	Mein Stern	Ayman	28,4 % (1/6)
Top 6 (2 April 2011)	Every Breath You Take	The Police	28,4 % (1/6)
Top 6 (9 April 2011)	Don't Worry, Be Happy	Bobby McFerrin	24,9 % (1/6)
Top 6 (9 April 2011)	Mad World	Michael Andrews feat. Gary Jules	24,9 % (1/6)
Top 5 (16 April 2011)	I Just Called to Say I Love You	Stevie Wonder	23,5 % (2/5)
Top 5 (16 April 2011)	To Make You Feel My Love	Bob Dylan	23,5 % (2/5)
Top 5 (16 April 2011)	Sweat (A La La La La Long)	Inner Circle	23,5 % (2/5)
Top 4 (23 April 2011)	Just a Gigolo	David Lee Roth	30,0 % (1/4)
Top 4 (23 April 2011)	You Are Not Alone	Michael Jackson	30,0 % (1/4)
Top 4 (23 April 2011)	Gimme Hope Jo'anna	Eddy Grant	30,0 % (1/4)
Top 3 (30 April 2011)	Can You Feel the Love Tonight	Elton John	35,4% (2/3)
Top 3 (30 April 2011)	Wenn das Liebe ist	Glashaus	35,4% (2/3)
Top 3 (30 April 2011)	Mambo No. 5	Lou Bega	35,4% (2/3)
Final (7 May 2011)	Dance with My Father	Luther Vandross	51,9% (1/2)
Final (7 May 2011)	Que Sera, Sera	Doris Day	51,9% (1/2)
Final (7 May 2011)	Call My Name (Winner's song, composed by Dieter Bohlen based on the text Rafał Bugaj)	Pietro Lombardi	51,9% (1/2)

== Discography ==
=== Albums ===
Title	Details	Chart positions			Certifications
Title	Details	GER	AUT	SWI	Certifications
Jackpot	Released: 27 May 2011; Label: Universal Music Germany; Format: CD, Digital download	1	1	3	AUT: Platinum; GER: Platinum; SWI: Gold
Pietro Style	Released: 2 December 2011; Label: Universal Music Germany; Format: CD, digital download	17	30	66	
Dream Team (with Sarah Engels)	Released: 22 March 2013; Label: Universal Music Germany; Format: CD, digital download	33	37	69	
Teil von mir (with Sarah Engels)	Released: 18 March 2016; Label: GoodToGo; Format: CD, digital download	35	27	35	
Lombardi	Released: 20 March 2020; Label: Universal Music Germany; Format: Digital download, streaming	2	2	3	

=== Singles ===
Year	Title	Peak chart positions			Certification	Album
Year	Title	GER	AUT	SWI	Certification	Album
2011	"Call My Name"	1	1	1	AUT: Gold; GER: Platinum; SWI: Gold	Jackpot
2011	"Goin' to L.A."	22	55	—		Pietro Style
2017	"Mein Herz"	12	15	27		Non-album singles
2018	"Phänomenal"	1	2	8	GER: Gold	Non-album singles
2019	"Nur ein Tanz"	4	8	8		Lombardi
2019	"Bella Donna"	3	5	11		Lombardi
2019	"Macarena"	3	6	6		Lombardi
2019	"Standort" (featuring Dardan)	31	—	—		Lombardi
2020	"Es tut schon wieder weh"	11	23	32		Lombardi
2020	"Kämpferherz"	13	21	25		Lombardi
2020	"Cinderella"	4	11	21	GER: Gold	Non-album singles
2022	"Vorbei"	4	25	37		Non-album singles

=== Featured singles ===
Year	Title	Peak chart positions			Album
Year	Title	GER	AUT	SWI	Album
2011	"I Miss You" (with Sarah Engels)	2	6	14	Heartbeat
2011	"It's Christmas Time" (with Sarah Engels)	—	75	—	Non-album single
2013	"Dream Team" (with Sarah Engels)	41	60	65	Dream Team
2015	"Nimmerland" (with Sarah Engels)	32	28	—	Teil von mir
2016	"Nur mit dir" (with Sarah Engels)	40	42	—	Teil von mir
2016	"Teil von mir" (with Pietro Lombardi)	—	—	—	Teil von mir
2017	"Señorita" (with Kay One)	1	1	7	Makers Gonna Make
2019	"Senza te (Ohne dich)" (with Giovanni Zarrella)	68	69	78	Non-album single

=== Other charted songs ===
Year	Title	Peak chart positions		Album
Year	Title	AUT	SWI	Album
2011	"Qué Será, Será"	37	49	Jackpot
2011	"Down"	34	43	Jackpot

Preceded by Mehrzad Marashi	Deutschland sucht den Superstar winner Season 8 (2011)	Succeeded by Luca Hänni
