= Abenteuer =

- The Deluxe Edition uses the same artwork.

Studio album by Andrea Berg
- Released: 30 September 2011
- Genre: Schlager
- Length: 49:55 (standard edition); 1:20:02 (Premium Edition)
- Language: German
- Label: Ariola
- Producer: Dieter Bohlen

Andrea Berg chronology
| Schwerelos (2010) | Abenteuer (2011) | Atlantis (2013) |

Alternative cover
- Abenteuer Premium Edition

Abenteuer (English: "Adventure") is the thirteenth studio album by German schlager singer Andrea Berg. It was released on 30 September 2011 in Germany and soon after in Austria and Switzerland. It marks Berg's second collaboration with Dieter Bohlen.

== Background ==
Like its predecessor Schwerelos (2010), Abenteuer was produced by Dieter Bohlen. The songs were composed by Bohlen, who provided Berg with the melodies for her to write lyrics. According to Berg, Abenteuer is the first album for which she wrote all the lyrics alone. In the booklet, the singer referred to the development phase of the album as a time "at which life was like shoes [made] of lead" and cites her father's death of cancer in April 2011 as one of the reasons. The song "Seelenverwandt" is dedicated to him. The album title, the German word for "adventure", represents Berg's wish to express that every day is a new chance and a first time.

== Track listing ==
All tracks on all editions are produced by Dieter Bohlen.

Abenteuer – Standard edition^{[a]}
| No. | Title | Writer(s) | Length |
|---|---|---|---|
| 1. | "Piraten wie wir" | Andrea Berg; Dieter Bohlen; Oliver Lukas | 4:07 |
| 2. | "Lebenslänglich" | Berg; Bohlen | 3:10 |
| 3. | "Flieg mit mir fort" | Berg; Bohlen; Lukas | 3:19 |
| 4. | "Herztattoo" | Berg; Bohlen | 3:28 |
| 5. | "Seelenverwandt" | Berg; Bohlen | 3:18 |
| 6. | "Ich schieß dich auf den Mond" | Berg; Bohlen | 3:50 |
| 7. | "Das kann kein Zufall sein^{[b]}" | Berg; Bohlen | 3:42 |
| 8. | "Lieber Gott" | Berg; Bohlen | 3:04 |
| 9. | "Dein Engel" | Berg; Bohlen | 3:18 |
| 10. | "Über alle sieben Meere" | Berg; Bohlen | 3:22 |
| 11. | "Einmal Himmel und zurück" | Berg; Bohlen; Lukas | 3:47 |
| 12. | "Brennendes Herz" | Berg; Bohlen | 3:30 |
| 13. | "Du bist gegangen" | Berg; Bohlen | 3:32 |
| 14. | "Ist es zu spät?" | Berg; Bohlen | 4:28 |
| Total length: | | | 49:55 |

Abenteuer – Premium Edition (bonus tracks)
| No. | Title | Writer(s) | Length |
|---|---|---|---|
| 15. | "Für immer und ewig" | Berg; Bohlen | 3:32 |
| 16. | "Ich lieb dich viel zu sehr" | Berg; Bohlen | 2:51 |
| 17. | "Atemlos" | Berg; Bohlen | 3:22 |
| 18. | "Wenn du da bist^{[c]}" (Piano Version) | Berg; Bohlen | 2:40 |
| Total length: | | | 1:02:20 |

Abenteuer – Premium Edition (CD 2)
| No. | Title | Writer(s) | Length |
|---|---|---|---|
| 1. | "Guten Abend, gute Nacht" | Johannes Brahms | 2:44 |
| 2. | "Weißt du wie viel Sternlein stehen?" | | 2:44 |
| 3. | "Guten Abend, gute Nacht" | Oskar Schima; Franz Xaver Kappus | 3:19 |
| 4. | "Still, still, still, weils Kindlein schlafen will" | | 2:30 |
| 5. | "La-Le-Lu" | Heino Gaze | 3:09 |
| 6. | "Aber Heidschi Bumbeidschi (Version 2011)" | | 3:16 |
| Total length: | | | 1:20:02 |

Abenteuer (DVD)^{[d]}
| No. | Title | Length |
|---|---|---|
| 1. | "Heimspiel – Impressionen vom Andrea Berg Open Air" |
| 2. | "Ein Blick hinter die Kulissen mit Höhepunkten vom Konzert und ganz privaten Momenten an einem besonderen Tag – Andrea Berg hautnah" |

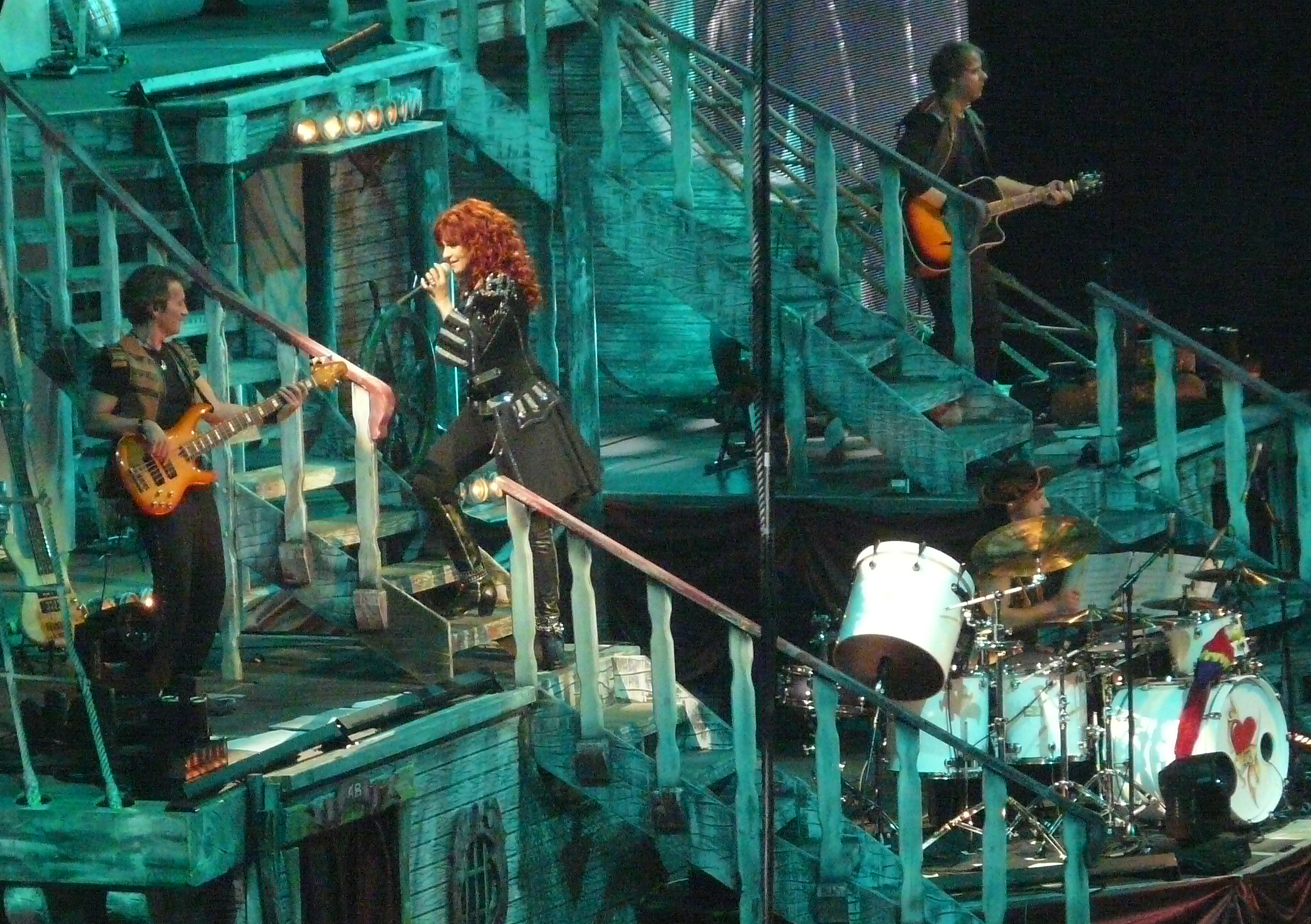
Andrea Berg performing in a pirate outfit live in Cologne as part of her Abenteuer-Tour in January 2012. Pirate and sea metaphors are very present on Abenteuer.

Notes

- ^{^a} According to hitparade.ch, there are several editions of Abenteuer with a different track 15: none, "Ich schieß dich auf den Mond (Foxtown-Mix)" (4:00) for the Mediamarkt Edition, "Lebenslänglich (Foxtown-Mix)" (3:00), or "Wenn du da bist"^{[c]} (3:45).
- ^{^b} "Das kann kein Zufall sein" (English: "That Cannot Be a Coincidence") uses the melody of "Call My Name", originally performed in 2011 by Deutschland sucht den Superstar winner Pietro Lombardi.
- ^{^c} "Wenn du da bist" (English: "When You Are Here") uses the melody of "It's All Over", originally performed in 1991 by Bohlen (as Blue System) with Dionne Warwick.
- ^{^d} The DVD is included both in the Deluxe Edition, which features the standard tracklist with 14 songs, and in the Premium Edition.

== Charts ==
=== Weekly charts ===
| Chart (2011) | Peak position |
|---|---|
| Austrian Albums (Ö3 Austria) | 1 |
| Belgian Albums (Ultratop Flanders) | 95 |
| Dutch Albums (Album Top 100) | 59 |
| German Albums (Offizielle Top 100) | 1 |
| Swiss Albums (Schweizer Hitparade) | 2 |

=== Year-end charts ===
| Chart (2011) | Position |
|---|---|
| Austrian Albums (Ö3 Austria) | 14 |
| German Albums (Offizielle Top 100) | 11 |
| Swiss Albums (Schweizer Hitparade) | 68 |

| Chart (2012) | Position |
|---|---|
| Austrian Albums (Ö3 Austria) | 41 |
| German Albums (Offizielle Top 100) | 23 |

| Chart (2013) | Position |
|---|---|
| German Albums (Offizielle Top 100) | 5 |
| Swiss Albums (Schweizer Hitparade) | 32 |

== See also ==
- List of number-one hits of 2011 (Germany)
- List of number-one hits of 2011 (Austria)
