= List of number-one popular hits of 2010 (Brazil) =

This is a list of number one popular singles on the Billboard Brasil Hot Popular chart in 2010. Note that Billboard publishes a monthly chart.

| Issue date | Song | Artist(s) |
|---|---|---|
| January | "Estrela Cadente" | Victor e Leo |
| February | "Na Base do Beijo" | Ivete Sangalo |
| March | "E Daí?" | Guilherme & Santiago |
| April | "Ao Vivo E Em Cores" | Victor e Leo |
| May | "Tapa na Cara" | Zezé Di Camargo e Luciano |
| June | "Tapa na Cara" | Zezé Di Camargo e Luciano |
| July | "Amo Noite e Dia" | Jorge & Matheus |
| August | "Amo Noite e Dia" | Jorge & Matheus |
| September | "Tá Vendo Aquela Lua" | Exaltasamba |
| October | "Adrenalina" | Luan Santana |
| November | "Adrenalina" | Luan Santana |
| December | "Adrenalina" | Luan Santana |

== See also ==
- Billboard Brasil
- List of Hot 100 number-one singles of 2010 (Brazil)
- List of number-one pop hits of 2010 (Brazil)
