= Atlantis (Andrea Berg album) =

- The Premium Edition uses the same artwork.

Studio album by Andrea Berg
- Released: 6 September 2013
- Genre: Schlager
- Length: 87:16 (standard edition); 125:40 (Geschenk-Edition)
- Language: German
- Label: Ariola
- Producer: Dieter Bohlen; Stefan Pössnicker; David Brandes; DJ BoBo; Achim Kleist; Wolfgang von Webenau

Andrea Berg chronology
Abenteuer (2011)	Atlantis (2013)	Seelenbeben (2016)

Alternative cover
- Atlantis Geschenk-Edition

Singles from Atlantis
- 1. "Das Gefühl" Released: August 12, 2013; 2. "Der letzte Tag im Paradies" Released: March 28, 2014; 3. "Himmel auf Erden" Released: 2014; 4. "Träumer wie wir" Released: February 27, 2015; 5. "Atlantis lebt"

Atlantis is the fourteenth studio album by German schlager singer Andrea Berg. It was released on 6 September 2013 in Germany, Austria, and Switzerland.

== Background and artwork ==
Atlantis is a double album. The first CD features songs composed and produced by Dieter Bohlen, who also worked on Andrea Berg's two previous albums Schwerelos (2010) and Abenteuer (2011), while the second CD includes contributions by various other songwriters and producers such as David Brandes and DJ BoBo.

According to Berg, the Atlantis theme was chosen as a continuation of her previous album Abenteuer, for which she used metaphors related to sea adventures and pirates. She also associates the island with freedom. The pictures used for the cover and booklet of Atlantis were taken by English underwater photographer Zena Holloway, who also worked with numerous other personalities such as Katie Price, singers Kylie Minogue and Rita Ora, or swimmer Jessica Hardy. Berg trained for four weeks to be able to hold her breath long enough for the photoshoot.

== Track listing ==
Atlantis (CD 1)
No.	Title	Length
1.	"Atlantis lebt"	3:39
2.	"Das Gefühl"	3:32
3.	"Davon geht die Welt nicht unter"	3:23
4.	"Der letzte Tag im Paradies"	3:07
5.	"Wir können nicht verlieren"	3:37
6.	"Liebe ist mehr"	3:00
7.	"Bin ich von allen guten Geistern verlassen?"	3:53
8.	"Ich will nicht länger davon träumen"	3:07
9.	"Unser bester Moment"	2:58
10.	"Wirst du mich lieben?"	3:28
11.	"Lass mich einfach weiter träumen"	3:26
12.	"Fliegst du immer noch so hoch?"	3:05
13.	"Träumer wie wir"	4:07

All tracks on the CD 1 are written by Andrea Berg and Dieter Bohlen and produced by Bohlen.

Atlantis (CD 2)
No.	Title	Writer(s)	Producer(s)	Length
1.	"Auf zu neuen Abenteuern"	Berg; René Bauman; Achim Kleist; Patrizia Kleist; Wolfgang von Webenau; Julia von Webenau	Bauman; A. Kleist; W. von Webenau	3:46
2.	"Vergessen und verzeihen"	Berg; David Brandes	Brandes	3:20
3.	"Himmel auf Erden"	Berg; Andreas Martin; Dr. Bernd Meinunger	Stefan Pössnicker	3:42
4.	"Vorübergehend nicht zu erreichen"	Berg; Bauman; A. Kleist; P. Kleist; W. von Webenau; J. von Webenau	Bauman; A. Kleist; W. von Webenau	3:20
5.	"Im nächsten Leben"	Berg; Bauman; A. Kleist; P. Kleist; W. von Webenau; J. von Webenau	Bauman; A. Kleist; W. von Webenau	3:54
6.	"Hallo"	Berg; Bauman; A. Kleist; P. Kleist; W. von Webenau; J. von Webenau	Bauman; A. Kleist; W. von Webenau	3:48
7.	"Du bist da"	Berg; Bauman; A. Kleist; P. Kleist; W. von Webenau; J. von Webenau	Bauman; A. Kleist; W. von Webenau	2:59
8.	"Weil du ein Zauberer bist"	Berg; Brandes	Brandes	3:33
9.	"Morgen werd ich gehn"	Berg; Brandes	Brandes	3:45
10.	"Dein Licht am Horizont"	Berg; Bauman; A. Kleist; P. Kleist; W. von Webenau; J. von Webenau	Bauman; A. Kleist; W. von Webenau	3:40
11.	"Nicht irgendwann"	Berg; Pössnicker	Pössnicker	3:14
12.	"Ich geh mit dir"	Berg; Brandes; Udo Brinkmann	Brandes	3:53
Total length:				1:27:16

Atlantis – Geschenk-Edition (CD 3)
No.	Title	Writer(s)	Length
1.	"Engel müssen fliegen"	Berg; Brandes	3:24
2.	"Meilenweit"	Berg; Brandes	3:49
3.	"Das kann kein Zufall sein^{[a]}" (Live 2013)	Berg; Bohlen	3:50
4.	"Ich schieß dich auf den Mond" (Live 2013)	Berg; Bohlen	4:22
5.	"Ich liebe das Leben" (Live 2013)	Klaus Munro; Leo Leandros	3:55
6.	"Kilimandscharo" (Live 2012)	Eugen Römer; Erich Offierowski	3:38
7.	"Einmal Himmel und zurück" (Live 2012)	Berg; Bohlen	3:55
8.	"Flieg mit mir fort" (Live 2013)	Berg; Bohlen; Oliver Lukas	3:26
9.	"Du hast mich tausendmal belogen" (Live 2012)	Berg; Römer; Irma Holder	4:10
10.	"Die Gefühle haben Schweigepflicht" (Live 2012)	Römer; Norbert Hammerschmidt	3:55
Total length:			2:05:40

Atlantis (DVD)^{[b]}
No.	Title	Length
1.	"Heimspiel 2013 Hinter den Kulissen"	20:00
2.	"Making Of Atlantis-Shooting"	10:00

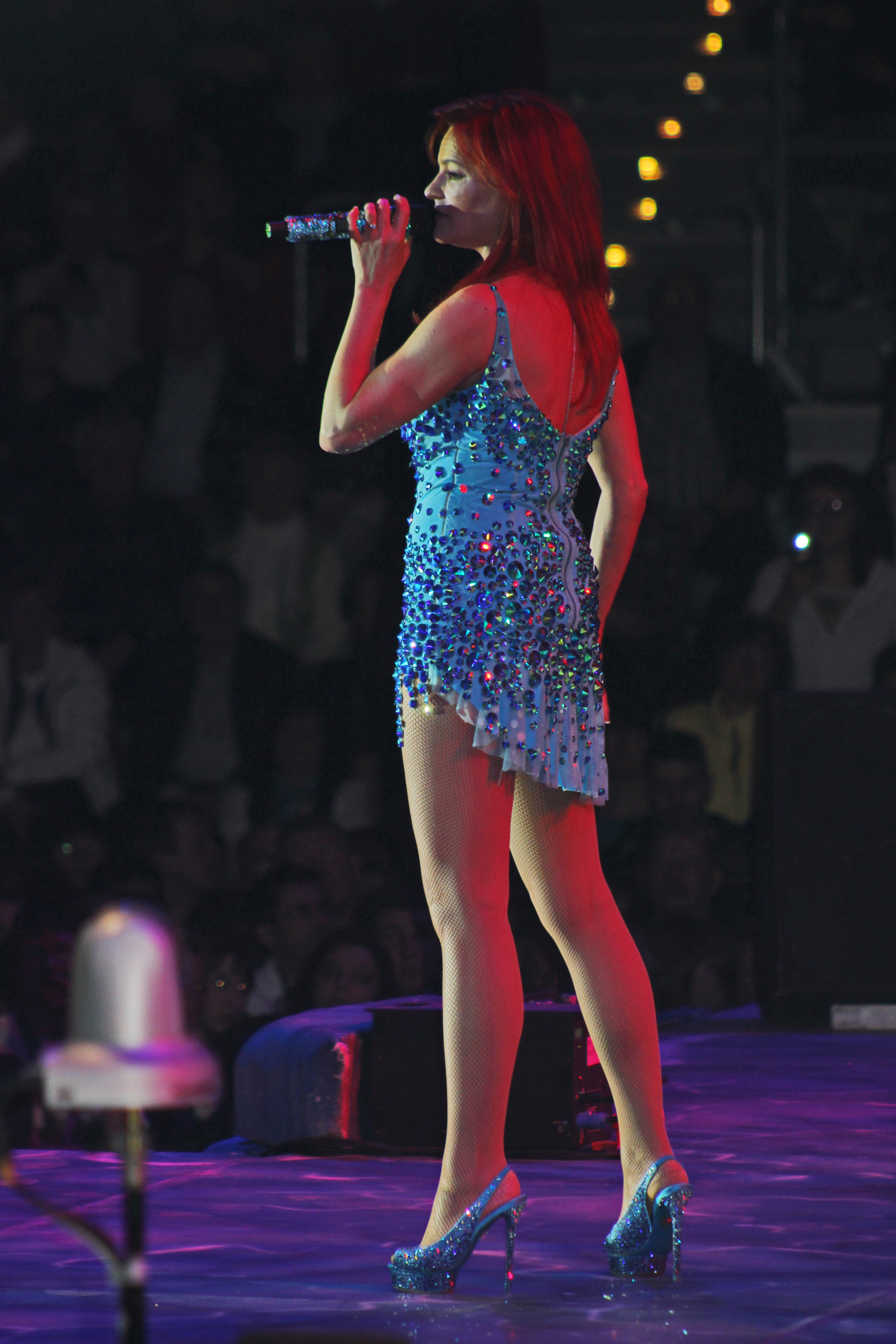
Andrea Berg performing live in Chemnitz as part of her Atlantis-Tour in February 2014. The tour yielded her first live album Atlantis – Andrea Berg Live das Heimspiel.

Notes

- ^{^a} "Das kann kein Zufall sein" (English: "That Cannot Be a Coincidence") uses the melody of "Call My Name", originally performed in 2011 by Deutschland sucht den Superstar winner Pietro Lombardi.
- ^{^b} The DVD is included both in the Premium Edition, which features the standard double album, and in the Geschenk-Edition.

== Charts ==
=== Weekly charts ===
Chart (2013–2014)	Peak position
Austrian Albums (Ö3 Austria)	1
Belgian Albums (Ultratop Flanders)	7
Danish Albums (Hitlisten)	5
Dutch Albums (Album Top 100)	27
German Albums (Offizielle Top 100)	1
Swiss Albums (Schweizer Hitparade)	1

=== Year-end charts ===
Chart (2013)	Position
Austrian Albums (Ö3 Austria)	1
German Albums (Offizielle Top 100)	3
Swiss Albums (Schweizer Hitparade)	21

Chart (2014)	Position
Austrian Albums (Ö3 Austria)	18
German Albums (Offizielle Top 100)	50

== See also ==
- List of number-one hits of 2013 (Germany)
- List of number-one hits of 2013 (Austria)
- List of number-one hits of 2013 (Switzerland)
