= List of number-one popular hits of 2009 (Brazil) =

This is a list of number-one popular singles on the Billboard Brasil Hot Popular chart in 2009. Note that Billboard publishes a monthly chart. The first number-one single on the chart was "Amor Não Vai Faltar" by Bruno e Marrone.

== Chart history ==
Issue date	Song	Artist(s)
October	Amor Não Vai Faltar	Bruno e Marrone
November	Amor Não Vai Faltar	Bruno e Marrone
December	Amor Não Vai Faltar	Bruno e Marrone

== See also ==
- List of Hot 100 number-one singles of 2009 (Brazil)
- List of number-one popular hits of 2010 (Brazil)
