= List of number-one hits of 2010 (Austria) =

This is a list of the Austrian number-one singles & albums of 2010.

Issue date	Song	Artist	Album	Artist
1 January	No Top 40 released			
8 January	"Bad Romance"	Lady Gaga	The Fame Monster	Lady Gaga
15 January	"Bad Romance"	Lady Gaga	Neujahrskonzert 2010	Vienna Philharmonic / Georges Prêtre
22 January	"Tik Tok"	Kesha	Neujahrskonzert 2010	Vienna Philharmonic / Georges Prêtre
29 January	"Tik Tok"	Kesha	Neujahrskonzert 2010	Vienna Philharmonic / Georges Prêtre
5 February	"Tik Tok"	Kesha	Hope for Haiti Now	Various Artists
12 February	"Tik Tok"	Kesha	Wer wenn nicht du	Marc Pircher
19 February	"Tik Tok"	Kesha	Neue Helden braucht das Land	Erste Allgemeine Verunsicherung
26 February	"Tik Tok"	Kesha	Neue Helden braucht das Land	Erste Allgemeine Verunsicherung
5 March	"Tik Tok"	Kesha	Zeiten ändern dich	Bushido
12 March	"Tik Tok"	Kesha	American VI: Ain't No Grave	Johnny Cash
19 March	"Tik Tok"	Kesha	Plastic Beach	Gorillaz
26 March	"Alors on danse"	Stromae	A Curious Thing	Amy Macdonald
2 April	"Alors on danse"	Stromae	A Curious Thing	Amy Macdonald
9 April	"Alors on danse"	Stromae	A Curious Thing	Amy Macdonald
16 April	"Alors on danse"	Stromae	A Curious Thing	Amy Macdonald
23 April	"Alors on danse"	Stromae	Slash	Slash
30 April	"Don't Believe"	Mehrzad Marashi	Iron Man 2 (Soundtrack)	AC/DC
7 May	"Don't Believe"	Mehrzad Marashi	Iron Man 2 (Soundtrack)	AC/DC
14 May	"Don't Believe"	Mehrzad Marashi	Iron Man 2 (Soundtrack)	AC/DC
21 May	"Don't Believe"	Mehrzad Marashi	Iron Man 2 (Soundtrack)	AC/DC
28 May	"Wavin' Flag"	K'naan	Iron Man 2 (Soundtrack)	AC/DC
4 June	"Wavin' Flag"	K'naan	Iron Man 2 (Soundtrack)	AC/DC
11 June	"Wavin' Flag"	K'naan	My Cassette Player	Lena
18 June	"Wavin' Flag"	K'naan	The Twilight Saga: Eclipse (Soundtrack)	
25 June	"Waka Waka (This Time for Africa)"	Shakira featuring Freshlyground	Best Of	Helene Fischer
2 July	"Waka Waka (This Time for Africa)"	Shakira featuring Freshlyground	Recovery	Eminem
9 July	"Waka Waka (This Time for Africa)"	Shakira featuring Freshlyground	Recovery	Eminem
16 July	"Waka Waka (This Time for Africa)"	Shakira featuring Freshlyground	Wohlfühlgefühl	Seer
23 July	"Waka Waka (This Time for Africa)"	Shakira featuring Freshlyground	Wohlfühlgefühl	Seer
30 July	"Waka Waka (This Time for Africa)"	Shakira featuring Freshlyground	The Twilight Saga: Eclipse (Soundtrack)	
6 August	"We No Speak Americano"	Yolanda Be Cool & DCUP	Weißt du, was du für mich bist?	Amigos
13 August	"We No Speak Americano"	Yolanda Be Cool & DCUP	Weißt du, was du für mich bist?	Amigos
20 August	"We No Speak Americano"	Yolanda Be Cool & DCUP	Recovery	Eminem
27 August	"We No Speak Americano"	Yolanda Be Cool & DCUP	The Final Frontier	Iron Maiden
3 September	"We No Speak Americano"	Yolanda Be Cool & DCUP	Ich hab dich einfach lieb	Hansi Hinterseer
10 September	"We No Speak Americano"	Yolanda Be Cool & DCUP	Bring mich nach Hause	Wir sind Helden
17 September	"We No Speak Americano"	Yolanda Be Cool & DCUP	Teenage Dream	Katy Perry
24 September	"Love the Way You Lie"	Eminem featuring Rihanna	A Thousand Suns	Linkin Park
1 October	"Love the Way You Lie"	Eminem featuring Rihanna	A Thousand Suns	Linkin Park
8 October	"Love the Way You Lie"	Eminem featuring Rihanna	Meine Zeit	Rainhard Fendrich
15 October	"Love the Way You Lie"	Eminem featuring Rihanna	Meine Zeit	Rainhard Fendrich
22 October	"Love the Way You Lie"	Eminem featuring Rihanna	In and Out of Consciousness: The Greatest Hits 1990–2010	Robbie Williams
29 October	"Only Girl (In the World)"	Rihanna	Come Around Sundown	Kings of Leon
5 November	"Only Girl (In the World)"	Rihanna	Schwerelos	Andrea Berg
12 November	"Oida Taunz!"	Trackshittaz	Kiddy Contest Vol. 16	
19 November	"Only Girl (In the World)"	Rihanna	Schwerelos	Andrea Berg
26 November	"Just the Way You Are"	Bruno Mars	Kiddy Contest Vol. 16	
3 December	"Barbra Streisand"	Duck Sauce	Kiddy Contest Vol. 16	
10 December	"The Time (Dirty Bit)"	The Black Eyed Peas	Kiddy Contest Vol. 16	
17 December	"The Time (Dirty Bit)"	The Black Eyed Peas	Kiddy Contest Vol. 16	
24 December	"The Time (Dirty Bit)"	The Black Eyed Peas	Michael	Michael Jackson
31 December	No Top 40 released			
