= List of number-one hits of 2011 (Germany) =

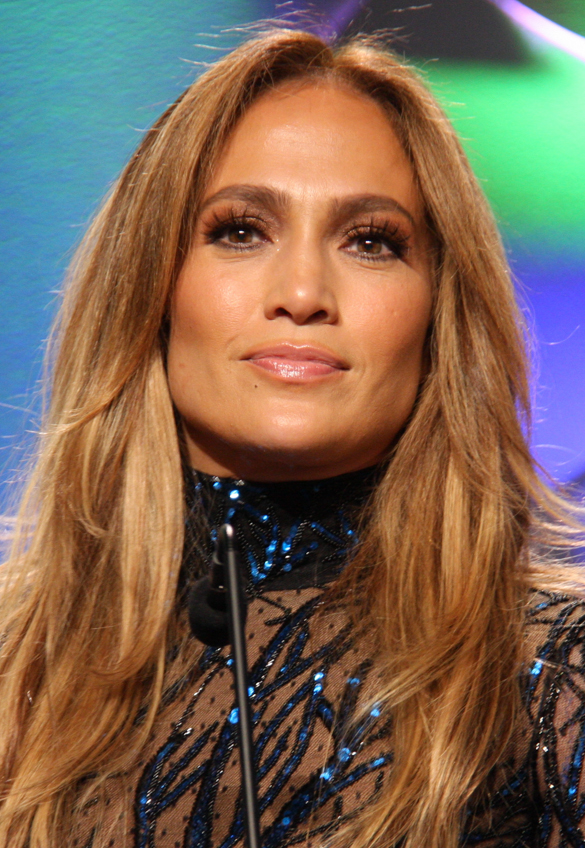
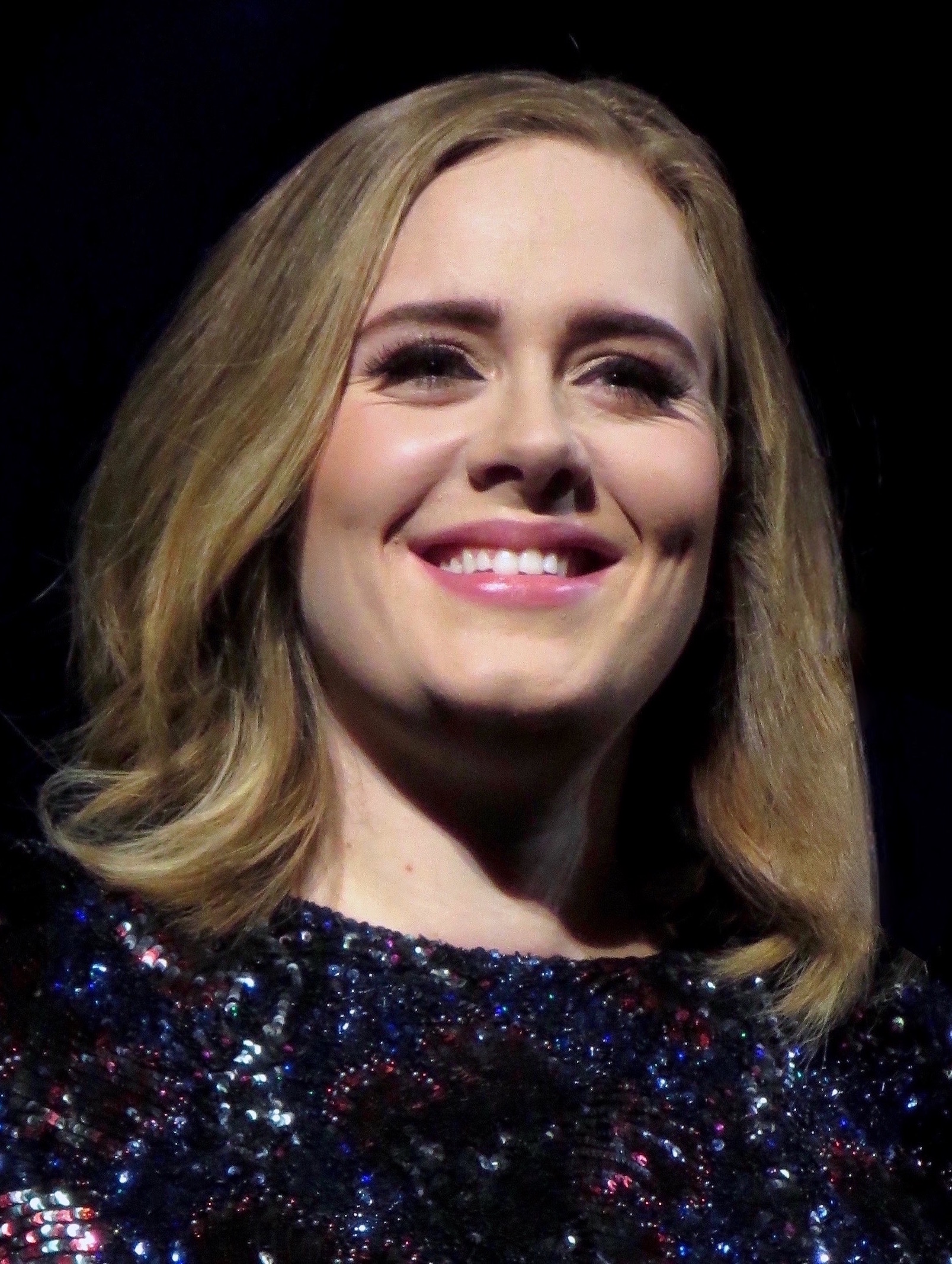
Jennifer Lopez's "On the Floor" became the best-performing single of 2011, while Adele's "21" became the best-performing album of the year.

The Media Control charts are record charts compiled by Media Control on behalf of the German record industry. They include the "Single Top 100" and the "Album Top 100" chart. The chart week runs from Friday to Thursday, and the chart compilations are published on Tuesday for the record industry. The entire top 100 singles and top 100 albums are officially released the following Friday by Media Control. The charts are based on sales of physical singles and albums from retail outlets as well as permanent music downloads.

== Number-one hits by week ==
Key
†	Indicates best-performing single and album of 2011

Issue date	Single	Artist	Ref.
7 January	"The Time (Dirty Bit)"	The Black Eyed Peas	
14 January	"The Time (Dirty Bit)"	The Black Eyed Peas	
21 January	"The Time (Dirty Bit)"	The Black Eyed Peas	
28 January	"The Time (Dirty Bit)"	The Black Eyed Peas	
4 February	"Rolling in the Deep"	Adele	
11 February	"Rolling in the Deep"	Adele	
18 February	"Grenade"	Bruno Mars	
25 February	"Grenade"	Bruno Mars	
4 March	"Grenade"	Bruno Mars	
11 March	"Grenade"	Bruno Mars	
18 March	"Born This Way"	Lady Gaga	
25 March	"Born This Way"	Lady Gaga	
1 April	"Grenade"	Bruno Mars	
8 April	"Grenade"	Bruno Mars	
15 April	"On the Floor"†	Jennifer Lopez (featuring Pitbull)	
22 April	"On the Floor"†	Jennifer Lopez (featuring Pitbull)	
29 April	"On the Floor"†	Jennifer Lopez (featuring Pitbull)	
6 May	"On the Floor"†	Jennifer Lopez (featuring Pitbull)	
13 May	"On the Floor"†	Jennifer Lopez (featuring Pitbull)	
20 May	"Call My Name"	Pietro Lombardi	
27 May	"Call My Name"	Pietro Lombardi	
3 June	"Call My Name"	Pietro Lombardi	
10 June	"Call My Name"	Pietro Lombardi	
17 June	"Party Rock Anthem"	LMFAO (featuring Lauren Bennett and GoonRock)	
24 June	"Party Rock Anthem"	LMFAO (featuring Lauren Bennett and GoonRock)	
1 July	"On the Floor" †	Jennifer Lopez (featuring Pitbull)	
8 July	"Mr. Saxobeat"	Alexandra Stan	
15 July	"Mr. Saxobeat"	Alexandra Stan	
22 July	"Mr. Saxobeat"	Alexandra Stan	
29 July	"Mr. Saxobeat"	Alexandra Stan	
5 August	"Mr. Saxobeat"	Alexandra Stan	
12 August	"Mr. Saxobeat"	Alexandra Stan	
19 August	"Mr. Saxobeat"	Alexandra Stan	
26 August	"Danza Kuduro"	Lucenzo (featuring Don Omar)	
2 September	"New Age"	Marlon Roudette	
9 September	"New Age"	Marlon Roudette	
16 September	"New Age"	Marlon Roudette	
23 September	"New Age"	Marlon Roudette	
30 September	"New Age"	Marlon Roudette	
7 October	"New Age"	Marlon Roudette	
14 October	"New Age"	Marlon Roudette	
21 October	"New Age"	Marlon Roudette	
28 October	"We Found Love"	Rihanna (featuring Calvin Harris)	
4 November	"Geronimo"	Aura Dione	
11 November	"We Found Love"	Rihanna (featuring Calvin Harris)	
18 November	"We Found Love"	Rihanna (featuring Calvin Harris)	
25 November	"Good Feeling"	Flo Rida	
2 December	"We Found Love"	Rihanna (featuring Calvin Harris)	
9 December	"Video Games"	Lana Del Rey	
16 December	"Video Games"	Lana Del Rey	
23 December	"Video Games"	Lana Del Rey	
30 December	"Somebody That I Used to Know"	Gotye (featuring Kimbra)	

Issue date	Album	Artist	Ref.
7 January	Große Freiheit	Unheilig	
14 January	Große Freiheit	Unheilig	
21 January	Große Freiheit	Unheilig	
28 January	Doo-Wops & Hooligans	Bruno Mars	
4 February	21†	Adele	
11 February	Boombox	Beatsteaks	
18 February	Good News	Lena Meyer-Landrut	
25 February	Charm School	Roxette	
4 March	Good News	Lena Meyer-Landrut	
11 March	Sterneneisen	In Extremo	
18 March	Collapse into Now	R.E.M.	
25 March	Endgame	Rise Against	
1 April	Schiffsverkehr	Herbert Grönemeyer	
8 April	Schiffsverkehr	Herbert Grönemeyer	
15 April	Bel Air	Guano Apes	
22 April	Wasting Light	Foo Fighters	
29 April	Schiffsverkehr	Herbert Grönemeyer	
6 May	21†	Adele	
13 May	21†	Adele	
20 May	Live at River Plate	AC/DC	
27 May	Jenseits von gut und böse	Bushido	
3 June	Born This Way	Lady Gaga	
10 June	Jackpot	Pietro Lombardi	
17 June	Jackpot	Pietro Lombardi	
24 June	Jackpot	Pietro Lombardi	
1 July	Sounds of a Playground Fading	In Flames	
8 July	Gold Cobra	Limp Bizkit	
15 July	Gold Cobra	Limp Bizkit	
22 July	XOXO	Casper	
29 July	21†	Adele	
5 August	Mein Himmel auf Erden	Die Amigos	
12 August	SchwarzWeiss	Samy Deluxe	
19 August	Back to Black	Amy Winehouse	
26 August	21†	Adele	
2 September	Black and White America	Lenny Kravitz	
9 September	I'm with You	Red Hot Chili Peppers	
16 September	I'm with You	Red Hot Chili Peppers	
23 September	Nothing but the Beat	David Guetta	
30 September	MTV Unplugged – Live aus dem Hotel Atlantic	Udo Lindenberg	
7 October	Wir sind am Leben	Rosenstolz	
14 October	Abenteuer	Andrea Berg	
21 October	Tabaluga und die Zeichen der Zeit	Peter Maffay	
28 October	Für einen Tag	Helene Fischer	
4 November	Mylo Xyloto	Coldplay	
11 November	MTV Unplugged – Live aus dem Hotel Atlantic	Udo Lindenberg	
18 November	MTV Unplugged – Live aus dem Hotel Atlantic	Udo Lindenberg	
25 November	Aura	Kool Savas	
2 December	MTV Unplugged – Live aus dem Hotel Atlantic	Udo Lindenberg	
9 December	MTV Unplugged – Live aus dem Hotel Atlantic	Udo Lindenberg	
16 December	Made in Germany: 1995–2011	Rammstein	
23 December	MTV Unplugged – Live aus dem Hotel Atlantic	Udo Lindenberg	
30 December	MTV Unplugged – Live aus dem Hotel Atlantic	Udo Lindenberg	

== Sources ==
- http://www.germancharts.de/

== See also ==
- List of number-one hits (Germany)
- List of number-one hits of 2010 (Germany)
- List of German airplay number-one songs
