= List of number-one hits of 2011 (Austria) =

This is a list of the Austrian number-one singles & albums of 2011.

Issue date	Song	Artist	Album	Artist
7 January	"The Time (Dirty Bit)"	The Black Eyed Peas	Große Freiheit	Unheilig
14 January	"The Time (Dirty Bit)"	The Black Eyed Peas	Große Freiheit	Unheilig
21 January	"The Time (Dirty Bit)"	The Black Eyed Peas	Neujahrskonzert 2011	Vienna Philharmonic / Franz Welser-Möst
28 January	"Guuugarutz"	Trackshittaz	Neujahrskonzert 2011	Vienna Philharmonic / Franz Welser-Möst
4 February	"Hello"	Martin Solveig & Dragonette	21	Adele
11 February	"Should Have Let You Love Me"	Cornelia Mooswalder	Schwerelos	Andrea Berg
18 February	"Hello"	Martin Solveig & Dragonette	Oidaah pumpn muas's	Trackshittaz
25 February	"Hello"	Martin Solveig & Dragonette	Oidaah pumpn muas's	Trackshittaz
4 March	"Hello"	Martin Solveig & Dragonette	Oidaah pumpn muas's	Trackshittaz
11 March	"Hello"	Martin Solveig & Dragonette	Seine größten Erfolge und mehr	Peter Alexander
18 March	″Born This Way″	Lady Gaga	Seine größten Erfolge und mehr	Peter Alexander
25 March	″Born This Way″	Lady Gaga	Seine größten Erfolge und mehr	Peter Alexander
1 April	″Born This Way″	Lady Gaga	Schiffsverkehr	Herbert Grönemeyer
8 April	″Born This Way″	Lady Gaga	Schiffsverkehr	Herbert Grönemeyer
15 April	"On the Floor"	Jennifer Lopez featuring Pitbull	Schiffsverkehr	Herbert Grönemeyer
22 April	"A Night like This"	Caro Emerald	Wasting Light	Foo Fighters
29 April	"On the Floor"	Jennifer Lopez featuring Pitbull	Bobmusik – das Gelbe Album	SpongeBob Schwammkopf
6 May	"Sweat"	Snoop Dogg vs. David Guetta	Star on the Horizon	Cornelia Mooswalder
13 May	"Sweat"	Snoop Dogg vs. David Guetta	Let Them Talk	Hugh Laurie
20 May	"Call My Name"	Pietro Lombardi	Der Junge mit der Luftgitarre	Nik P.
27 May	"Call My Name"	Pietro Lombardi	Jenseits von gut und böse	Bushido
3 June	"Call My Name"	Pietro Lombardi	Born This Way	Lady Gaga
10 June	"Call My Name"	Pietro Lombardi	Jackpot	Pietro Lombardi
17 June	"Party Rock Anthem"	LMFAO featuring Lauren Bennett & GoonRock	Jackpot	Pietro Lombardi
24 June	"Mr. Saxobeat"	Alexandra Stan	Jackpot	Pietro Lombardi
1 July	"Mr. Saxobeat"	Alexandra Stan	Jackpot	Pietro Lombardi
8 July	"Mr. Saxobeat"	Alexandra Stan	Il Volo	Il Volo
15 July	"Mr. Saxobeat"	Alexandra Stan	Prolettn feian längaah	Trackshittaz
22 July	"Mr. Saxobeat"	Alexandra Stan	Prolettn feian längaah	Trackshittaz
29 July	"Mr. Saxobeat"	Alexandra Stan	Zieh dich an und geh	Nockalm Quintett
5 August	"Mr. Saxobeat"	Alexandra Stan	Mein Himmel auf Erden	Amigos
12 August	"Danza Kuduro"	Lucenzo featuring Don Omar	Back to Black	Amy Winehouse
19 August	"Danza Kuduro"	Lucenzo featuring Don Omar	Back to Black	Amy Winehouse
26 August	"Danza Kuduro"	Lucenzo featuring Don Omar	Die Superstars der Klassik	Erwin Schrott, Anna Netrebko & Jonas Kaufmann
2 September	"Danza Kuduro"	Lucenzo featuring Don Omar	Herzwerk	Andreas Gabalier
9 September	"Loca People"	Sak Noel	Nothing but the Beat	David Guetta
16 September	"Loca People"	Sak Noel	Nothing but the Beat	David Guetta
23 September	"Moves Like Jagger"	Maroon 5 featuring Christina Aguilera	Nothing but the Beat	David Guetta
30 September	"I Won't Let You Go"	James Morrison	SuperHeavy	SuperHeavy
7 October	"New Age"	Marlon Roudette	Wir sind am Leben	Rosenstolz
14 October	"Brenna tuats guat"	Hubert von Goisern	Abenteuer	Andrea Berg
21 October	"Brenna tuats guat"	Hubert von Goisern	Abenteuer	Andrea Berg
28 October	"Brenna tuats guat"	Hubert von Goisern	Volks-Rock'n'Roller	Andreas Gabalier
4 November	"Brenna tuats guat"	Hubert von Goisern	Volks-Rock'n'Roller	Andreas Gabalier
11 November	"Brenna tuats guat"	Hubert von Goisern	Volks-Rock'n'Roller	Andreas Gabalier
18 November	"Geronimo"	Aura Dione	Volks-Rock'n'Roller	Andreas Gabalier
25 November	"Good Feeling"	Flo Rida	Volks-Rock'n'Roller	Andreas Gabalier
2 December	"Hangover"	Taio Cruz featuring Flo Rida	Talk That Talk	Rihanna
9 December	"Hangover"	Taio Cruz featuring Flo Rida	Kiddy Contest Vol. 17	
16 December	"Hangover"	Taio Cruz featuring Flo Rida	Lioness: Hidden Treasures	Amy Winehouse
23 December	"Hangover"	Taio Cruz featuring Flo Rida	Christmas	Michael Bublé
30 December	No Top 40 released			
