= Olaf Henning =

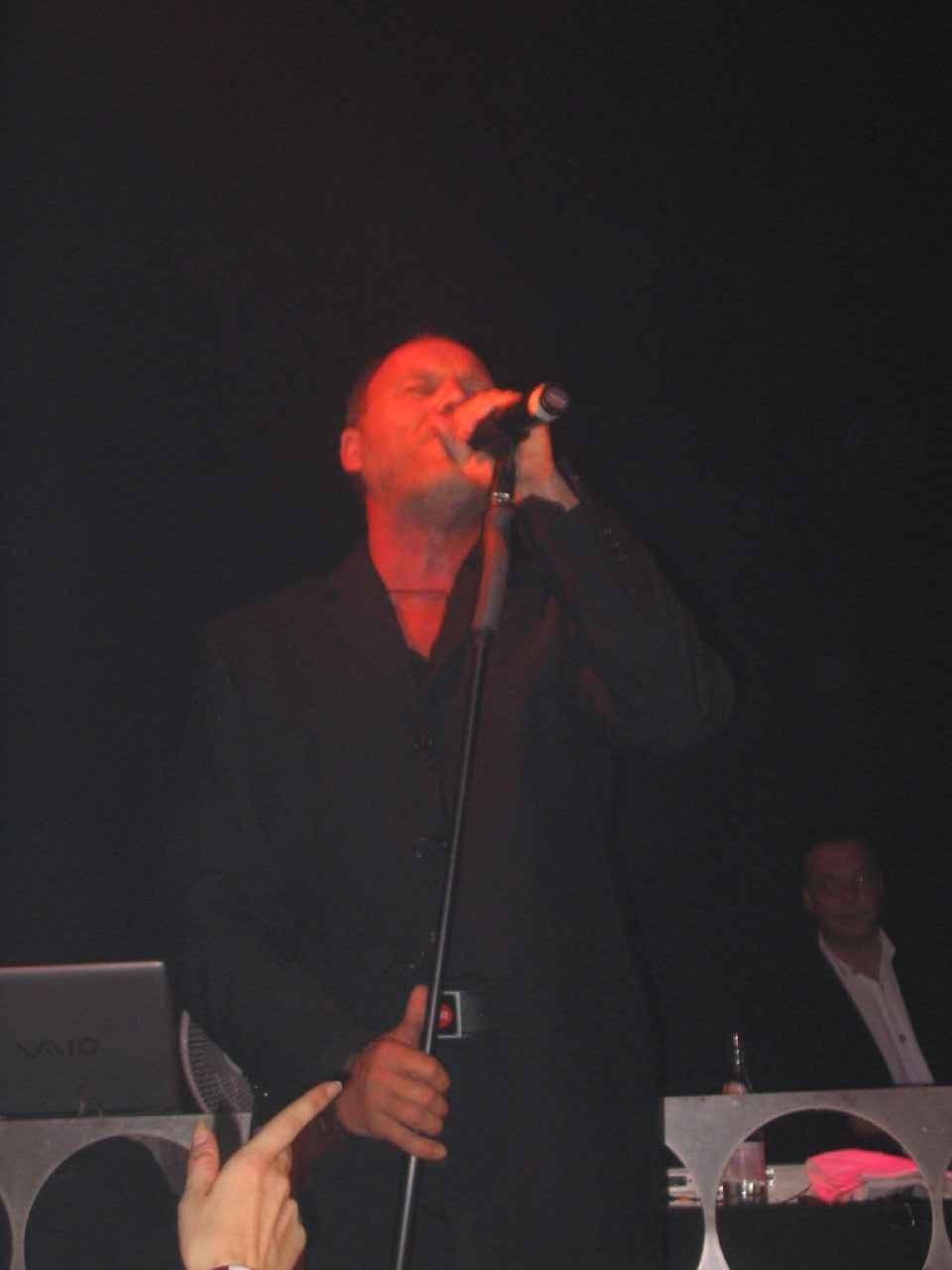
- Olaf Henning at Cologne Pride 2006

Background information
- Born: Olaf Henning; March 14, 1968 (age 58); Bonn, Germany
- Origin: Gelsenkirchen, Germany
- Genres: Schlager, Pop
- Occupation: Singer
- Years active: 1994–present
- Labels: Ariola, H.A.R.D. Records

Olaf Henning (born March 14, 1968) is a German composer and pop singer.

== Discography ==
=== Albums ===
- 1999 – Die Manege ist leer
- 1999 – Das Party-Album
- 2000 – Alarmstufe Rot
- 2000 – Schöne Bescherung
- 2001 – Das Party-Album 2.0
- 2002 – Olaf Henning / Freunde 2002
- 2003 – Best of Olaf Henning
- 2004 – Echt Henning
- 2004 – Partyalbum 3
- 2005 – Total verboten
- 2005 – Klingelton Album Olaf Henning
- 2007 - Alles erlaubt
- 2008 - Das Beste für Cowboys und Indianer

=== Singles ===
- 1998 – Der Clown (Die Manege ist leer)
- 1998 – Herzdame
- 1999 – Blinder Passagier
- 1999 – Echt Kacke
- 2000 – Das Spiel ist aus
- 2000 – Cowboy und Indianer
- 2001 – Alarmstufe Rot (Der Remix)
- 2001 – Maddalena 2001 (Du Luder)
- 2001 – Merry Christmas
- 2002 – Solange wir leben
- 2003 – Wieder mal verliebt
- 2003 – Endlich zuhause
- 2003 – Im Zweifel für den Angeklagten
- 2003 – Wieder mal verliebt
- 2004 – Schick mir die Rechnung
- 2004 – Cowboy und Indianer 2004
- 2004 – Ich will nach hause zu Mama
- 2005 – Cowboy und Indianer 2005
- 2005 – Traumprinz
- 2006 – Cowboy und Indianer 2006
- 2007 – Für heute für morgen für immer
- 2008 – Cowboy und Indianer (Hit Version 2008)

== See also ==
- Native Americans in German popular culture
- List of downloadable songs for the SingStar series
