= List of Hot 100 number-one singles of 2010 (Brazil) =

This is a list of number one singles on the Billboard Brasil Hot 100 chart in 2010. Billboard publishes a monthly chart.

== Chart history ==
Issue date	Song	Artist(s)
January	"I Want to Know What Love Is"	Mariah Carey
February	"I Want to Know What Love Is"	Mariah Carey
March	"I Want to Know What Love Is"	Mariah Carey
April	"I Want to Know What Love Is"	Mariah Carey
May	"I Want to Know What Love Is"	Mariah Carey
June	"Tapa na Cara"	Zezé Di Camargo e Luciano
July	"Tapa na Cara"	Zezé Di Camargo e Luciano
August	"Amo Noite e Dia"	Jorge & Mateus
September	"Amo Noite e Dia"	Jorge & Mateus
October	"Tá Vendo Aquela Lua"	Exaltasamba
November	"Adrenalina"	Luan Santana
December	"Adrenalina"	Luan Santana

== See also ==
- Billboard Brasil
- List of number-one pop hits of 2010 (Brazil)
