= The Time (Dirty Bit) =

2010 single by the Black Eyed Peas

Single by the Black Eyed Peas

from the album The Beginning
- Released: November 3, 2010
- Recorded: 2009–2010
- Studio: Glenwood Place Studios (Burbank, CA)
- Genre: Dutch house; EDM; dance-pop
- Length: 5:08 (album version); 4:15 (radio edit)
- Label: Interscope
- Songwriters: William Adams; Allan Pineda; Damien LeRoy; Franke Previte; John DeNicola; Donald Markowitz
- Producers: will.i.am; DJ Ammo

The Black Eyed Peas singles chronology
"Rock That Body" (2010)	"The Time (Dirty Bit)" (2010)	"Just Can't Get Enough" (2011)

Music video
- "The Time (Dirty Bit)" on YouTube

"The Time (Dirty Bit)" is a song by American musical group the Black Eyed Peas from their sixth studio album, The Beginning. It was written by group members will.i.am and apl.de.ap along with DJ Ammo, who produced the song with will.i.am. Additionally, Franke Previte, John DeNicola and Donald Markowitz received co-writing credits since the chorus interpolates 1987's Dirty Dancing soundtrack "(I've Had) The Time of My Life", performed by Bill Medley and Jennifer Warnes.

The song received generally mixed reviews from critics, who praised its catchiness but criticized the sample use, Auto-Tune and lyrics. It peaked at number four on the Billboard Hot 100 in the US, becoming the group's sixth consecutive top ten hit (following the five singles from their previous album, The E.N.D.), and ninth overall. It topped the charts in Australia, Austria, Belgium, Canada, France, Germany, Hungary, Italy, Spain, New Zealand, and the United Kingdom, while also charting inside the top ten of the charts in most European countries. Worldwide, it was the eighth best-selling digital single of 2011 with sales of 7.3 million copies.

== Background and composition ==
After will.i.am tweeted: "Who wants me to drop the new Black Eyed Peas single from The Beginning earlier than we should???", he posted the song on Dipdive. Group member Fergie noted the song's coincidental relation to Dirty Dancing actress Jennifer Grey's appearance on Dancing with the Stars: "... that song reminds me of [Grey] and Dirty Dancing and that whole time".

The chorus of "The Time (Dirty Bit)" interpolates "(I've Had) The Time of My Life", originally performed by Bill Medley and Jennifer Warnes in the 1987 film Dirty Dancing. In the chorus, the line "Yes I swear it's the truth" was changed to "And I swear this is true". Billboard described the song as continuing the group's "evolution from hip-pop to dance heavyweights as will.i.am and Fergie sing and rap over a beat tailored to global dancefloors."

== Reception ==
=== Critical response ===
Simon Vozick-Levinson of Entertainment Weekly praised the song's catchiness, but felt it failed to meet the standards of previous singles "Boom Boom Pow" and "I Gotta Feeling". Franke Previte, who won an Academy Award for co-writing "(I've Had) The Time of My Life", complimented the Black Eyed Peas' sample usage, saying, "It just reconfirms to me that the song is cross-generational. The song has now crossed over to the next generation in a huge way." Willa Paskin of New York, however, criticized the choice of sample and was disappointed with the chorus, feeling it was "shoehorned into the rest of the song". Todd Martens of the Los Angeles Times called "The Time (Dirty Bit)" "the most assertive party song of the year". Digital Spy's Nick Levine gave a review of three stars out of five, disliking the many elements that constituted the song. The Independent's Simon Price also criticized the sampling on the track, calling it a low quality attempt to satisfy listeners.

=== Comparisons to Deadmau5 ===
After receiving Twitter messages about the song's similarity to his own work, Canadian record producer Deadmau5 compared the song to the remix of "You and I" by Medina, a song he produced. The record producer spoke of the similarities through his official Facebook account. "I so know that hi-hat... and the pattern it was in... so I went to my masters folder, cracked open my instrumental mix of 'You and I' remix thing I did for Medina... and there it was again, staring me in the face". The producer stated he welcomed the usage of sampling in electronic music, "This isn't calling the Black Eyed Peas out at all. This is just another interesting factoid I keep finding about sampling and electronic music".

=== Commercial performance ===
"The Time (The Dirty Bit)" debuted on the Canadian Hot 100 at number 87 the week of November 5, 2010. The song also debuted at number 40 on the Billboard Mainstream Top 40 chart the next week and has currently peaked at number 19. Two weeks later, the song climbed to number one in Canada, the third time the group has achieved this, selling 31,000 downloads that week. The song also peaked at number one for two weeks in a row in New Zealand, becoming their sixth number one and 12th top 10 single in the country. While the song debuted at number ten in Australia, it reached number one in its second week. On the singles chart for Ireland and the Netherlands the song has peaked at number two.

In the United Kingdom, "The Time (Dirty Bit)" climbed five places on the UK Singles Chart from its previous highest peak of number six to number one on December 12, 2010 ― for the week ending date December 18, 2010 ― beating "Whip My Hair" by Willow Smith to the summit of the chart. The song became the group's fifth chart-topping song in Britain, following 2003's "Where Is the Love?" and 2009's "Boom Boom Pow", "I Gotta Feeling", and "Meet Me Halfway". It also debuted at number one on the UK Dance Chart.

In Germany, the song debuted at number seven on the German Singles Chart and reached number two in its third week, where it stayed for three consecutive weeks. In its sixth week on that chart, it finally reached number one, breaking the 12-week run of Israel Kamakawiwo'ole's "Somewhere Over the Rainbow/What a Wonderful World". In February 2011, the single was certificated Platinum in Germany for 300,000 copies sold, making it their third single to do so (following "Shut Up" and "I Gotta Feeling"). After 4 weeks at the top, the song went down to No. 4, making it the biggest fall from the pole position since Mehrzad Marashi did so with his single "Don't Believe" in May 2010.

As of July 2011, the single has sold 3 million copies in the US, making it the group's fourth to do so.

== Music video ==
A cubic projection of Fergie materializing in place of will.i.am's head in the music video for "The Time (Dirty Bit)".

The music video for "The Time (Dirty Bit)" was released on October 11, 2010, and was directed by Rich Lee, who earlier directed the video for "Imma Be"/"Rock That Body", Pasha Shapiro, and Ernst Weber. It opens with a zoom-in to a city street where, as will.i.am sings the beginning, his head voxelizes and transforms into a television screen where Fergie is projected during her solo. The video then cuts to sweaty dancers at an underground nightclub, who, along with the Peas, also variously become voxelized throughout the song. The avatars seen on the cover of the new album The Beginning appear as posters, and the BlackBerry PlayBook also appears as pre-release product placement, seen animating them in an augmented reality application and making special effects. The animated versions of the band members are in this order: will.i.am, Fergie, apl.de.ap, and Taboo. As of August 2020, the video has received over 485 million views on YouTube.

== Live performances ==
The Black Eyed Peas performed "The Time (Dirty Bit)" at the American Music Awards of 2010 on November 21. Each member wore a futuristic outfit and started off enclosed in a glow-in-the-dark yellow box chamber similar to an elevator, accompanied by dancers with boxes as heads. Martens gave it grade of C+, calling it the "oddest set of the night". During the performance, Fergie experienced some trouble when the door to her box remained stuck for a moment. On December 5, the group performed the single live during the semi-final results of season 7 of the British TV singing competition The X Factor. They also performed "The Time (Dirty Bit)" in the Super Bowl XLV halftime show, and then again at the "i.am.FIRST" performance at the FIRST Robotics Competition World Championship on April 29, 2011.

For the first time in over 9 years, the Black Eyed Peas performed this song once again during the latter part of the closing ceremony of the 2019 Southeast Asian Games, with recent member J. Rey Soul in place of Fergie.

== Track listing ==
- Digital download
1. "The Time (Dirty Bit)" – 5:08
- CD single
1. "The Time (Dirty Bit)" (Radio edit) – 4:15
2. "The Time (Dirty Bit)" (Main mix) – 5:08
- The Time (Dirty Bit): Re-Pixelated – Digital Remix E.P.
1. "The Time (Dirty Bit)" (Afrojack remix) – 7:53
2. "The Time (Dirty Bit)" (Zedd remix) – 6:00
3. "The Time (Dirty Bit)" (Dave Audé club mix) – 7:16
4. "The Time (Dirty Bit)" (Felguk remix) – 5:18
5. "The Time (Dirty Bit)" (Wideboys full club remix) – 5:23
- Digital single
1. "The Time (Dirty Bit)" (Video edit) – 4:52
2. "The Time (Dirty Bit)" (Edson Pride vocal edit) – 8:15

== Credits and personnel ==
Vocals – will.i.am, apl.de.ap, Fergie, Taboo

== Charts ==
=== Weekly charts ===
Weekly chart performance
Chart (2010–2011)	Peak position
Australia (ARIA)	1
Austria (Ö3 Austria Top 40)	1
Belgium (Ultratop 50 Flanders)	1
Belgium (Ultratop 50 Wallonia)	1
Brazil (Billboard Hot 100 Airplay)	1
Canada Hot 100 (Billboard)	1
CIS Airplay (TopHit)	7
Czech Republic Airplay (ČNS IFPI)	1
Denmark (Tracklisten)	5
European Hot 100 Singles (Billboard)	4
Finland (Suomen virallinen lista)	2
France (SNEP)	2
Germany (GfK)	1
Hungary (Dance Top 40)	1
Hungary (Editors' Choice Top 40)	1
Ireland (IRMA)	2
Israel International Airplay (Media Forest)	1
Italy (FIMI)	1
Italy Airplay (EarOne)	40
Japan Hot 100 (Billboard)	8
Luxembourg Digital Songs (Billboard)	1
Mexico (Monitor Latino)	2
Mexico Anglo (Monitor Latino)	1
Netherlands (Dutch Top 40)	4
Netherlands (Single Top 100)	2
New Zealand (Recorded Music NZ)	1
Norway (VG-lista)	7
Peru (UNIMPRO)	1
Poland Dance (ZPAV)	3
Portugal Digital Song Sales (Billboard)	1
Romania (Romanian Top 100)	91
Russia Airplay (TopHit)	7
Scottish Singles Sales (Official Charts)	1
Slovakia Airplay (ČNS IFPI)	1
South Korea International Singles (Downloads) (Gaon)	172
Spain (Promusicae)	1
Sweden (Sverigetopplistan)	9
Switzerland (Schweizer Hitparade)	1
Ukraine Airplay (TopHit)	52
UK Dance (Official Charts)	1
UK Singles (Official Charts)	1
US Billboard Hot 100	4
US Dance Club Songs (Billboard)	5
US Dance Airplay (Billboard)	7
US Hot Latin Songs (Billboard)	22
US Pop Airplay (Billboard)	8
US Rhythmic Airplay (Billboard)	16

=== Year-end charts ===
2010 year-end chart performance
Chart (2010)	Position
Australia (ARIA)	28
Austria (Ö3 Austria Top 40)	43
Belgium (Ultratop 50 Flanders)	37
Belgium (Ultratop 50 Wallonia)	8
Brazil (Crowley)	67
France (SNEP)	13
Germany (Media Control AG)	21
Hungary (Dance Top 40)	77
Italy (FIMI)	56
Netherlands (Dutch Top 40)	91
Netherlands (Single Top 100)	64
New Zealand (Recorded Music NZ)	30
Spain (PROMUSICAE)	47
Sweden (Sverigetopplistan)	46
Switzerland (Schweizer Hitparade)	49
UK Singles (OCC)	26

2011 year-end chart performance
Chart (2011)	Position
Australia (ARIA)	70
Austria (Ö3 Austria Top 40)	9
Belgium (Ultratop 50 Flanders)	22
Belgium (Ultratop 50 Wallonia)	15
Brazil (Crowley)	20
Canada (Canadian Hot 100)	15
France (SNEP)	17
Germany (Official German Charts)	36
Italy (Musica e dischi)	58
Netherlands (Dutch Top 40)	56
Netherlands (Single Top 100)	63
Russia Airplay (TopHit)	13
Spain (PROMUSICAE)	14
Sweden (Sverigetopplistan)	74
Switzerland (Schweizer Hitparade)	18
Ukraine Airplay (TopHit)	167
UK Singles (OCC)	110
US Billboard Hot 100	37
US Dance/Mix Show Airplay (Billboard)	41
US Hot Latin Songs (Billboard)	75

2012 year-end chart performance
Chart (2012)	Position
Russia Airplay (TopHit)	200

== Certifications ==
Region	Certification	Certified units/sales
Australia (ARIA)	3× Platinum	210,000^{^}
Belgium (BRMA)	Platinum	30,000^{*}
Brazil (Pro-Música Brasil)	2× Diamond	500,000^{‡}
Denmark (IFPI Danmark)	Gold	15,000^{^}
France (SNEP)	Platinum	250,000^{*}
Germany (BVMI)	3× Gold	450,000^{‡}
Italy (FIMI)	Platinum	30,000^{*}
Japan (RIAJ)	Gold	100,000^{*}
New Zealand (RMNZ)	2× Platinum	30,000^{*}
Spain (Promusicae)	Platinum	40,000^{*}
Sweden (GLF)	3× Platinum	120,000^{‡}
Switzerland (IFPI Switzerland)	2× Platinum	60,000^{^}
United Kingdom (BPI)	Platinum	600,000^{^}
^{*} Sales figures based on certification alone.^{^} Shipments figures based on certification alone.^{‡} Sales+streaming figures based on certification alone.

== Release history ==
Release dates and formats
Region	Date	Format	Label	Ref.
Italy	November 3, 2010	Radio airplay	Universal	
United States	November 9, 2010	Digital download	Interscope	
United States	November 16, 2010	Contemporary hit radio; rhythmic contemporary radio	Interscope	
Germany	November 19, 2010	CD	Universal	
France	January 17, 2011	CD	Polydor	

== See also ==
- List of Canadian Hot 100 number-one singles of 2010
- List of number-one hits of 2010 (Austria)
- List of number-one hits of 2011 (Germany)
- List of number-one hits of 2010 (Italy)
- List of number-one pop hits of 2010 (Brazil)
- List of number-one singles of 2010 (Australia)
- List of number-one singles of 2010 (France)
- List of UK Dance Singles Chart number ones of 2010
- List of UK Dance Singles Chart number ones of 2011
- List of UK Singles Chart number ones of the 2010s
- List of Ultratop 50 number-one singles of 2010
