= Schwerelos =

Studio album by Andrea Berg
- Released: 22 October 2010
- Genre: Schlager
- Length: 53:15 (standard edition); 1:15:36 (Tour Edition)
- Language: German
- Label: Ariola
- Producer: Dieter Bohlen; Erich Öxler; Stefan Pössnicker

Andrea Berg chronology
Zwischen Himmel & Erde (2009)	Schwerelos (2010)	Abenteuer (2011)

Alternative cover
- Schwerelos Tour Edition

Schwerelos (English: "Weightless") is the twelfth studio album by German schlager singer Andrea Berg. It was released on 22 October 2010 in Germany and soon after in Austria and Switzerland. According to its certifications, the album has sold over one million copies.

== Background ==
In early 2010, Andrea Berg and her longtime producer Eugen Römer announced the end of their collaboration. According to Römer, he was having health problems and had decided to put off working with Berg for an undetermined amount of time. At her label's request, Dieter Bohlen was chosen to produce the album. Initially, Berg was sceptical about this choice, but met with Bohlen in Mallorca following her husband's advice. She was convinced by the song "Ich liebe dich" (English: "I Love You"), which was written by Bohlen and which he had presented to her during their meeting. She said: "When I heard it, I thought to myself: 'Someone who can compose such a song and who writes such lyrics has exactly the emotionality I need'." According to Berg, the switch to Bohlen radicalised her style a little bit, but Schwerelos is still a typical Andrea Berg album. Bohlen composed the songs and provided Berg with some lyric fragments that she used to write the final lyrics.

== Track listing ==
Schwerelos – Standard edition
No.	Title	Writer(s)	Producer(s)	Length
1.	"Du kannst noch nicht mal richtig lügen"	Andrea Berg; Dieter Bohlen; Oliver Lukas	Bohlen	3:42
2.	"Ich liebe das Leben"	Klaus Munro; Leo Leandros	Erich Öxler; Stefan Pössnicker	3:48
3.	"Schwerelos"	Berg; Bohlen	Bohlen	3:29
4.	"Ich werde wieder tanzen geh'n"	Bohlen; Dr. Bernd Meinunger	Bohlen	3:57
5.	"Zum Teufel mit der Einsamkeit"	Berg; Bohlen	Bohlen	3:29
6.	"Ich liebe dich"	Bohlen	Bohlen	3:37
7.	"Sag mir doch"	Berg; Bohlen	Bohlen	3:38
8.	"Endlich Du"	Berg; Bohlen	Bohlen	3:15
9.	"Schenk mir einen Stern"	Berg; Bohlen	Bohlen	3:41
10.	"Nein!"	Berg; Bohlen	Bohlen	4:04
11.	"Halt mein Herz in der Hand"	Berg; Bohlen	Bohlen	3:48
12.	"Ich halt die Erde an"	Andreas Bärtels	Bohlen	4:01
13.	"Wer einmal lügt"	Berg; Bohlen	Bohlen	3:31
14.	"Diese Träne"	Berg; Bohlen; Lukas	Bohlen	4:15
Total length:				53:15

Schwerelos – Tour Edition (bonus tracks)
No.	Title	Writer(s)	Producer(s)	Length
15.	"Seemann, deine Heimat ist das Meer"	Werner Scharfenberger; Fini Busch	Öxler; Pössnicker	3:49
16.	"Mein Prinz"	Öxler; Pössnicker	Öxler; Pössnicker	3:05
17.	"Ich hab dich im Gefühl"	Thomas Rosenfeld	Bohlen	3:33
18.	"Schwerelos-Hitmix"			4:36
19.	"Du kannst noch nicht mal richtig lügen" (Hüttenmix)			3:30
20.	"Ich liebe das Leben" (Tanzcafé-Mix)			3:48
Total length:				1:15:36

Schwerelos – Tour Edition (DVD)
No.	Title	Length
1.	"Music Was My First Love (Live Summer Open Air 2010)"	5:46
Total length:		1:17:34

== Charts ==
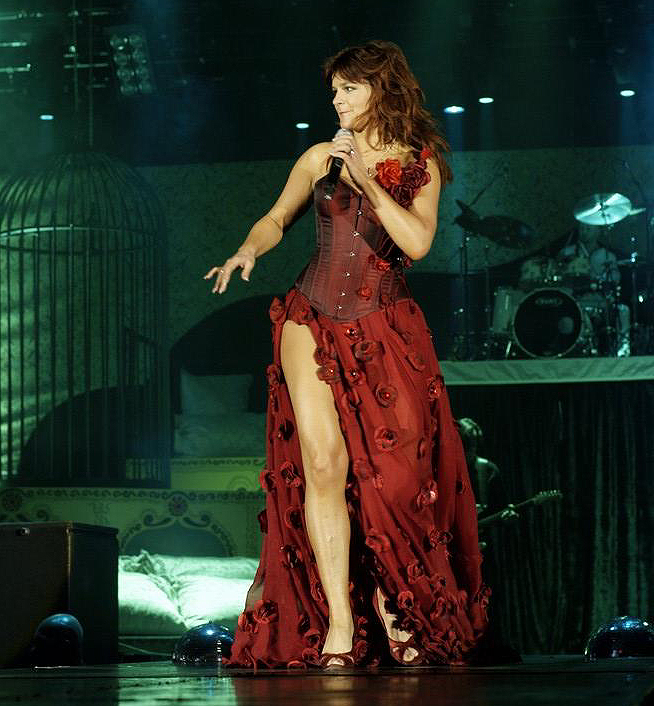
Andrea Berg performing live in Oberhausen as part of her Schwerelos-Tour in February 2011.

Chart	Peak position
Belgian Albums (Ultratop Flanders)	103
German Albums (Offizielle Top 100)	1
Austrian Albums (Ö3 Austria)	1
Swiss Albums (Schweizer Hitparade)	9

== Certifications ==
- Platinum in 2011 for 60,000 units in Austria
- Gold in 2011 for 15,000 in Switzerland
- Platinum in 2012 for 1,000,000 units in Germany

== See also ==
- List of number-one hits of 2010 (Germany)
- List of number-one hits of 2010 (Austria)
