= List of number-one pop hits of 2010 (Brazil) =

This is a list of number one pop singles on the Billboard Brasil Hot Pop chart in 2009.

== Chart history ==
Chart date	Song	Artist
January	"I Want to Know What Love Is"	Mariah Carey
February	"I Want to Know What Love Is"	Mariah Carey
March	"I Want to Know What Love Is"	Mariah Carey
April	"I Want to Know What Love Is"	Mariah Carey
May	"I Want to Know What Love Is"	Mariah Carey
June	"Baby"	Justin Bieber featuring Ludacris
July	"Alejandro"	Lady Gaga
August	"Alejandro"	Lady Gaga
September	"Alejandro"	Lady Gaga
October	"Alejandro"	Lady Gaga
November	"Do Lado de Cá"	Chimarruts
December	"The Time (Dirty Bit)"	The Black Eyed Peas

== See also ==
- Billboard Brasil
- List of Hot 100 number-one singles of 2010 (Brazil)
- Crowley Broadcast Analysis
