= Andrea Berg =

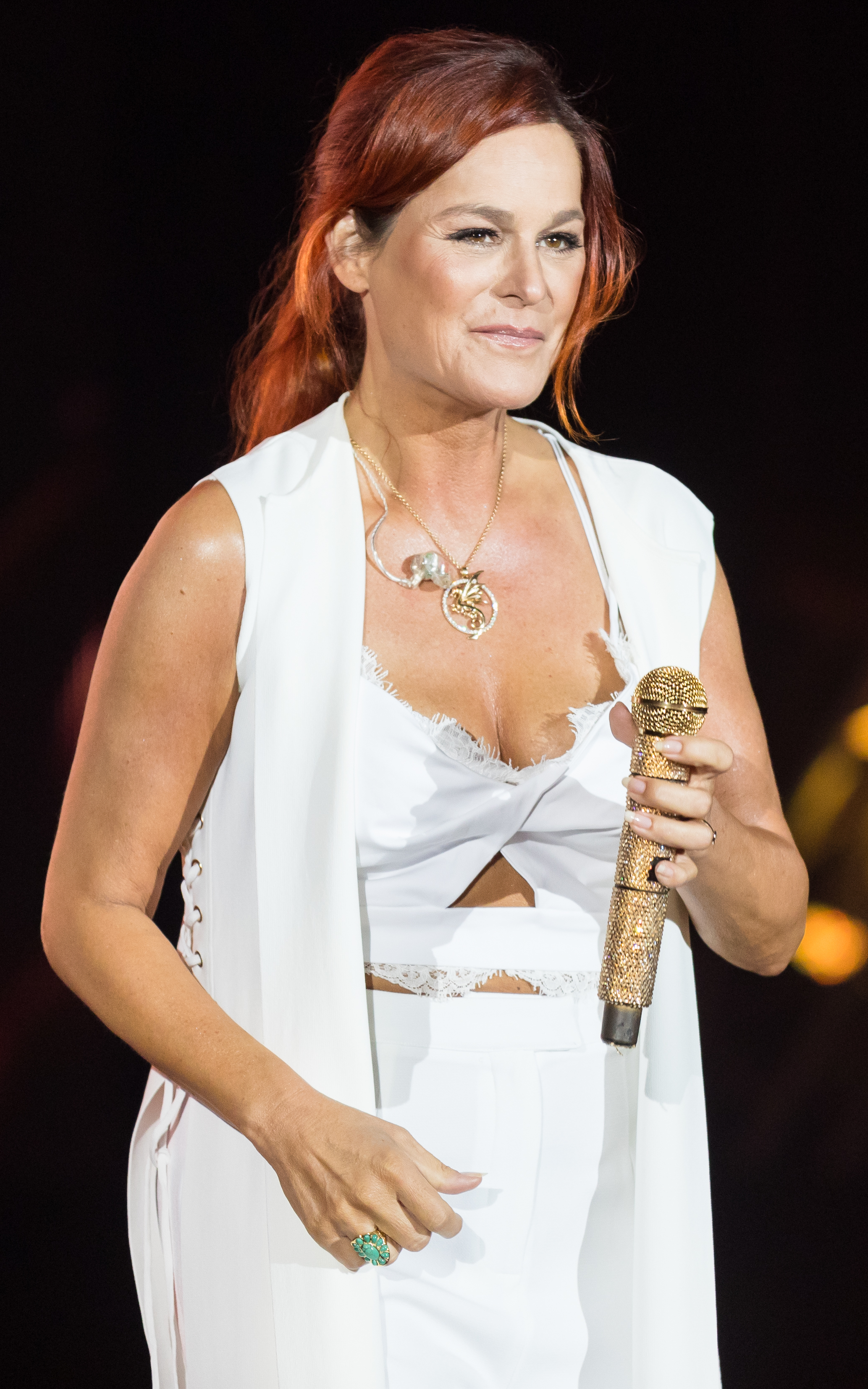
- Berg at the Schlagernacht des Jahres 2017
- Born: Andrea Zellen; 28 January 1966 (age 60); Krefeld, West Germany
- Occupation: Singer
- Years active: 1992–present
- Spouses: Olaf Henning (m. 2002; div. 2004) Ulrich Ferber (m. 2007)
- Musical career
- Genre: Schlager
- Labels: White; Jupiter; BMG
- Website: andrea-berg.de

Andrea Ferber (née Zellen; born 28 January 1966), known professionally as Andrea Berg, is a German schlager singer. She performed at carnivals as a child and began her career in 1992 after being discovered by record producer Eugen Römer. While she released her first studio album Du bist frei that same year, her commercial breakthrough took place with its follow-up Gefühle, released in 1995. The collaboration between Berg and Römer spawned a string of commercially successful albums, with her albums Machtlos (2003), Du (2004), Splitternackt (2006), and Zwischen Himmel & Erde (2009) topping the German charts. Her compilation album Best Of, released in 2001, is the album that spent the most weeks on the charts in Germany and Austria. Between 2010 and 2018, Berg worked with Dieter Bohlen, who produced her albums Schwerelos (2010), Abenteuer (2011), Atlantis (2013), and Seelenbeben (2016), all of which topped the German and Austrian album charts.

Berg has received several awards, including six ECHO Awards and eight Goldene Stimmgabeln. With over 10 million records sold throughout her career, she is one of the best-selling music artists in Germany.

== Life and career ==
=== 1966–1996: Early life and career beginnings ===
Andrea Berg was born in Krefeld. As a child, she would experiment with performing short sketches at carnivals and other celebrations. She later played with a band, and also worked backstage on stage set-up and drove the band's van. During this time, she supported herself working as a nurse in the intensive care and oncology departments of a hospital. Her musical career began in 1992 after producer Eugen Römer obtained a cassette with recordings of hers. He was enthused by her voice, and within a week the first tracks had been recorded for her début studio album Du bist frei ("You Are Free"), which contained the singles "Kilimandscharo" ("Kilimandjaro") and "Schau mir noch mal ins Gesicht" ("Look Me in the Face Once Again"). Römer also produced her second studio album Gefühle ("Feelings"), which proved her commercial breakthrough. The singles from the album, "Wenn du mich willst, dann küß mich doch" ("If You Want Me, Then Kiss Me") and "Einmal nur mit dir alleine sein", were hits. The album also featured one of her most popular songs, "Die Gefühle haben Schweigepflicht". In 1994, she reached the first place of the ZDF-Hitparade with the song "Steig wieder auf", recorded as part of group Alle für Alle.

=== 1997–2009: Further commercial success ===
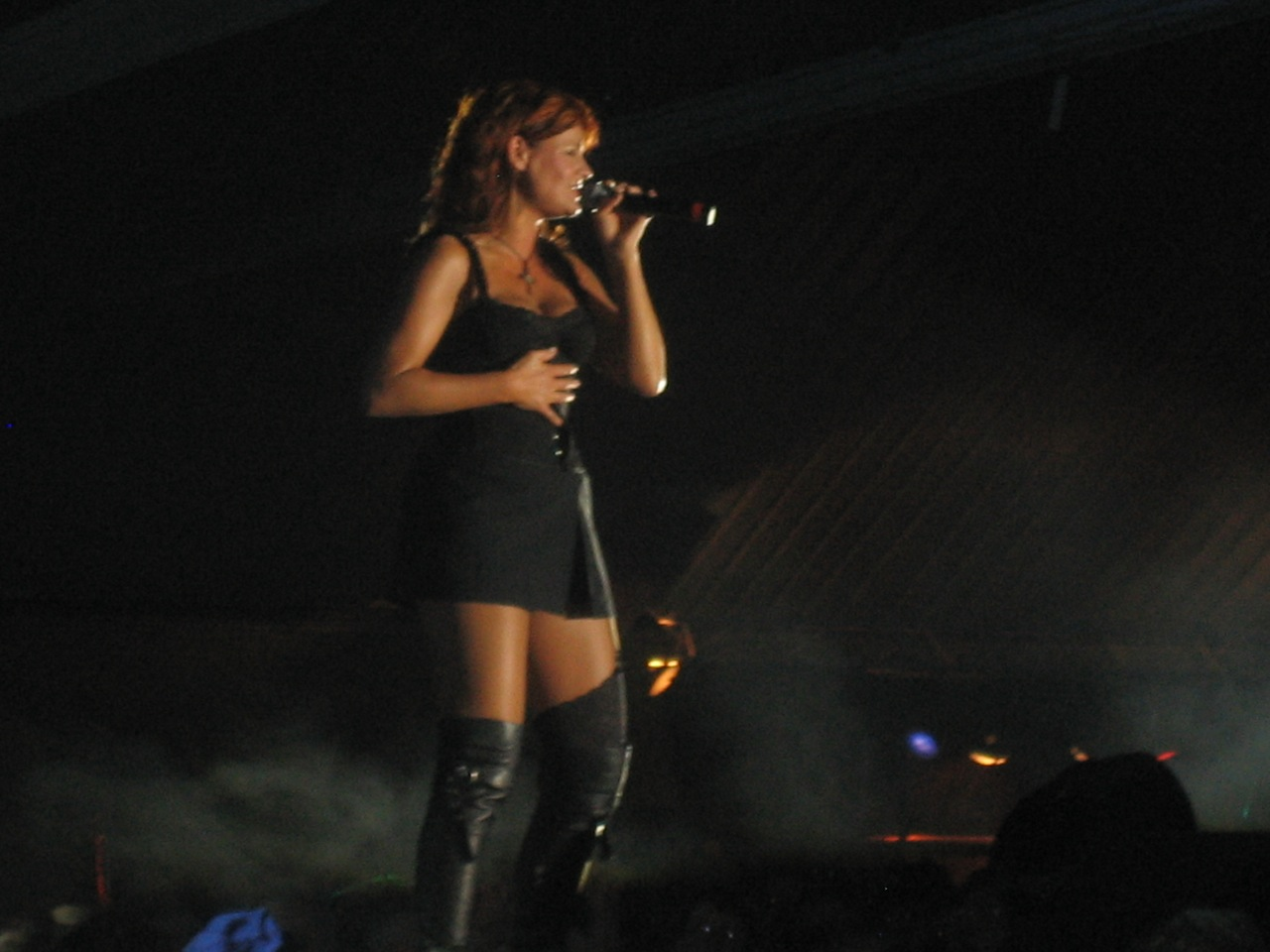
Berg performing in Salzwedel in September 2007

In 1997, Berg released her third studio album Träume lügen nicht ("Dreams Don't Lie"), which reached place 71 of the German album charts. The first single, "Warum nur träumen" ("Why Just Dream"), was a number-one on some radio playlists and stayed in the charts for 15 weeks. Following the birth of her daughter, she released her fourth album Zwischen tausend Gefühlen ("Between a Thousand Feelings") in 1998, which contains twelve songs. Three singles were released from the album throughout 1999: "Diese Nacht soll nie enden" ("This Night Should Never End"), "Insel der Nacht" ("Island of the Night"), and "Jenseits der Zärtlichkeit" ("Beyond Tenderness"). That same year, she released her fifth album Weil ich verliebt bin ("Because I'm in Love"), of which the single "Vielleicht ein Traum zu viel" reached the third place of the ZDF-Hitparade. She also reached the third place of Hits des Jahres ("Hits of the Year") in January 2000 and was number-one for several weeks in the German Top 20 airplay charts. Since 18 October 2000, "Andrea Berg" has been a registered trademark in Germany.

In October 2001, Berg released the compilation Best Of, which features twelve of her most successful songs. The album sold two million copies and went double-platinum in 2003. As of 2012, it was seven-times-platinum. In August 2011, Best Of reached place 59 of the Swiss hit-parade and was certified gold. Best Of is the album that spent the most weeks on the German and Austrian album charts. Berg has sometimes had as many as four releases in the German charts simultaneously. Her 2002 studio album Nah am Feuer ("Close to the Fire") went gold in 2003. Her 2006 album Splitternackt ("Butt-Naked") reached number-one on the German album charts, where it remained for several weeks. Her single "Du hast mich tausendmal belogen" ("You Have Lied to Me a Thousand Times"), originally published on her album Wo liegt das Paradies, reached the second place of the GEMA Top 10 of collected international sales in 2007.

=== 2010–present: Collaboration with Dieter Bohlen ===
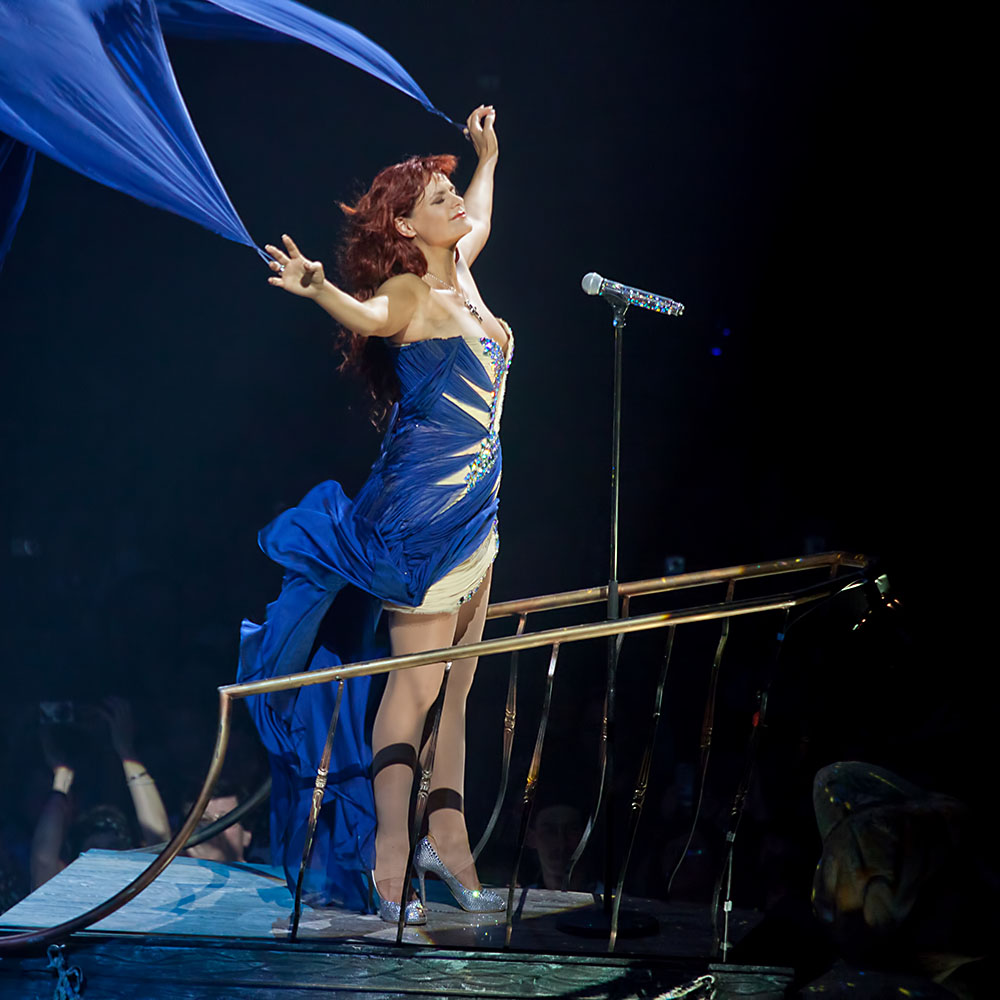
Berg performing in Leipzig in March 2012

In October 2010, Berg released the album Schwerelos ("Weightless"), which was produced by Dieter Bohlen and thus ended her 17-year-long collaboration with Eugen Römer. The album went platinum after six days and topped the German and Austrian album charts. With its follow-up Abenteuer ("Adventure"), released in September 2011 and also produced by Bohlen, Berg reached place one in Germany and Austria for the third time in a row. From January to March 2012, she went on an anniversary tour to celebrate her twentieth career anniversary.

In April 2013, Berg was a guest juror on an episode of Deutschland sucht den Superstar, the German version of Pop Idol and American Idol. In June, she released the compilation album My Danish Collection exclusively in Denmark, where it went gold in its first week and reached the top of the Danish album charts in its second week, marking Berg's first time in the Danish charts. In September 2013, Berg released the double album Atlantis. The first CD was produced by Bohlen, while the second one contains songs by various other producers. Atlantis topped the German, Austrian, and Swiss album charts.

In April 2016, Berg released the album Seelenbeben ("Soul Tremors"), which marks her fourth collaboration with Bohlen and also topped the German, Austrian, and Swiss album charts. It received gold and platinum certifications. At the preview of her tour for Seelenbeben at the Rittal Arena Wetzlar, Berg received burns on her shoulder and upper arm following a pyrotechnics accident. To celebrate her 25th career anniversary, she released the compilation 25 Jahre Abenteuer Leben. On 17 March 2018, Bohlen informed Berg per email that he was ending their professional relationship and would not produce her future albums. Despite that, on 3 April 2019, Berg and Bohlen announced they would publish two new songs together.

== Personal life ==
Berg has a daughter, Lena-Marie, born in 1998. From 2002 to 2004, Berg was married to schlager singer Olaf Henning. In 2007, she married sports agent, hotelier, and SG Sonnenhof Großaspach co-founder Ulrich Ferber. As of September 2013, they were living together with Berg's daughter in Aspach.

== Public image and accolades ==
From 2002 to 2007, Berg won the Goldene Stimmgabel every year, as well as the Amadeus Austrian Music Award for best schlager album in 2004 and 2005. She also won several ECHOs between 2003 and 2011. On 3 November 2008, she was awarded the Federal Cross of Merit by President of Germany Horst Köhler for her hospice work during a ceremony at the Bellevue Palace. On 15 June 2009, she was awarded the seal of her birth city of Krefeld for her social commitment.

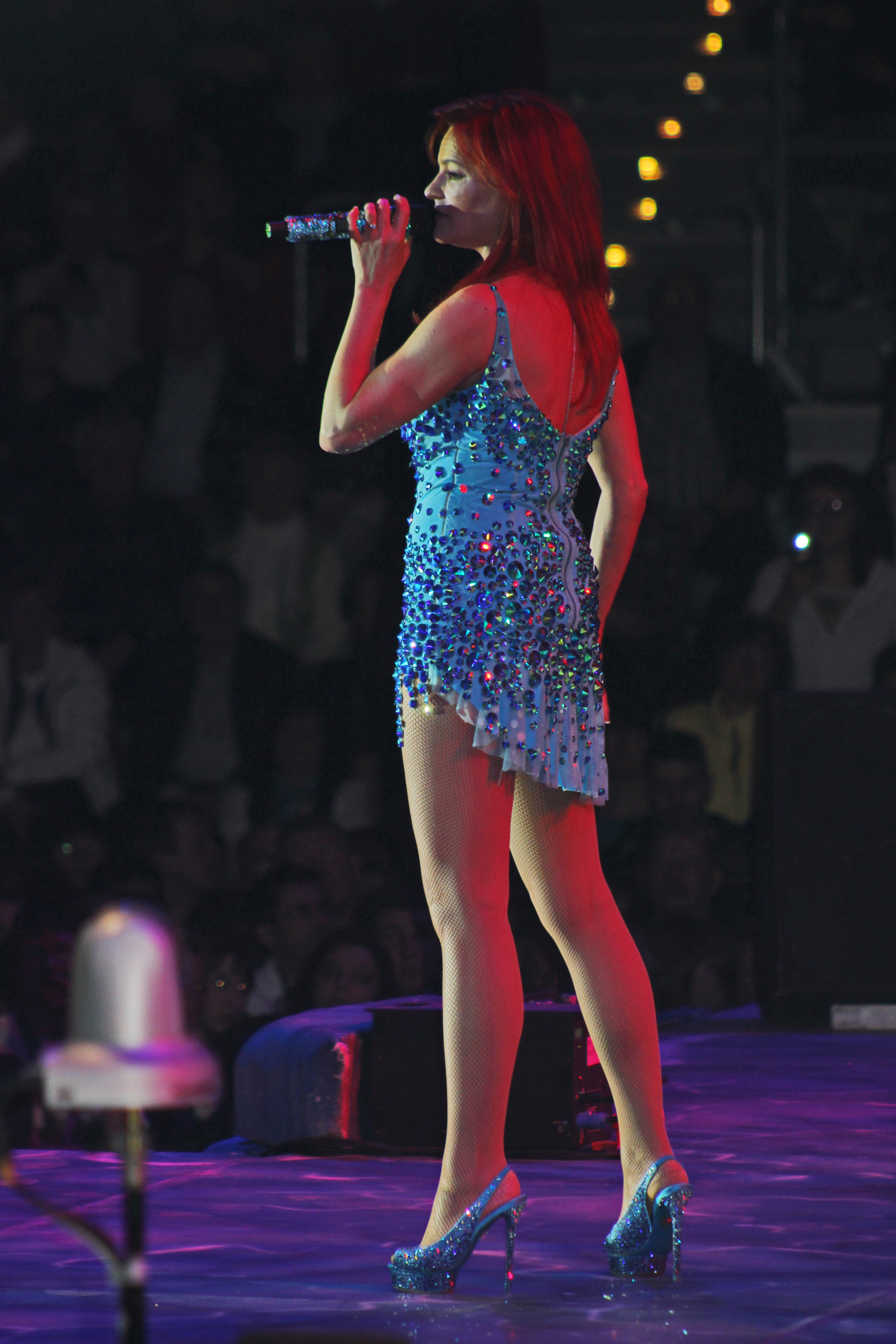
Berg performing in Chemnitz in February 2014, wearing one of her trademark stage outfits

Berg is known not only for her music, but also increasingly for her stage outfits. She favours miniskirts, suspenders, and knee-highs. She was quoted as saying that "when you reach 40, you do have to make an effort to keep men looking in your direction". Reviewers often criticise "the textual and musical randomness of Berg's songs, which almost always follow a simple 1-2-1-2 dance rhythm". In 2013, the image of women and relationships in Berg's lyrics was described by Georg Seeßlen as "antifeminist", as they engage in the notion that a woman cannot be happy without a man and that she should forgive him for everything negative. These reproaches were contested by Kerstin Decker in 2016.

== Discography ==
=== Albums ===
==== Studio albums ====
Year	Album	Peak positions					Certification
Year	Album	GER	AUT	DEN	NL	SWI	Certification
1992	Du bist frei	49	40	–	–	–	
1995	Gefühle	10	10	14	–	14	
1997	Träume lügen nicht	71	–	–	–	–	
1998	Zwischen tausend Gefühlen	86	–	–	–	–	
1999	Weil ich verliebt bin	–	–	–	–	–	
2001	Wo liegt das Paradies	42	–	–	–	–	
2002	Nah am Feuer	18	26	–	–	–	
2003	Machtlos	1	8	–	–	–	
2004	Du	1	1	–	–	33	
2006	Splitternackt	1	1	–	–	19	
2008	Dezember Nacht	8	9	–	–	95	
2009	Zwischen Himmel & Erde	1	1	–	–	9	
2010	Schwerelos	1	1	–	–	9	
2011	Abenteuer	1	1	–	–	2	
2013	Atlantis	1	1	5	27	1	
2016	Seelenbeben	1	1	–	–	1	
2019	Mosaik	1	1	–	–	1	
2022	Ich würd's wieder tun	1	1	–	–	2	
2023	Weihnacht	1	3	–	–	3	
2024	Andrea Berg	1	1	–	–	1	

==== Compilation albums ====
Year	Album	Peak positions				Certification
Year	Album	GER	AUT	DEN	SWI	Certification
2001	Best Of	1	5	–	56	
2007	Die neue Best Of	4	1	–	7	
2013	My Danish Collection	–	–	1	–	
2017	25 Jahre Abenteuer Leben	1	2	–	2	

=== Singles ===
(selective charting singles)

Year	Single	Peak positions			Album
Year	Single	GER	AUT	SWI	Album
2001	"Du hast mich tausendmal belogen"	96	–	–	Wo liegt das Paradies
2006	"Aba Heidschi Bumbeidschi"	46	65	–	Dezembernacht
2010	"Ich liebe das Leben"	81	–	–	Schwerelos
2010	"Du kannst noch nicht mal richtig lügen"	91	73	–	Schwerelos
2013	"Das Gefühl"	52	58	49	Atlantis
2013	"Atlantis lebt"	84	–	–	Atlantis
2016	"Diese Nacht ist jede Sünde wert"	44	37	–	Seelenbeben
2016	"Ich werde lächeln wenn Du gehst"	–	75	–	Seelenbeben

=== DVDs and blu-rays ===
Year	Single	Peak positions		
Year	Single	GER	AUT	SWI
2003	Emotionen Hautnah	64	–	–
2004	Eine Reise durch die Seele	51	–	–
2006	Live – Das große Konzert in Oberhausen	–	–	–
2009	Das Konzert – Zwischen Himmel und Erde	–	1	–
2011	Schwerelos – Touredition	–	2	3
2012	Andrea Berg – Abenteuer live!	–	–	–
