= The Final Album: The Ultimate Best Of =

Greatest hits album by Modern Talking
- Released: 23 June 2003
- Recorded: 1984–2003
- Genre: Eurodisco
- Label: Hansa
- Producer: Dieter Bohlen; Luis Rodríguez; Axel Breitung; Thorsten Brötzmann

Modern Talking chronology
Universe (2003)	The Final Album: The Ultimate Best Of (2003)

Professional ratings
Review scores
Source	Rating
laut.de	2/5 stars

The Final Album: The Ultimate Best Of is a greatest hits album by German duo Modern Talking, released on 23 June 2003 by Hansa Records. It consists of singles released from 1984 to 2003.

== Track listing ==
All tracks are written by Dieter Bohlen. All tracks are produced by Bohlen, except where noted.

No.	Title	Producer(s)	Length
1.	"You're My Heart, You're My Soul"	Bohlen; Luis Rodríguez^{[a]}	3:15
2.	"You Can Win If You Want" (Original No 1 Mix '84)		3:46
3.	"Cheri, Cheri Lady"		3:45
4.	"Brother Louie"		3:41
5.	"Atlantis Is Calling (S.O.S. for Love)"		3:48
6.	"Geronimo's Cadillac"	Bohlen; Rodríguez^{[a]}	3:16
7.	"Give Me Peace on Earth"	Bohlen; Rodríguez^{[a]}	4:12
8.	"Jet Airliner"	Bohlen; Rodríguez^{[a]}	4:21
9.	"In 100 Years..."	Bohlen; Rodríguez^{[a]}	3:57
10.	"You're My Heart, You're My Soul '98"	Bohlen; Rodríguez^{[a]}	3:49
11.	"Brother Louie '98"		3:35
12.	"You Are Not Alone" (video version)		3:23
13.	"Sexy, Sexy Lover" (vocal version)		3:33
14.	"China in Her Eyes" (video version)		3:09
15.	"Don't Take Away My Heart" (new vocal version)		3:54
16.	"Win the Race" (radio edit)		3:35
17.	"Last Exit to Brooklyn"		3:16
18.	"Ready for the Victory" (radio version)	Bohlen; Axel Breitung^{[a]}	3:31
19.	"Juliet"	Bohlen; Thorsten Brötzmann^{[a]}	3:37
20.	"TV Makes the Superstar" (radio edit)	Bohlen; Brötzmann^{[a]}	3:44

=== Notes ===
- ^{^[a]} signifies a co-producer

== Personnel ==
- Dieter Bohlen – production, arrangements
- Luis Rodríguez – co-production (tracks 1, 6–10)
- Axel Breitung – co-production (track 18)
- Thorsten Brötzmann – co-production (tracks 19, 20)
- Manfred Esser, Wolfgang Wilde, Stephan Pick, Fryderyk Gabowicz – photos
- Ronald Reinsberg – artwork

== Charts ==
=== Weekly charts ===
Weekly chart performance for The Final Album: The Ultimate Best Of
Chart (2003)	Peak position
Austrian Albums (Ö3 Austria)	39
Czech Albums (ČNS IFPI)	77
European Albums (Music & Media)	14
German Albums (Offizielle Top 100)	3
Hungarian Albums (MAHASZ)	18
Swiss Albums (Schweizer Hitparade)	53

=== Year-end charts ===
Year-end chart performance for The Final Album: The Ultimate Best Of
Chart (2003)	Position
German Albums (Offizielle Top 100)	97

== Certifications ==
Certifications for The Final Album: The Ultimate Best Of
Region	Certification	Certified units/sales
Germany (BVMI)	Gold	100,000^{‡}
Russia (NFPF)	Platinum	20,000^{*}
^{*} Sales figures based on certification alone.^{‡} Sales+streaming figures based on certification alone.
