= Back for Good (album) =

Remix album by Modern Talking
- Released: 30 March 1998
- Length: 69:20
- Label: Hansa
- Producers: Dieter Bohlen; Luis Rodríguez

Modern Talking chronology
In the Garden of Venus (1987)	Back for Good (1998)	Alone (1999)

Singles from Back for Good
- 1. "You're My Heart, You're My Soul '98" Released: 16 March 1998; 2. "Brother Louie '98" Released: 20 July 1998; 3. "Space Mix '98" / "We Take the Chance" Released: 23 November 1998

Back for Good is the seventh studio album by German duo Modern Talking, released on 30 March 1998 by Hansa Records, following the reunion of the duo. The album includes new versions of 11 previous singles, four new songs, two remixes and a medley. Back for Good debuted atop the German Albums Chart on 13 April 1998 and spent a total of five weeks at the top. It was eventually certified five-times gold by the Bundesverband Musikindustrie (BVMI), denoting shipments in excess of 1.25 million units in Germany. The album was also successful outside of Germany, topping the charts in Austria, Finland, Norway, Sweden and Switzerland.

== Music style ==
The reunion of Thomas Anders and Dieter Bohlen as Modern Talking resulted in a different sound compared to their original 1980s sound. The duo came back recording their materials based on the demand of the central European markets. The singles including "You're My Heart, You're My Soul '98" consisted of up-tempo beats as well as raps performed by Eric Singleton. Most of Modern Talking's materials could no longer be viewed as Europop, instead they were pure electronic music numbers with an exception of some of the tracks on Back for Good including the re-packaged versions of "Lady Lai" and "Give Me Peace on Earth" and the new ballads "I Will Follow You" and "Don't Play with My Heart".

== Reception ==
AllMusic gave the album four stars out of five.

== Track listing ==
All tracks are written by Dieter Bohlen.

No.	Title	Length
1.	"You're My Heart, You're My Soul" (New Version)	3:47
2.	"Brother Louie" (New Version)	3:36
3.	"I Will Follow You"	3:56
4.	"Cheri, Cheri Lady" (New Version)	3:00
5.	"You Can Win If You Want" (New Version)	3:25
6.	"Don't Play with My Heart"	3:23
7.	"Atlantis Is Calling" (New Version)	3:20
8.	"Geronimo's Cadillac" (New Version)	3:02
9.	"Give Me Peace on Earth" (New Version)	4:08
10.	"We Take the Chance"	3:59
11.	"Jet Airliner" (New Version)	3:51
12.	"Lady Lai" (New Version)	4:56
13.	"Anything Is Possible"	3:36
14.	"In 100 Years" (New Version)	3:53
15.	"Angie's Heart" (New Version)	3:28
16.	"You're My Heart, You're My Soul" (Modern Talking Mix '98) (featuring Eric Singleton)	3:10
17.	"You Can Win If You Want" (Original No.1 Mix '84)	3:40
18.	"No. 1 Hit Medley"	7:03

== Personnel ==
- Dieter Bohlen – backing vocals, production
- Thomas Anders – lead vocals, keyboards, piano
- Systems in Blue (Rolf Köhler, Michael Scholz, Detlef Wiedeke) – backing vocals, falsetto choir (uncredited)
- Luis Rodríguez – co-production
- Amadeus Crotti – arrangements (track 18)
- Lato Titenkov – arrangements (track 18)
- Eric Singleton – vocals (track 16)
- Manfred Esser – photos
- Ronald Reinsberg – cover design, art direction

== Charts ==
=== Weekly charts ===
Weekly chart performance for Back for Good
Chart (1998)	Peak position
Austrian Albums (Ö3 Austria)	1
Belgian Albums (Ultratop Flanders)	2
Belgian Albums (Ultratop Wallonia)	2
Czech Albums (ČNS IFPI)	1
Danish Albums (Hitlisten)	2
Dutch Albums (Album Top 100)	3
European Albums (Music & Media)	1
Finnish Albums (Suomen virallinen lista)	1
French Albums (SNEP)	2
German Albums (Offizielle Top 100)	1
Greek Albums (IFPI)	2
Hungarian Albums (MAHASZ)	1
Norwegian Albums (VG-lista)	1
Portuguese Albums (AFP)	3
Spanish Albums (AFYVE)	6
Swedish Albums (Sverigetopplistan)	1
Swiss Albums (Schweizer Hitparade)	1

=== Year-end charts ===
1998 year-end chart performance for Back for Good
Chart (1998)	Position
Austrian Albums (Ö3 Austria)	5
Belgian Albums (Ultratop Flanders)	33
Belgian Albums (Ultratop Wallonia)	24
Dutch Albums (Album Top 100)	53
European Albums (Music & Media)	7
French Albums (SNEP)	29
German Albums (Offizielle Top 100)	3
Swedish Albums (Sverigetopplistan)	8
Swiss Albums (Schweizer Hitparade)	10

1999 year-end chart performance for Back for Good
Chart (1999)	Position
Belgian Albums (Ultratop Wallonia)	97

2000 year-end chart performance for Back for Good
Chart (2000)	Position
Finnish Albums (Suomen virallinen lista)	8

== Certifications ==
Certifications for Back for Good
Region	Certification	Certified units/sales
Belgium (BRMA)	Platinum	50,000^{*}
Finland (Musiikkituottajat)	Platinum	74,348
France (SNEP)	Platinum	300,000^{*}
Germany (BVMI)	5× Gold	1,250,000^{^}
Italy (FIMI)	2× Platinum	200,000^{*}
Latvia (LaMPA)	Platinum	8,000
Netherlands (NVPI)	Gold	50,000^{^}
Poland (ZPAV)	Platinum	100,000^{*}
Spain (Promusicae)	Platinum	100,000^{^}
Sweden (GLF)	2× Platinum	160,000^{^}
Switzerland (IFPI Switzerland)	2× Platinum	100,000^{^}
Summaries
Europe (IFPI)	3× Platinum	3,000,000^{*}
^{*} Sales figures based on certification alone.^{^} Shipments figures based on certification alone.

== See also ==
- List of best-selling albums in Germany
