= Alone (Modern Talking album) =

Studio album by Modern Talking
- Released: 19 February 1999
- Recorded: 1998
- Genre: Eurodance
- Length: 76:16
- Label: Hansa
- Producer: Dieter Bohlen; Luis Rodríguez

Modern Talking chronology
Back for Good (1998)	Alone (1999)	Year of the Dragon (2000)

Singles from Alone
- 1. "You Are Not Alone" Released: 1 February 1999; 2. "Sexy, Sexy Lover" Released: 17 May 1999

Professional ratings
Review scores
Source	Rating
AllMusic	2.5/5 stars

Alone is the eighth studio album by German duo Modern Talking, released on 19 February 1999 by Hansa Records. The album was supported by two singles, "You Are Not Alone" and "Sexy, Sexy Lover", which reached numbers seven and 15 in Germany, respectively. The album debuted atop the German Albums Chart on 8 March 1999, spending four consecutive weeks at the top and 27 weeks altogether on the chart. Alone was eventually certified platinum by the Bundesverband Musikindustrie (BVMI), denoting shipments in excess of 500,000 units in Germany.

== Track listing ==
All lyrics are written by Dieter Bohlen, except where noted; all music is composed by Bohlen, except where noted.

No.	Title	Lyrics	Music	Length
1.	"You Are Not Alone"			3:41
2.	"Sexy, Sexy Lover"			3:33
3.	"I Can't Give You More"			3:41
4.	"Just Close Your Eyes"			4:17
5.	"Don't Let Me Go"			3:20
6.	"I'm So Much in Love"			3:53
7.	"Rouge et noir"			3:14
8.	"All I Have"			4:20
9.	"Can't Get Enough"			3:35
10.	"Love Is Like a Rainbow"	Thomas Anders	Anders	3:58
11.	"How You Mend a Broken Heart"			4:14
12.	"It Hurts So Good"	Anders		3:22
13.	"I'll Never Give You Up"	Anders		3:26
14.	"Don't Let Me Down"			3:57
15.	"Taxi Girl"			3:09
16.	"For Always and Ever"	Anders	Anders	3:22
17.	"Space Mix" (The Ultimate Nonstop Mix) (featuring Eric Singleton)			17:14

== Personnel ==
- Dieter Bohlen – guitar, backing vocals, production, arrangements
- Thomas Anders – lead & backing vocals, piano, keyboards
- Rolf Köhler – backing vocals, falsetto choir (uncredited)
- Michael Scholz – backing vocals, falsetto choir (uncredited)
- Detlef Wiedeke – backing vocals, falsetto choir (uncredited)
- Luis Rodríguez – co-production
- Amadeus Crotti, Thorsten Brötzmann, Lalo Titenkov, Jerry Ropero – keyboards
- Gabo – cover photo
- Manfred Esser – booklet photos
- Ronald Reinsberg – cover design, art direction

== Charts ==
=== Weekly charts ===
Weekly chart performance for Alone
Chart (1999)	Peak position
Austrian Albums (Ö3 Austria)	2
Czech Albums (ČNS IFPI)	2
European Albums (Music & Media)	6
Finnish Albums (Suomen virallinen lista)	4
French Albums (SNEP)	11
German Albums (Offizielle Top 100)	1
Greek Albums (IFPI)	6
Hungarian Albums (MAHASZ)	1
Norwegian Albums (VG-lista)	9
Spanish Albums (AFYVE)	12
Swedish Albums (Sverigetopplistan)	5
Swiss Albums (Schweizer Hitparade)	3

=== Year-end charts ===
1999 year-end chart performance for Alone
Chart (1999)	Position
Austrian Albums (Ö3 Austria)	12
European Albums (Music & Media)	35
German Albums (Offizielle Top 100)	7
Swedish Albums (Sverigetopplistan)	76
Swiss Albums (Schweizer Hitparade)	42

2000 year-end chart performance for Alone
Chart (2000)	Position
Finnish Albums (Suomen virallinen lista)	55

== Certifications ==
Certifications for Alone
Region	Certification	Certified units/sales
Austria (IFPI Austria)	Gold	25,000^{*}
Finland (Musiikkituottajat)	Gold	35,676
Germany (BVMI)	Platinum	500,000^{^}
Poland (ZPAV)	Platinum	100,000^{*}
Spain (PROMUSICAE)	Gold	50,000^{^}
Sweden (GLF)	Platinum	80,000^{^}
Switzerland (IFPI Switzerland)	Platinum	50,000^{^}
Summaries
Europe (IFPI)	Platinum	1,000,000^{*}
^{*} Sales figures based on certification alone.^{^} Shipments figures based on certification alone.
