= Cosmic Girl =

Cosmic Girl may refer to:

== Music ==
- "Cosmic Girl" (song), a 1996 single from British funk/acid jazz band Jamiroquai's album, Travelling Without Moving
- "Cosmic Girl", a 2000 single from German europop duo Modern Talking's album, Year of the Dragon
- Jooyi, former RaNia member and current solo artist under the name of "Cosmic Girl"
- Cosmic Girls, a 13-member South Korean girl group under Starship Entertainment

== Other ==
- Cosmic Girl (aircraft), a Virgin Orbit operated Boeing 747-400 which is used for the air launch of smallsat orbital launch vehicle LauncherOne

== See also ==
- Cosmic Baton Girl / Princess Comet, a Japanese TV drama and manga series
- Comic Girls, a Japanese four-panel manga series
