= Back for Good =

Back for Good may refer to:

- "Back for Good" (song), a 1995 song recorded by British band Take That
- Back for Good (album), a 1998 album by German pop duo Modern Talking

== See also ==
- Bad for Good, a 1981 album Jim Steinman
