= We Take the Chance =

Single by Modern Talking

from the album Back for Good
- A-side: "'Space Mix '98'"
- Released: 1998
- Recorded: 1998
- Genre: Eurodance; synthpop
- Length: 4:08
- Label: Hansa
- Composer(s): Dieter Bohlen
- Producer(s): Dieter Bohlen

Modern Talking singles chronology
"Space Mix '98" (1998)	"We Take the Chance" (1998)	"You Are Not Alone" (1999)

Music video
- "We Take the Chance" on YouTube

"We Take the Chance" is a single by the German synthpop duo Modern Talking, released in 1998 as a single.

It's the double-A-side along with a megamix with all of their 1980s hit singles, named Space Mix '98, with Eric Singleton.

The song was used as the Maltese Nationalist Party's campaign song for the 1998 Malta elections. "We Take the Chance" samples Europe's song "The Final Countdown", which also happened to be used as the Nationalist Party's campaign song for the 1987 Malta elections (both of which were won by the Nationalist Party).

== Track listing ==
CD Single 74321 62737 2

1. "Space Mix '98" (feat. Eric Singleton) - 4:28
2. "We Take The Chance" - 4:07

== Credits ==
- We Take the Chance published by Blue Obsession Music/Warner/Chappell Music
