= Year of the Dragon (Modern Talking album) =

Studio album by Modern Talking
- Released: 28 February 2000
- Recorded: 1999
- Genre: Eurodance
- Length: 72:00
- Label: Hansa
- Producer: Dieter Bohlen; Luis Rodríguez

Modern Talking chronology
| Alone (1999) | Year of the Dragon (2000) | America (2001) |

Singles from Year of the Dragon
- 1. "China in Her Eyes" Released: 31 January 2000; 2. "Don't Take Away My Heart" Released: 2 May 2000

Professional ratings
Review scores
| Source | Rating |
|---|---|
| laut.de | 2/5 stars |

Year of the Dragon is the ninth studio album by German duo Modern Talking, released on 28 February 2000 by Hansa Records. The album entered the German Albums Chart at number three on 13 March 2000 and spent two weeks in the top five. It has been certified platinum by the Bundesverband Musikindustrie (BVMI), denoting shipments in excess of 300,000 units in Germany.

== Track listing ==
All tracks are written by Dieter Bohlen, except where noted.

| No. | Title | Writer(s) | Length |
|---|---|---|---|
| 1. | "China in Her Eyes" | | 4:22 |
| 2. | "Don't Take Away My Heart" | | 3:54 |
| 3. | "It's Your Smile" | | 3:31 |
| 4. | "Cosmic Girl" | | 3:41 |
| 5. | "After Your Love Is Gone" | | 3:41 |
| 6. | "Girl Out of My Dreams" | | 3:10 |
| 7. | "My Lonely Girl" | | 4:00 |
| 8. | "No Face, No Name, No Number" | | 3:59 |
| 9. | "Can't Let You Go" | | 4:22 |
| 10. | "Part Time Lover" | | 3:11 |
| 11. | "Time Is on My Side" | | 3:37 |
| 12. | "I'll Never Fall in Love Again" | | 4:39 |
| 13. | "Avec toi" | | 3:52 |
| 14. | "I'm Not Guilty" | | 3:39 |
| 15. | "Fight for the Right Love" | | 3:42 |
| 16. | "Walking in the Rain of Paris" | | 3:41 |
| 17. | "Fly to the Moon" | | 3:37 |
| 18. | "Love Is Forever" | Thomas Anders | 3:24 |
| 19. | "China in Her Eyes" (featuring Eric Singleton) | | 3:10 |

== Personnel ==
- Dieter Bohlen – production
- Thomas Anders – lead & backing vocals, piano, keyboards
- Rolf Köhler – backing vocals, falsetto choir (uncredited)
- Michael Scholz – backing vocals, falsetto choir (uncredited)
- Detlef Wiedeke – backing vocals, falsetto choir (uncredited)
- Luis Rodríguez – co-production
- Amadeus Crotti – keyboards (tracks 1, 2, 4, 5, 7, 8, 10, 11, 13, 14, 16, 17, 19)
- Lalo Titenkov – keyboards (tracks 3, 6, 9, 12, 15, 18)
- Wolfgang Wilde – photos
- Ronald Reinsberg – cover design, art direction

== Charts ==
=== Weekly charts ===
Weekly chart performance for Year of the Dragon
| Chart (2000) | Peak position |
|---|---|
| Austrian Albums (Ö3 Austria) | 5 |
| Czech Albums (ČNS IFPI) | 7 |
| European Albums (Music & Media) | 10 |
| Finnish Albums (Suomen virallinen lista) | 22 |
| German Albums (Offizielle Top 100) | 3 |
| Hungarian Albums (MAHASZ) | 3 |
| Norwegian Albums (VG-lista) | 26 |
| Swedish Albums (Sverigetopplistan) | 28 |
| Swiss Albums (Schweizer Hitparade) | 4 |

=== Year-end charts ===
Year-end chart performance for Year of the Dragon
| Chart (2000) | Position |
|---|---|
| German Albums (Offizielle Top 100) | 55 |
| Swiss Albums (Schweizer Hitparade) | 79 |

== Certifications ==
Certifications for Year of the Dragon
| Region | Certification | Certified units/sales |
|---|---|---|
| Germany (BVMI) | Platinum | 300,000^{^} |
^{^} Shipments figures based on certification alone.
