= 2 Eivissa =

German Eurodance group

- Origin: Hamburg, Germany
- Genres: House, Eurodance
- Years active: 1997–2005
- Past members: Josephine Hiebel; Ambrogio Crotti; Luis Rodríguez Salazar; David Granados Lacera; Terri Bjerre; Melanie Molinnus; Piero Brunetti

2 Eivissa were a Eurodance group from Hamburg, Germany. They are known for their 1997 hit single, "Oh La La La", which landed on the charts in several countries, and peaked at number 13 in the UK Singles Chart in November 1997. 2 Eivissa were produced by Team 33, a Hamburg, Germany based music production company. Most tracks were written and produced by Ambrogio Crotti, Luigi Ricco and David Lacera.

The group was originally fronted by singers Terri Bjerre and Melannie Molinnus on the first album. Bjerre, was the lead vocalist of the band, who later pursued a solo career as Terri B!. Bjerre was replaced by Jobel (Lian Ross) as vocalist in 1999. However, the live act was fronted by Jane and Francine (a.k.a. 2 Blond Bandits) until 2000. The project was stopped in 2005.

The 2 Eivissa project was resurrected in 2007, in the song "Hot Summer Night (Oh La La La)" by David Tavaré, using a vocal sample from "Oh La La La".

== Discography ==
=== Studio albums ===
Year	Album details
Oh La La La	Release date: 1998; Label: Control Records; Formats: CD
Are You Ready?	Release date: 28 July 2003; Label: Blanco Y Negro; Formats: CD
"—" denotes releases that did not chart

=== Singles ===
Year	Single	Peak chart positions							Album
Year	Single	GER	IRE	ITA	NED	SPA	UK	U.S. Dance	Album
1997	"Oh La La La"	43	19	1	30	1	13	10	Oh La La La
1998	"Move Your Body"	—	—	—	—	—	—	—	Oh La La La
1998	"Open Your Eyes"	—	—	—	—	—	—	—	Oh La La La
1999	"Shattered Dreams"	—	—	—	—	—	—	—	Oh La La La
1999	"I Wanna Be Your Toy"	94	—	—	—	11	—	—	Are You Ready?
2000	"Viva La Fiesta"	—	—	—	—	—	—	—	Are You Ready?
2001	"El Pelotón"	—	—	—	—	—	—	—	Are You Ready?
2002	"Meaning of My Life"	—	—	—	—	—	—	—	Are You Ready?
2003	"Fire in the Sky" (vs. 2 Bells)	—	—	—	—	—	—	—	Are You Ready?
2003	"Boy Are You Ready"	—	—	—	—	—	—	—	
"—" denotes releases that did not chart
