= Oh La La La (2 Eivissa song) =

Single by 2 Eivissa

from the album Oh La La La
- B-side: "Remix"
- Released: June 6, 1997
- Genre: Eurodance
- Length: 3:35
- Label: Club Tools
- Songwriters: Pierro Brunetti; Ambrogio Crotti; Luigi Ricco
- Producer: Team 33

2 Eivissa singles chronology
"Oh La La La" (1997)	"Open Your Eyes" (1998)

Music video
- "Oh La La La" on YouTube

"Oh La La La" is a song by German Eurodance group 2 Eivissa. It is produced by "Team 33" and was released on 6 June 1997, as their debut and lead single from the album of the same name. The song is their most commercially successful single to date, topping the chart in Spain and peaking at number two in Italy. It also reached number 13 in the United Kingdom and number 19 in Ireland. On the Eurochart Hot 100, "Oh La La La" peaked at number 32 in October 1997. The song interpolates the hook and guitar riff from Crystal Waters' 1991 song "Gypsy Woman".

In 2007, the song was reworked and released as "Hot Summer Night (Oh La La La)", by Spanish singer and DJ David Tavaré, which credited 2 Eivissa as featuring artists due to the usage of vocal samples. It was a smash hit across Europe, peaking at number two in France and Spain.

== Critical reception ==
Larry Flick from Billboard magazine wrote that "this is good-time dance fodder with no lofty agenda. Instead, Euro-pop producers Team 33 has crafted a galloping bassline that make you want to twirl and sing along with the song's giddy chorus. Fun, fun, fun stuff". Pan-European magazine Music & Media noted that "their fine production job makes the most of a strong hook and nagging chorus, reminiscent of Crystal Waters' 'Gypsy Woman'." Alan Jones from Music Week described the song as "a high octane pop/house smash of maddening simplicity." He concluded, "Get used to it, for it's going to be a hit."

== Music video ==
The accompanying music video for "Oh La La La" was directed by Camelot.

== Track listing ==
- CD maxi - Europe (1997)
1. "Oh La La La" (radio mix) - 3:35
2. "Oh La La La" (Cool Summer mix) - 3:38
3. "Oh La La La" (extended version) - 4:58
4. "Oh La La La" (Salinas mix) - 5:11
5. "Oh La La La" (Eivissa '97 club mix) - 6:19
6. "Oh La La La" (S/M In Motion remix) - 6:32

== Charts ==
Chart (1997)	Peak position
Belgium Dance (Ultratop)	20
Canada Dance/Urban (RPM)	3
Europe (Eurochart Hot 100)	32
Germany (GfK)	43
Iceland (Íslenski Listinn Topp 40)	24
Ireland (IRMA)	19
Israel (Israeli Singles Chart)	8
Italy (Musica e dischi)	2
Netherlands (Dutch Top 40)	24
Netherlands (Single Top 100)	30
Scotland (OCC)	19
Spain (AFYVE)	1
UK Singles (OCC)	13
UK Dance (OCC)	8
US Hot Dance Club Play (Billboard)	10
