= Hot Summer Night (Oh La La La) =

Single by David Tavaré featuring 2 Eivissa

from the album La Vida Viene Y Va
- B-side: "Remix"
- Released: July 2007 (Spain); July 2008 (France)
- Genre: House
- Length: 3:38
- Label: M6 Interactions; Blanco Y Negro
- Songwriters: Ambrogio Crotti, Luigi Ricco

David Tavaré featuring 2 Eivissa singles chronology
"Summerlove" (2006)	"Hot Summer Night (Oh La La La)" (2007)	"Call Me Baby (If You Don't Know My Name)" (2008)

"Hot Summer Night (Oh La La La)" is a song recorded by Spanish singer David Tavaré featuring 2 Eivissa who features in the credits (the song uses a vocal sample from 2 Eivissa's "Oh La La La"). Luigi Ricco and Ambrogio Crotti, from "Team 33", who produced the original "Oh La La La", also produced Tavaré's version. It was the second single by the singer and was released first in July 2007 in Spain, where it reached number 2 on music charts. It also reached number two for two non consecutive weeks in France, about a year later.

== Track listings ==
CD single

1. "Hot Summer Night (Oh La La La)" (radio) — 3:10
2. "Hot Summer Night (Oh La La La)" (extended) — 5:14
3. "Hot Summer Night (Oh La La La)" (33rmxUK) — 3:54
4. "Hot Summer Night (Oh La La La)" (video) — 3:06

CD maxi

1. "Hot Summer Night (Oh La La La)" (radio mix) — 3:06
2. "Hot Summer Night (Oh La La La)" (Latin mix) — 3:06
3. "Hot Summer Night (Oh La La La)" (extended mix) — 5:10
4. "Hot Summer Night (Oh La La La)" (video)

12" maxi

1. "Hot Summer Night (Oh La La La)" (radio mix) — 3:06
2. "Hot Summer Night (Oh La La La)" (Latin mix) — 3:06
3. "Hot Summer Night (Oh La La La)" (extended mix) — 5:10

Digital download

1. "Hot Summer Night (Oh La La La)" (radio) — 3:10
2. "Hot Summer Night (Oh La La La)" (extended) — 5:14
3. "Hot Summer Night (Oh La La La)" (33rmxUK) — 3:54
4. "Hot Summer Night (Oh La La La)" (video) — 3:06

== Charts ==
=== Weekly charts ===
Weekly chart performance for "Hot Summer Night (Oh La La La)"
Chart (2007–2008)	Peak position
Belgium (Ultratop 50 Wallonia)	14
France (SNEP)	2
Russia Airplay (TopHit)	11
Spain (Promusicae)	2

=== Year-end charts ===
2007 year-end chart performance for "Hot Summer Night (Oh La La La)"
Chart (2007)	Position
Russia Airplay (TopHit)	118

2008 year-end chart performance for "Hot Summer Night (Oh La La La)"
Chart (2008)	Position
Eurochart Hot 100	57
French Airplay Chart	43
French Digital Chart	40
French Singles Chart	6
Russia Airplay (TopHit)	84

=== Decade-end charts ===
Decade-end chart performance for "Hot Summer Night (Oh La La La)"
Chart (2000–2009)	Position
Russia Airplay (TopHit)	140
