= Last Exit to Brooklyn (disambiguation) =

Last Exit to Brooklyn is a 1964 novel by Hubert Selby Jr.

Last Exit to Brooklyn may also refer to:

- Last Exit to Brooklyn (film), a 1989 film based on the novel
- Last Exit to Brooklyn (soundtrack), a soundtrack album from the film, or the title song, by Mark Knopfler
- "Last Exit to Brooklyn" (song), by Modern Talking, 2001

== See also ==
- Last Exit on Brooklyn, a defunct coffeehouse in Seattle, Washington, US
