= No Face, No Name, No Number =

- Remixes cover.

Single by Modern Talking

from the album Year of the Dragon
- Released: 2000
- Recorded: 1999
- Genre: Europop
- Length: 4:02
- Label: BMG; Ariola
- Songwriter(s): Dieter Bohlen
- Producer(s): Dieter Bohlen; Luis Rodríguez

Modern Talking singles chronology
"Don't Take Away My Heart" (2000)	"No Face, No Name, No Number" (2000)	"Win the Race" (2001)

No Face, No Name, No Number is a song from Modern Talking's ninth album, Year of the Dragon. Written by Dieter Bohlen in 2000, it was released as a remix single, containing four remixes of the song, but the album version charted in some airplay charts. Dieter Bohlen has sampling of the Melody, of the song Today, Tonight, Tomorrow on the Deutschland sucht den Superstar album United.

In 2010, ex-Miss Universe Oxana Fedorova recorded the song "At Step One", which is considered to be a plagiarism of "No Face, No Name, No Number". Macedonian pop singer Sasho Spasovski, among others, has also plagiarised the song, with the title being 'Dzvezda Denica'. Bulgarian folk singer Kamelia has also used interpolation from the song into the latin mix of her song 'Kade si ti'.

== Track listing ==
=== Remixes ===
1. "No Face, No Name, No Number" (Latin Radio Mix) - 3:05
2. "No Face, No Name, No Number" (Airplay Disco Mix) - 3:35
3. "No Face, No Name, No Number" (Latin Club Mix) - 8:19
4. "No Face, No Name, No Number" (Extended Disco Mix) - 6:39

== Charts ==
=== Weekly charts ===
Chart (2000)	Peak position
Romania (Romanian Top 100)	1

=== Year-end charts ===
Chart (2000)	Position
Romania (Romanian Top 100)	25

== See also ==
- List of Romanian Top 100 number ones of the 2000s
