= Space Mix '98 =

Single by Modern Talking

from the album Back for Good and Alone
- Released: 1998
- Recorded: 1998
- Genre: Dance-pop
- Length: 4:28; 17:15 (album version)
- Label: BMG; Ariola
- Songwriter: Dieter Bohlen
- Producers: Dieter Bohlen; Luis Rodríguez

Modern Talking singles chronology
| "Brother Louie '98" (1998) | "Space Mix '98" (1998) | "We Take the Chance" (1998) |

Space Mix '98 is the third single from the Modern Talking seventh album, Back for Good. It's a megamix. The single was not released in Germany, Austria and Switzerland, but in the other countries in Europe and the rest of the world.

== Track listing ==
CD Single France 1998

1. "Space Mix" (feat. Eric Singleton) - 4:28
2. "We Take The Chance" - 4:07

CD-Maxi Hansa 74321 63193 2 (BMG) 1998

1. "Space Mix" (feat. Eric Singleton) - 4:28
2. "We Take The Chance" - 4:07
3. "You Can Win if You Want" (New Version) - 3:37

12" Single BMG 74321 59782-1 1998

1. "Space Mix '98" - 21:55
2. "Space Mix '98" (Short Version) - 4:37
3. "You're My Heart, You're My Soul" (Modern Talking Mix '98 Feat. Eric Singleton) - 3:17
4. "You're My Heart, You're My Soul" (Modern Talking Mix '98 Feat. Eric Singleton Extended) - 6:57

== Track list from the Space Mix '98 ==
1. "Cheri, Cheri Lady"
2. "Brother Louie"
3. "You Can Win If You Want"
4. "Doctor For My Heart"
5. "Geronimo's Cadillac"
6. "Hey You"
7. "Heaven Will Know"
8. "You're My Heart, You're My Soul"
9. "Sweet Little Sheila"
10. "Atlantis Is Calling"
11. "In 100 Years"
12. "Jet Airliner"
13. "Locomotion Tango"
14. "You're My Heart, You're My Soul"

== Charts ==
| Chart (1998–99) | Peak position |
|---|---|
| Argentina | 19 |
| Belgium (Ultratop 50 Wallonia) | 34 |
| France (SNEP) | 14 |
| Greece | 15 |
| Hungary | 4 |
| Europe | 56 |

== Personnel ==
- Produced by Dieter Bohlen
- Co-produced by Luis Rodríguez
- Written by Dieter Bohlen
- Arranged by Amadeus Crotti and Lato Titenkov
- Space Mix published by Hanseatic
- The songs included in the Space Mix were published by Blue Obsession Music/Warner/Chappell Music/Intro
- We Take the Chance published by Blue Obsession Music/Warner Chappell
- Photo: Manfred Esser
- Graphic design: Ronald Reinsberg, Berlin
