= Ready for the Victory =

Single by Modern Talking

from the album Victory
- Released: 18 February 2002
- Genre: Eurodance; electronic rock
- Length: 3:31
- Label: BMG; Ariola
- Songwriter(s): Dieter Bohlen
- Producer(s): Dieter Bohlen; Axel Breitung

Modern Talking singles chronology
| "Last Exit to Brooklyn" (2001) | "Ready for the Victory" (2002) | "Juliet" (2002) |

Music video
- "Ready for the Victory" on YouTube

"Ready for the Victory" is a song by Modern Talking. It was the first single on their eleventh album, Victory.

In Russia, the single was released with additional tracks including the megamix "Space Mix '98".

== Track listing ==
- CD maxi single (Hansa 74321 92038 2 (BMG) / EAN 0743219203823)
1. "Ready for the Victory" (radio version) – 3:31
2. "Ready for the Victory" (alternative radio version) – 3:16
3. "Ready for the Victory" (club version) – 5:12
4. "Ready for the Victory" (extended version) – 5:27
5. "Ready for the Victory" (alternative radio version extended) – 5:15
6. "Ready for the Victory" (instrumental) – 3:31
7. "Ready for the Victory" (video)
- Russian CD maxi single
1. "Ready for the Victory" (radio version) – 3:31
2. "Ready for the Victory" (alternative radio version) – 3:16
3. "Ready for the Victory" (extended version) – 5:27
4. "Rouge Et Noir" (album version) – 3:14
5. "Space Mix" (album version) – 17:14

== Charts ==
=== Weekly charts ===
Weekly chart performance for "Ready for the Victory"
| Chart (2002) | Peak position |
|---|---|
| Austria (Ö3 Austria Top 40) | 20 |
| Germany (GfK) | 7 |
| Romania (Romanian Top 100) | 27 |
| Spain (PROMUSICAE) | 11 |
| Switzerland (Schweizer Hitparade) | 62 |

=== Year-end charts ===
Year-end chart performance for "Ready for the Victory"
| Chart (2002) | Position |
|---|---|
| Germany (Media Control) | 91 |
