= In the Middle of Nowhere =

Studio album by Modern Talking
- Released: 10 November 1986
- Recorded: 1986
- Genre: Eurodisco
- Length: 36:58
- Label: Hansa
- Producers: Dieter Bohlen; Luis Rodríguez

Modern Talking chronology
Ready for Romance (1986)	In the Middle of Nowhere (1986)	Romantic Warriors (1987)

Singles from In the Middle of Nowhere
- 1. "Geronimo's Cadillac" Released: 6 October 1986; 2. "Give Me Peace on Earth" Released: 11 November 1986; 3. "Lonely Tears in Chinatown" Released: 1987

In the Middle of Nowhere is the fourth studio album by German duo Modern Talking, released on 10 November 1986 by Hansa Records. The album spawned the single "Geronimo's Cadillac", which charted within the top five in Germany and Austria, while entering the top 10 in many others including Switzerland, Sweden and Norway.

The album debuted at number one in Germany on 1 December 1986, spending a total of seven weeks within the top 10 on the chart. It was eventually certified gold by the Bundesverband Musikindustrie (BVMI), denoting shipments in excess of 250,000 units in Germany.

== Track listing ==
All tracks are written by Dieter Bohlen.

Side one
No.	Title	Length
1.	"Geronimo's Cadillac"	3:16
2.	"Riding on a White Swan"	3:52
3.	"Give Me Peace on Earth"	4:11
4.	"Sweet Little Sheila"	3:03
5.	"Ten Thousand Lonely Drums"	3:29

Side two
No.	Title	Length
6.	"Lonely Tears in Chinatown"	3:29
7.	"In Shaire"	3:42
8.	"Stranded in the Middle of Nowhere"	4:29
9.	"The Angels Sing in New York City"	3:32
10.	"Princess of the Night"	3:55
Total length:		36:58

== Personnel ==
- Dieter Bohlen – guitar, backing vocals (9), production, arrangements
- Thomas Anders – lead vocals, piano, keyboards
- Rolf Köhler – backing vocals, falsetto choir (uncredited)
- Michael Scholz – backing vocals, falsetto choir (uncredited)
- Detlef Wiedeke – backing vocals, falsetto choir (uncredited)
- Birger Corleis – backing vocals, falsetto choir (uncredited)
- Luis Rodríguez – co-production
- Manfred Vormstein – art direction, design, cover photo
- Matthias Kortemeier – design
- Didi Zill – artists photo

== Charts ==
=== Weekly charts ===
Weekly chart performance for In the Middle of Nowhere
Chart (1986–1987)	Peak position
Austrian Albums (Ö3 Austria)	2
Dutch Albums (Album Top 100)	19
European Albums (Music & Media)	15
Finnish Albums (Suomen virallinen lista)	12
German Albums (Offizielle Top 100)	1
Norwegian Albums (VG-lista)	8
Swedish Albums (Sverigetopplistan)	9
Swiss Albums (Schweizer Hitparade)	3

=== Year-end charts ===
Year-end chart performance for In the Middle of Nowhere
Chart (1987)	Position
Austrian Albums (Ö3 Austria)	27
European Albums (Music & Media)	96
German Albums (Offizielle Top 100)	62

== Certifications ==
Certifications for In the Middle of Nowhere
Region	Certification	Certified units/sales
Germany (BVMI)	Gold	250,000^{^}
Hong Kong (IFPI Hong Kong)	Gold	10,000^{*}
Spain (Promusicae)	Platinum	100,000^{^}
Switzerland (IFPI Switzerland)	Platinum	50,000^{^}
^{*} Sales figures based on certification alone.^{^} Shipments figures based on certification alone.
