= Lonely Tears in Chinatown =

Single by Modern Talking

from the album In the Middle of Nowhere
- B-side: "Give Me Peace on Earth"
- Released: 1987
- Recorded: 1986
- Genre: Synth-pop; Europop
- Length: 3:29
- Label: Hansa
- Songwriter: Dieter Bohlen
- Producers: Dieter Bohlen; Luis Rodríguez

Modern Talking singles chronology
"Give Me Peace on Earth" (1986)	"Lonely Tears in Chinatown" (1987)	"Jet Airliner" (1987)

Audio video
- "Lonely Tears in Chinatown" on YouTube

"Lonely Tears in Chinatown" is a song by German pop duo Modern Talking from their fourth studio album, In the Middle of Nowhere (1986). Composed and written by Dieter Bohlen, the song was released in Spain only instead of "Give Me Peace on Earth", which was officially the second single from the album.

== Track listing ==
- 7″ single (Hansa 108 838)
1. "Lonely Tears in Chinatown" – 3:49
2. "Give Me Peace on Earth" – 4:11
- 12″ single (Hansa 608 838)
1. "Lonely Tears in Chinatown" – 3:49
2. "Give Me Peace on Earth" – 4:11

== Charts ==
Chart performance for "Lonely Tears in Chinatown"
Chart (1987)	Peak position
Spain (AFYVE)	9

== Credits ==
- Music: Dieter Bohlen
- Lyrics: Dieter Bohlen
- Lead vocals: Thomas Anders
- Producer: Dieter Bohlen
- Arrangement: Dieter Bohlen
- Co-producer: Luis Rodríguez
