= Romantic Warriors =

Studio album by Modern Talking
- Released: 8 June 1987
- Recorded: 1986–1987
- Genre: Eurodisco
- Length: 38:10
- Label: Hansa
- Producers: Dieter Bohlen; Luis Rodríguez

Modern Talking chronology
In the Middle of Nowhere (1986)	Romantic Warriors (1987)	In the Garden of Venus (1987)

Singles from Romantic Warriors
- 1. "Jet Airliner" Released: 18 May 1987; 2. "Don't Worry" Released: 1987

Professional ratings
Review scores
Source	Rating
AllMusic	2/5 stars

Romantic Warriors is the fifth studio album by German duo Modern Talking, released on 8 June 1987 by Hansa Records. It contains the single "Jet Airliner", which reached the top 10 in Germany and Austria, while entering the top 20 in Switzerland and Sweden. The album peaked at number three in Germany on 6 July 1987 and spent total of four weeks within the top 10.

== Track listing ==
All tracks are written by Dieter Bohlen.

Side one
No.	Title	Length
1.	"Jet Airliner"	4:19
2.	"Like a Hero"	3:45
3.	"Don't Worry"	3:31
4.	"Blinded by Your Love"	4:02
5.	"Romantic Warriors"	3:59

Side two
No.	Title	Length
6.	"Arabian Gold"	3:43
7.	"We Still Have Dreams"	3:18
8.	"Operator Gimme 609"	3:39
9.	"You and Me"	4:04
10.	"Charlene"	3:50
Total length:		38:10

== Personnel ==
- Dieter Bohlen – guitar, production, arrangements
- Thomas Anders – lead vocals, piano, keyboards
- Rolf Köhler – backing vocals, falsetto choir (uncredited)
- Michael Scholz – backing vocals, falsetto choir (uncredited)
- Detlef Wiedeke – backing vocals, falsetto choir (uncredited)
- Birger Corleis – backing vocals, falsetto choir (uncredited)
- Luis Rodríguez – co-production
- Manfred Vormstein – art direction, concept, photos
- Tony Stone Associates – photos
- Didi Zill – photos

== Chart ==
Chart performance for Romantic Warriors
Chart (1987)	Peak position
Austrian Albums (Ö3 Austria)	6
Dutch Albums (Album Top 100)	35
European Albums (Music & Media)	17
Finnish Albums (Suomen virallinen lista)	7
German Albums (Offizielle Top 100)	3
Norwegian Albums (VG-lista)	10
Swedish Albums (Sverigetopplistan)	15
Swiss Albums (Schweizer Hitparade)	8

== Certifications ==
Certifications for Romantic Warriors
Region	Certification	Certified units/sales
Hong Kong (IFPI Hong Kong)	Gold	10,000^{*}
Spain (Promusicae)	Platinum	100,000^{^}
Switzerland (IFPI Switzerland)	Gold	25,000^{^}
^{*} Sales figures based on certification alone.^{^} Shipments figures based on certification alone.
