= In the Garden of Venus =

Studio album by Modern Talking
- Released: 30 November 1987
- Recorded: 1987
- Genre: Eurodisco
- Length: 33:47
- Label: Hansa
- Producer: Dieter Bohlen; Luis Rodríguez

Modern Talking chronology
| Romantic Warriors (1987) | In the Garden of Venus (1987) | Back for Good (1998) |

Singles from In the Garden of Venus
- 1. "In 100 Years..." Released: 9 November 1987

Professional ratings
Review scores
| Source | Rating |
|---|---|
| AllMusic | 2/5 stars |

In the Garden of Venus is the sixth studio album by German duo Modern Talking, released on 30 November 1987 by Hansa Records. Due to lack of promotion, the album failed to match the commercial success compare to the duo's previous releases. In the Garden of Venus is also the last album before Modern Talking's first official separation in 1987; the duo, however, reunited in 1998 and released the comeback album Back for Good. The album's only single, "In 100 Years...", charted at number 30 in Germany.

== Track listing ==
All tracks are written by Dieter Bohlen.

Side one
| No. | Title | Length |
|---|---|---|
| 1. | "In 100 Years..." | 3:57 |
| 2. | "Don't Let It Get You Down" | 3:40 |
| 3. | "Who Will Save the World" | 3:45 |
| 4. | "A Telegram to Your Heart" | 2:50 |
| 5. | "It's Christmas" | 3:52 |

Side two
| No. | Title | Length |
|---|---|---|
| 6. | "Don't Lose My Number" | 3:10 |
| 7. | "Slow Motion" | 3:40 |
| 8. | "Locomotion Tango" | 3:49 |
| 9. | "Good Girls Go to Heaven – Bad Girls Go to Everywhere" | 3:37 |
| 10. | "In 100 Years (Reprise)" | 1:27 |
| Total length: | | 33:47 |

== Personnel ==
- Dieter Bohlen – guitar, backing vocals (3, 8), production, arrangements
- Thomas Anders – lead vocals, piano, keyboards
- Rolf Köhler – backing vocals, falsetto choir (uncredited)
- Michael Scholz – backing vocals, falsetto choir (uncredited)
- Detlef Wiedeke – backing vocals, falsetto choir (uncredited)
- Birger Corleis – backing vocals, falsetto choir (uncredited)
- Luis Rodríguez – co-production
- Don Landwehrle – front cover photo
- Dieter Zill – artists photo

== Charts ==
Chart performance for In the Garden of Venus
| Chart (1987) | Peak position |
|---|---|
| European Albums (Music & Media) | 39 |
| Finnish Albums (Suomen virallinen lista) | 24 |
| German Albums (Offizielle Top 100) | 35 |
| Spanish Albums (AFYVE) | 23 |
| Swedish Albums (Sverigetopplistan) | 49 |

== Certifications ==
Certifications for In the Garden of Venus
| Region | Certification | Certified units/sales |
|---|---|---|
| Spain (Promusicae) | Gold | 50,000^{^} |
^{^} Shipments figures based on certification alone.
