= Lian Ross =

German Hi-NRG/Euro disco singer (born 1962)

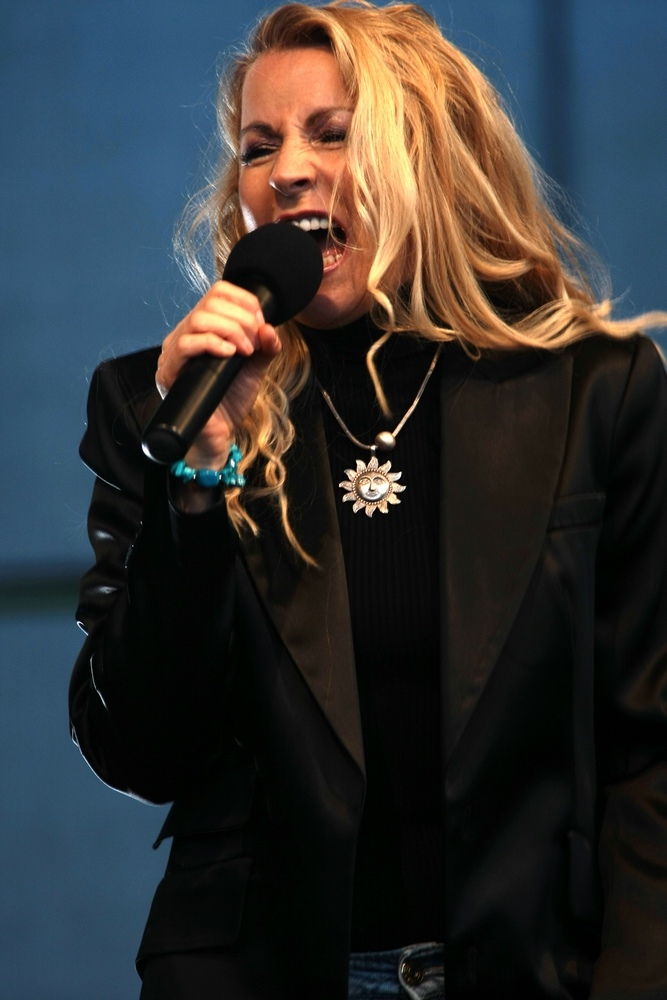

Background information
- Also known as: Dana, Dana Harris, Jobel, Joelle, Josy
- Born: Josephine Hiebel; December 8, 1962 (age 63)
- Origin: Hamburg, Germany
- Genres: Hi-NRG, Euro disco, house
- Occupations: Singer, songwriter
- Years active: 1979–present

Josephine Hiebel (born December 8, 1962), known by the stage name Lian Ross, is a German hi-NRG/Euro disco singer.

== Career ==
She started her career by recording songs with producer Luis Rodriguez, whom she married later.

She has recorded successful covers such as Sylvester's "Do You Wanna Funk" and Modern Talking's "You're My Heart, You're My Soul". Her original hit songs include "Say You'll Never", "Fantasy", and "Scratch My Name", among others. A compilation of her hit singles, The Best of and More was released in 2005. Singles in the 2000s include "Never Gonna Lose" released on ZYX Records in Germany on December 27, 2005, and a version of "Young Hearts Run Free" released on Blanco y Negro in Spain on September 9, 2009.

She also provided vocals to many projects with her husband Luis Rodriguez, including Fun Factory, Creative Connection, Josy, Jobel, and Dana Harris.

== Discography ==
=== Albums ===
Released	Title	Pseudonym	Label	Country
1995	Enjoy	Tears n' Joy	Luiggi Records	Spain
1998	Oh La La La	2 Eivissa	Control	Germany
1998	Neuer Kurs	Negakuss	Marlboro Music	Germany
1999	Next Generation	Fun Factory	Marlboro Music	Europe
1999	Next Generation (Japanese Deluxe Edition)	Fun Factory	Victor	Japan
2002	ABC of Music	Fun Factory	Victor	Japan
2003	Are You Ready?	2 Eivissa	Blanco y Negro	Spain
2004	The Best Of...And More	Lian Ross	ZYX Music	Germany
2008	Maxi-Singles Collection Vol. 1	Lian Ross	ESonCD	Russia
2008	Maxi-Singles Collection Vol. 2	Lian Ross	ESonCD	Russia
2013	I Got the Beat	Lian Ross	Weiss Records	Spain
2016	Greatest Hits & Remixes	Lian Ross	ZYX Music	Germany
2016	And the Beat Goes On	Lian Ross	Team 33 Music	Spain
2020	3L	Lian Ross	Team 33 Music	Spain
2023	4You	Lian Ross	Team 33 Music	Spain

=== Singles ===
Released	Title	Label
1985	"Fantasy"/"Saturday Night"	ZYX Records
1985	"Say You'll Never"/"I Need a Friend"	ZYX Records
1986	"It's Up to You"	Arrow Records
1986	"Neverending Love "Rap""/"Neverending Love "Song""	Arrow Records
1987	"Do You Wanna Funk"/"Magic Moment"	Chic
1987	"Oh Won't You Tell Me"/"Reach Out"	Chic
1988	"Say Say Say"	Polydor
1989	"Feel So Good"	Polydor
1993	"Fantasy '93"/"Trying to Forget You"	Almighty Records
1994	"I Will Die for Love"	Unreleased track
1994	"Keep This Feeling"	Polydor
1996	"When I Look into Your Eyes"	Unreleased track
1998	"Fantasy '98"	ZYX Music
1998	"Fantasy (Remix)"	ZYX Music
2004	"Fantasy 2004"	Dance Street Records
2005	"I Wanna"	House Nation
2005	"Never Gonna Lose"	ZYX Music
2007	"On the Road Again"	Storm
2009	"Young Hearts Run Free"	Blanco y Negro
2012	"Minnie the Moocher"	Blanco y Negro
2013	"Say You'll Never 2013" (promo only)	Team 33 Music
2014	"Get Closer" (duet with David Tavaré)	Team 33 Music
2014	"All We Need Is Love" (feat. TQ)	ZYX Music
2014	"Good Feeling Power" (feat. Big Daddi)	Team 33 Music
2015	"You're My Heart, You're My Soul 2015" (feat. Big Daddi)	Team 33 Music
2016	"Everything Is Possible"	Team 33 Music
2017	"Dr. Mabuse"	Team 33 Music
2017	"Viva La Paz"	Team 33 Music
2017	"Amazing Grace"	Team 33 Music
2018	"I Still Love You"	Team 33 Music
2018	"Davai Davai" (feat. 2 Eivissa)	Team 33 Music
2018	"Viva La Paz" (feat. Pedro Marcelo)	Team 33 Music
2019	"Casanova"	Team 33 Music
2019	"Young Forever"	Team 33 Music
2021	"Summerwine" (feat. Fancy)	Team 33 Music
2022	"Moving On" (feat. Dr. Alban / Admiral C4C)	Team 33 Music
2022	"Can You Love Me"	Team 33 Music
2023	"Live Forever"	Team 33 Music
2023	"My Love"	Team 33 Music
2023	"Take My Hand"	Team 33 Music
2023	"Te Amo"	Team 33 Music
2023	"Freedom"	Team 33 Music
2024	"Fantasy" (Radio Edit)	Team 33 Music
2024	"Disco Queen" (Remix)	Team 33 Music

=== Duets, featured performances, collaborations ===
Released	Title	Artist	Album
2007	"König"	Matthias Reim feat. Lian Ross	Männer sind Krieger
2008	"A Chi Mi Dice"	Bino feat. Jobel	Emozioni
2008	"Solo Tú"	David Tavaré feat. Lian Ross	La Vida Viene Y Va
2008	"La Vita é Bella"	Oliver Lukas feat. Lian Ross	Für Dich
2012	"Liebe"	Oliver Lukas feat. Lian Ross	Seiltänzer
2013	"Am Fenster"	Matthias Reim	Unendlich
2015	"Dale Duro"	Tapo & Raya feat. 2 Eivissa	
2015	"Viernes Tarde"	Tanny Mas feat. Lian Ross	True Illusions
2021	"Summerwine"	Lian Ross feat. Fancy	

=== Singles (under pseudonyms) ===
Released	Title	Pseudonym	Label
1981	"I Know"/"Gimme More"	Josy	TELDEC
1982	"Do the Rock"/"What'd You Say"	Josy	TELDEC
1983	"Mama Say"/"Stop and Go"	Josy	TELDEC
1984	"Magic"/"Who Said You're the One"	Josy	Master Records
1985	"Tengo Tengo"	Chicano	TELDEC
1985	"Scratch My Name"/"Baby I'm on My Way"	Creative Connection	Chic
1985	"Call My Name"/"I'm on My Way"	Creative Connection	Chic
1985	"You're My Heart, You're My Soul"/"Dancing to the Beat"	Creative Connection	TELDEC
1985	"Mañana"/"Hey Mr. DJ"	Loco Loco	Constant
1986	"Don't You Go Away"/"That E-Motion"	Creative Connection	Arrow Records
1988	"Viva El Amor"	Don Luis Y Compania	WEA
1990	"My World Is Empty without You"/"I Need You by My Side"	Dana Harris	WEA Musik GmbH
1991	"Bacardi Feeling (Summer Dreaming)"	Divina	Control
1992	"Jimmy Mack"/"Is It Good to You"	Dana	RCA
1992	"Rhythm Is a Dancer"	Key Biscayne	Polystar
1992	"I Love Your Smile"	Shona	Control
1992	"Gimme Gimme Gimme"/"Summernight City"	Stockholm Underground	Control
1993	"All That She Wants"	Bass of Spades	Ultrapop
1993	"Wheel of Fortune"	Bass of Spades	Ultrapop
1993	"Teenage Revolution"	Divina	Ultrapop
1993	"Feel It"	Hi-Q	DJ's Delight
1993	"Go Before You Break My Heart"/"Brand New"	Tears n' Joy	RCA
1993	"I Will Always Love You"/"Let's Groove Tonight"	Tears n' Joy	RCA
1994	"You Got to Be Strong"	Avant Garde	DJ's Delight
1994	"Let's Go to Heaven"	Hi-Q	DJ's Delight
1995	"Can You Imagine?"	Exotica	Dance Pool
1995	"Upside Down"	Joelle	BMG
1995	"Take My Life"	Tears n' Joy	Luiggi Records
1996	"Boom Boom Boom"	Boom Boom Club	ROD Records
1996	"Another World"	DJ Pierro	Maad Records
1996	"I Want Your Sex"	Exotica	Dance Pool
1996	"Celebrate"	Happy House	ROD Records
1996	"How Deep Is Your Love"/"I Wanna Dance with Somebody"	Jay Jay	MCA Records
1996	"Let Me Dream Forever"	Joelle	unreleased track
1996	"We Got to Move"	Teeko X	Club Tools
1996	"Killing Me Softly"	Teeko X feat. Rod D.	Club Tools
1997	"I Fear"	Dreamscape	Eastwest Records GmbH
1998	"Move Your Body (Tu Tu Tu Tu Ta, Oh La)"	2 Eivissa	Control
1998	"This Must Be Love"	Joelle	BMG
1999	"Bad Girl"	2 Eivissa	Blanco y Negro
1999	"I Wanna Be Your Toy"	2 Eivissa	Polydor
1999	"2 Funky"	2 Funky	Marlboro Music
1999	"If You Believe"	Cherry	Marlboro Music
1999	"House of Love"/"Get the Rhythm"/"Next to You"	Fun Factory	Victor
1999	"Sha-La-La-La-La"	Fun Factory	Marlboro Music
1999	"Wish"	Fun Factory	Marlboro Music
1999	"Hambubas"	Negakuss	Marlboro Music
1999	"Das Leben Ist Nich Leicht"	Negakuss	Marlboro Music
2000	"Viva La Fiesta"	2 Eivissa	Blanco y Negro
2001	"El Pelotón"	2 Eivissa	Blanco y Negro
2002	"Meaning of My Life"	2 Eivissa	Blanco y Negro
2002	"Suddenly"	Dana Harris	DA Records
2002	"I Need Your Love"	Pierro feat. Joelle	EMI
2003	"Boy Are You Ready"	2 Eivissa	House Nation
2003	"Fire in the Sky"	2 Eivissa	House Nation
2003	"I Would Die for Love"	Exotica	Limite Records / Bit Music
2004	"Hey Boy"	2 Eivissa	House Nation
2004	"What Is Love?"	Exotica	Limite Records / Bit Music
2005	"Amigo"	2 Eivissa	Blanco y Negro
2016	"Allez Allez! Je veux que vous dansez"	2 Eivissa ft. El Tapo	Team 33 Music

== Videos ==
- 1984 – Magic
- 1984 – You Light Up My Life
- 1985 – Fantasy (Live at Formel Eins)
- 1986 – Neverending Love
- 1987 – Oh, Won't You Tell Me
- 1988 – Say, Say, Say
- 1989 – Say, Say, Say (Die Spielbude: Mic Mac)
- 1989 – Feel So Good (1st version)
- 1989 – Feel So Good (2nd version)
- 1990 – My World Is Empty Without You
- 1996 – Upside Down
- 1996 – Upside Down (Live at DanceHaus)
- 1999 – I Wanna Be Your Toy
- 2004 – Say You'll Never (Discoteka 80's)
- 2004 – Scratch My Name (Discoteka 80's)
- 2014 – All We Need Is Love (feat. TQ)
- 2015 – You're My Heart, You're My Soul (feat. Big Daddi)
- 2015 – Viernes Tarde (Tanny Mas feat. Lian Ross)
- 2015 – Dale Duro (Tapo & Raya feat. 2 Eivissa)
- 2016 – Allez Allez! Je veux que vous dansez (2 Eivissa feat. El Tapo)
- 2016 – Game Of Love (feat. Mode One)
