= Victory (Modern Talking album) =

2002 album by Modern Talking

Studio album by Modern Talking
- Released: 18 March 2002
- Recorded: 2001
- Genre: Eurodance
- Length: 55:01
- Label: Hansa
- Producer: Dieter Bohlen; Axel Breitung; Thorsten Brötzmann; Lalo Titenkov; Kay M. Nickold; Werner Becker

Modern Talking chronology
America (2001)	Victory (2002)	Universe (2003)

Singles from Victory
- 1. "Ready for the Victory" Released: 18 February 2002; 2. "Juliet" Released: 29 April 2002

Professional ratings
Review scores
Source	Rating
laut.de	2/5 stars
Muzykalnaya Gazeta	Mixed

Victory is the eleventh studio album by German duo Modern Talking, released on 18 March 2002 by Hansa Records. Two singles were released from the album, "Ready for the Victory" and "Juliet", which charted at numbers seven and 25 in Germany, respectively. Victory debuted at number one on the German Albums Chart on 1 April 2002, spending four weeks within the top 10 and 15 weeks altogether on chart. The album has been certified gold by the Bundesverband Musikindustrie (BVMI), denoting shipments in excess of 150,000 units in Germany.

== Track listing ==
All tracks are written by Dieter Bohlen, except "Love to Love You" by Thomas Anders.

No.	Title	Length
1.	"Ready for the Victory"	3:31
2.	"I'm Gonna Be Strong"	3:30
3.	"Don't Make Me Blue"	3:52
4.	"Juliet"	3:37
5.	"Higher Than Heaven"	3:33
6.	"You're Not Lisa"	3:05
7.	"When the Sky Rained Fire"	3:41
8.	"Summer in December"	3:36
9.	"10 Seconds to Countdown"	3:20
10.	"Love to Love You"	3:29
11.	"Blue Eyed Coloured Girl"	4:13
12.	"We Are the Children of the World"	3:16
13.	"Mrs. Robota"	3:27
14.	"If I..."	4:50
15.	"Who Will Love You Like I Do"	4:01

== Personnel ==
- Dieter Bohlen – production
- Axel Breitung – co-production, arrangements (tracks 1, 7, 9)
- Thorsten Brötzmann – co-production, arrangements (tracks 2, 4, 12, 13, 15)
- Lalo Titenkov – co-production, arrangements (tracks 8, 10, 11, 14)
- Kay M. Nickold – co-production, arrangements (track 5)
- Werner Becker – co-production, arrangements (tracks 3, 6)
- Manfred Esser – photos
- Stephan Pick – photos
- Ronald Reinsberg – artwork

== Charts ==
=== Weekly charts ===
Weekly chart performance for Victory
Chart (2002)	Peak position
Austrian Albums (Ö3 Austria)	7
Czech Albums (ČNS IFPI)	18
European Albums (Music & Media)	9
German Albums (Offizielle Top 100)	1
Hungarian Albums (MAHASZ)	10
Polish Albums (ZPAV)	14
Swiss Albums (Schweizer Hitparade)	14

=== Year-end charts ===
Year-end chart performance for Victory
Chart (2002)	Position
German Albums (Offizielle Top 100)	43

== Certifications ==
Certifications for Victory
Region	Certification	Certified units/sales
Germany (BVMI)	Gold	150,000^{^}
^{^} Shipments figures based on certification alone.
