= Don't Worry (Modern Talking song) =

Single by Modern Talking

from the album Romantic Warriors
- B-side: "Blinded by Your Love"
- Released: 1987
- Recorded: 1987
- Genre: Synth-pop
- Length: 3:31
- Label: Hansa
- Songwriter(s): Dieter Bohlen
- Producer(s): Dieter Bohlen; Luis Rodríguez

Modern Talking singles chronology
"Jet Airliner" (1987)	"Don't Worry" (1987)	"In 100 Years..." (1987)

Audio video
- "Don't Worry" on YouTube

"Don't Worry" is a song by German pop duo Modern Talking from their fifth studio album, Romantic Warriors. It was released in 1987 as a single in Spain only, where it peaked at number 25.

== Track listing ==
- 7″ single (Hansa 109 436)
1. "Don't Worry" – 3:34
2. "Blinded by Your Love" – 4:00
- 12″ single (Hansa 609 436)
1. "Don't Worry" – 3:34
2. "Romantic Warriors" – 3:58
3. "Blinded by Your Love" – 4:00

== Charts ==
Chart performance for "Don't Worry"
Chart (1987)	Peak position
Spain (AFYVE)	25
