= Universe (Modern Talking album) =

Studio album by Modern Talking
- Released: 31 March 2003
- Recorded: 2002
- Genre: Eurodance
- Length: 44:11
- Label: Hansa
- Producer: Dieter Bohlen; Thorsten Brötzmann; Kay M. Nickold; Lalo Titenkov; Jeo

Modern Talking chronology
Victory (2002)	Universe (2003)	The Final Album: The Ultimate Best Of (2003)

Singles from Universe
- 1. "TV Makes the Superstar" Released: 3 March 2003

Professional ratings
Review scores
Source	Rating
AllMusic	2.5/5 stars
laut.de	1/5 stars

Universe is the twelfth and final studio album by German duo Modern Talking, released on 31 March 2003 by Hansa Records. The album debuted at number two on the German chart on 14 April 2003, spending three weeks within the top 10 and 12 weeks altogether on the chart. Universe has been certified gold by the Bundesverband Musikindustrie (BVMI) for shipping over 100,000 units in Germany.

== Track listing ==
All tracks are written by Dieter Bohlen.

No.	Title	Producer(s)	Length
1.	"TV Makes the Superstar"	Bohlen; Thorsten Brötzmann^{[a]}	3:44
2.	"I'm No Rockefeller"	Bohlen; Brötzmann^{[a]}	3:40
3.	"Mystery"	Bohlen; Kay M. Nickold^{[a]}	3:32
4.	"Everybody Needs Somebody"	Bohlen; Jeo^{[a]}; Lalo Titenkov^{[a]}	4:09
5.	"Heart of an Angel"	Bohlen; Jeo^{[a]}; Titenkov^{[a]}	4:08
6.	"Who Will Be There"	Bohlen; Nickold^{[a]}	3:47
7.	"Knocking on My Door"	Bohlen; Jeo^{[a]}; Titenkov^{[a]}	3:36
8.	"Should I, Would I, Could I"	Bohlen; Jeo^{[a]}; Titenkov^{[a]}	3:45
9.	"Blackbird"	Bohlen; Jeo^{[a]}; Titenkov^{[a]}	3:17
10.	"Life Is Too Short"	Bohlen; Brötzmann^{[a]}	3:32
11.	"Nothing but the Truth"	Bohlen; Nickold^{[a]}	3:20
12.	"Superstar"	Bohlen; Nickold^{[a]}	3:41

=== Notes ===
- ^{^[a]} signifies a co-producer

== Charts ==
=== Weekly charts ===
Weekly chart performance for Universe
Chart (2003)	Peak position
Austrian Albums (Ö3 Austria)	10
Czech Albums (ČNS IFPI)	19
European Albums (Music & Media)	11
German Albums (Offizielle Top 100)	2
Hungarian Albums (MAHASZ)	24
Polish Albums (ZPAV)	20
Swiss Albums (Schweizer Hitparade)	25

=== Year-end charts ===
Year-end chart performance for Universe
Chart (2003)	Position
German Albums (Offizielle Top 100)	66

== Certifications ==
Certifications for Universe
Region	Certification	Certified units/sales
Germany (BVMI)	Gold	100,000^{^}
^{^} Shipments figures based on certification alone.
