= Geronimo's Cadillac (Modern Talking song) =

1986 single by Modern Talking

Single by Modern Talking

from the album In the Middle of Nowhere
- B-side: "Keep Love Alive"
- Released: 6 October 1986
- Recorded: June 1986
- Length: 3:16
- Label: Hansa
- Songwriter(s): Dieter Bohlen
- Producer(s): Dieter Bohlen; Luis Rodríguez

Modern Talking singles chronology
"Atlantis Is Calling (S.O.S. for Love)" (1986)	"Geronimo's Cadillac" (1986)	"Give Me Peace on Earth" (1986)

Music video
- "Geronimo's Cadillac" on YouTube

"Geronimo's Cadillac" is a song by German pop duo Modern Talking from their fourth studio album, In the Middle of Nowhere (1986). It was released as the album's lead single on 6 October 1986 in Germany and other European territories. It was their first single not to reach the top of the German Single Chart, peaking at number three on 3 November 1986, almost a month after its release. It spent five weeks within the top 10 and a total of 13 weeks on the top 100 in Germany. "Geronimo's Cadillac" also entered the top five in Austria and the top 10 in Switzerland, Sweden and Norway.

== Track listings ==
- 7-inch single
1. "Geronimo's Cadillac" – 3:12
2. "Geronimo's Cadillac" (Instrumental) – 3:12
- 12-inch maxi single
1. "Geronimo's Cadillac" (Long Vocal Version) – 5:02
2. "Keep Love Alive" – 3:25
3. "Geronimo's Cadillac" (Instrumental Version) – 3:12
4. "Geronimo's Cadillac" (Extended Version) - 8:41
- Other versions
1. "Geronimo's Cadillac" (1998 version) – 3:10
  Included on the album Back for Good
2. "Geronimo's Cadillac" (2017 version) – 3:22
  Included on the album Back for Gold: The New Versions

== Charts ==
=== Weekly charts ===
Weekly chart performance for "Geronimo's Cadillac"
Chart (1986–1987)	Peak position
Austria (Ö3 Austria Top 40)	3
Belgium (Ultratop 50 Flanders)	4
Denmark (IFPI)	3
Europe (European Hot 100 Singles)	17
Finland (Suomen virallinen lista)	3
France (SNEP)	43
Greece (IFPI)	1
Italy (Musica e dischi)	23
Netherlands (Dutch Top 40)	36
Netherlands (Single Top 100)	24
Norway (VG-lista)	7
South Africa (Springbok Radio)	4
Spain (AFYVE)	1
Sweden (Sverigetopplistan)	6
Switzerland (Schweizer Hitparade)	6
West Germany (GfK)	3

=== Year-end charts ===
Year-end chart performance for "Geronimo's Cadillac"
Chart (1986)	Position
Belgium (Ultratop 50 Flanders)	46
Greece (IFPI)	10
Spain (AFYVE)	4
