= China in Her Eyes =

"China In Her Eyes"

Single by Modern Talking

from the album Year of the Dragon
- Released: 31 January 2000
- Genre: Eurodance
- Length: 3:46
- Label: BMG; Ariola
- Songwriter: Dieter Bohlen
- Producers: Dieter Bohlen; Luis Rodríguez

Modern Talking singles chronology
"Sexy, Sexy Lover" (1999)	"China In Her Eyes" (2000)	"Don't Take Away My Heart" (2000)

Music video
- "China in Her Eyes" ft. Eric Singleton on YouTube

"China in Her Eyes" is a song by German music group Modern Talking and featuring American rapper Eric Singleton. It was released in January 2000 as the first single from the ninth studio album Year of the Dragon. Although, the song was of moderate success outside of Germany peaking only at No. 20 in Switzerland, No. 22 in Austria and No. 26 in Sweden, it managed to peak at No. 8 at the duo's home of Germany where it spent total of nine weeks on the single chart.

== Track listing ==
CD-Maxi Hansa 74321 72297 2 (BMG) / EAN 0743217229726 31.01.2000

1. "China In Her Eyes" (Video Version) - 3:09
2. "China In Her Eyes" (Vocal Version) - 3:46
3. "China In Her Eyes" (Extended Video Version) - 4:49
4. "China In Her Eyes" (Remix) - 4:25

== Charts ==
Weekly chart rankings for "China in Her Eyes"
Chart (2000)	Peak position
Austria (Ö3 Austria Top 40)	22
Germany (GfK)	8
Spain (AFYVE)	6
Sweden (Sverigetopplistan)	26
Switzerland (Schweizer Hitparade)	20

Annual chart rankings for "China in Her Eyes"
Chart (2000)	Rank
European Airplay (Border Breakers)	83
