= TV Makes the Superstar =

Single by Modern Talking

from the album Universe
- Released: 3 March 2003
- Genre: Electronic rock; synth-pop
- Length: 3:44
- Label: BMG
- Songwriter(s): Dieter Bohlen
- Producer(s): Dieter Bohlen; Thorsten Brötzmann

Modern Talking singles chronology
"Juliet" (2002)	"TV Makes the Superstar" (2003)

Music video
- "TV Makes the Superstar" on YouTube

"TV Makes the Superstar" is the lead and only single from Modern Talking's 2003 album, Universe, and also the band's last single release.

== Track listing ==
- CD maxi single (Hansa 82876 50814 2 (BMG) / EAN 0828765081429)
1. "TV Makes the Superstar" (radio edit) – 3:44
2. "TV Makes the Superstar" (extended) – 5:05
3. "TV Makes the Superstar" (instrumental) – 3:44
4. "Blackbird" – 3:17

== Credits ==
- Lead vocals: Thomas Anders
- Choir: Christoph Leisbendorff and William King
- Lyrics and music: Dieter Bohlen
- Keyboards: Thorsten Brötzmann, Jeo and Michael Knauer
- Guitars: Peter Weihe
- Mix: Jeo @Jeopark

== Charts ==
=== Weekly charts ===
Weekly chart performance for "TV Makes the Superstar"
Chart (2003)	Peak position
Austria (Ö3 Austria Top 40)	15
Germany (GfK)	2
Hungary (Single Top 40)	4
Romania (Romanian Top 100)	44
Switzerland (Schweizer Hitparade)	55

=== Year-end charts ===
Year-end chart performance for "TV Makes the Superstar"
Chart (2003)	Position
Germany (Media Control GfK)	41
