= Sexy, Sexy Lover =

Single by Modern Talking

from the album Alone
- Released: 17 May 1999
- Genre: Dance-pop
- Length: 3:33
- Label: BMG; Ariola
- Songwriters: Dieter Bohlen; Eric Singleton (rap version)
- Producers: Dieter Bohlen; Luis Rodríguez

Modern Talking singles chronology
"You Are Not Alone" (1999)	"Sexy, Sexy Lover" (1999)	"China in Her Eyes" (2000)

Music video
- "Sexy, Sexy Lover" on YouTube

"Sexy, Sexy Lover" is the second single from the Modern Talking eighth album, Alone. The song features rapper Eric Singleton in music video and single.

== Track listing ==
CD-maxi

1. "Sexy Sexy Lover" (Rap Version) – 3:10
2. "Sexy Sexy Lover" (Vocal Version) – 3:33
1. "Sexy Sexy Lover" (Extended Rap Version) – 4:59
2. "Just Close Your Eyes" – 4:17

CD single

1. "Sexy Sexy Lover" (Rap Version) – 3:10
2. "Sexy Sexy Lover" (Vocal Version) – 3:33

== Chart positions ==
Chart (1999)	Peak position
Austria (Ö3 Austria Top 40)	27
Europe (Eurochart Hot 100)	69
Finland (Suomen virallinen lista)	9
Germany (GfK)	15
Spain (AFYVE)	19
Sweden (Sverigetopplistan)	25
Switzerland (Schweizer Hitparade)	35
