= You Are Not Alone (Modern Talking song) =

Single by Modern Talking

from the album Alone
- Released: 1 February 1999
- Genre: Eurodance; Dance-pop
- Length: 3:45
- Label: BMG; Ariola
- Songwriters: Dieter Bohlen; Eric Singleton (rap version)
- Producers: Dieter Bohlen; Luis Rodríguez

Modern Talking singles chronology
| "We Take the Chance" (1998) | "You Are Not Alone" (1999) | "Sexy, Sexy Lover" (1999) |

Music video
- "You Are Not Alone" ft. Eric Singleton on YouTube

"You Are Not Alone" is Modern Talking's first single released off their eighth album Alone. It was released in Germany and in other European Territories on February 1, 1999.

== Background ==
In Germany, the single peaked at No. 7 on March 8, 1999, over a month after its release date. "You Are Not Alone" spent five weeks within the German single chart and total of 15 weeks on the top-100, it eventually reached a gold status for shipping over 250,000 in Germany alone.

While, "You Are Not Alone" entered the top-20 in Switzerland, France, Sweden, it managed to enter the top-10 in Finland and the top-5 in Austria and Norway.

== Single release ==
CD-Maxi Hansa 74321 63800 2 (BMG) / EAN 0743216380022 01.02.1999

| No. | Title | "Length |
|---|---|---|
| 1. | You Are Not Alone (Video Version) | 3:23 |
| 2. | You Are Not Alone (Radio Edit) | 3:41 |
| 3. | You Are Not Alone (Extended Version) | 4:55 |
| 4. | You Are Not Alone (Remix) | 4:32 |
| 5. | Space Mix (Radio Edit) | 4:31 |

== Charts ==
=== Weekly charts ===
Weekly chart performance for "You Are Not Alone"
| Chart (1999) | Peak position |
|---|---|
| Austria (Ö3 Austria Top 40) | 5 |
| Europe (Eurochart Hot 100) | 19 |
| Finland (Suomen virallinen lista) | 8 |
| France (SNEP) | 13 |
| Germany (GfK) | 7 |
| Norway (VG-lista) | 4 |
| Spain (AFYVE) | 5 |
| Sweden (Sverigetopplistan) | 15 |
| Switzerland (Schweizer Hitparade) | 12 |

=== Year-end charts ===
Year-end chart performance for "You Are Not Alone"
| Chart (1999) | Position |
|---|---|
| Europe Border Breakers (Music & Media) | 51 |
| France (SNEP) | 93 |
| Germany (Media Control) | 56 |
| Sweden (Hitlistan) | 93 |
