= Juliet (Modern Talking song) =

Single by Modern Talking

from the album Victory
- Released: 29 April 2002
- Genre: Europop
- Length: 3:37
- Label: BMG; Ariola
- Songwriter(s): Dieter Bohlen
- Producer(s): Dieter Bohlen; Thorsten Brötzmann

Modern Talking singles chronology
"Ready for the Victory" (2002)	"Juliet" (2002)	"TV Makes the Superstar" (2003)

Music video
- "Juliet" on YouTube

"Juliet" is the second single from Modern Talking's eleventh album, Victory. Unlike other Modern Talking tracks released previously, the song has a disco flavour to it and refers to Alicia Bridges's 1978 song "I Love the Nightlife".

== Track listing ==
- CD maxi single (Hansa 74321 93836 2 (BMG) / EAN 0743219383624)
1. "Juliet" – 3:37
2. "Juliet" (Jeo's remix) – 5:05
3. "Higher Than Heaven" (U-Max mix) – 3:40
4. "Down on My Knees" – 3:42

== Charts ==
Chart performance for "Juliet"
Chart (2002)	Peak position
Austria (Ö3 Austria Top 40)	42
Belgium (Ultratip Bubbling Under Flanders)	4
Germany (GfK)	25
Hungary (Single Top 40)	17
Romania (Romanian Top 100)	72
Switzerland (Schweizer Hitparade)	83
