= Jet Airliner (Modern Talking song) =

1987 single by Modern Talking

Single by Modern Talking

from the album Romantic Warriors
- Released: 18 May 1987
- Recorded: February 1987
- Genre: Synth-pop
- Length: 4:21
- Label: Hansa
- Songwriter(s): Dieter Bohlen
- Producer(s): Dieter Bohlen; Luis Rodríguez

Modern Talking singles chronology
"Lonely Tears in Chinatown" (1986)	"Jet Airliner" (1987)	"Don't Worry" (1987)

Audio video
- "Jet Airliner" on YouTube

"Jet Airliner" is a song by German pop duo Modern Talking from their fifth studio album, Romantic Warriors. It was released as the album's lead single on 18 May 1987 in Germany and in other European territories. "Jet Airliner" peaked at number 7 in Germany on 22 June 1987, spending four weeks within the top 10 and total of 11 weeks on the singles chart. While the single managed to enter the top 10 in Austria, it entered the top 20 in Switzerland and Sweden, and peaked at number 33 in the Netherlands.

== Track listing ==
- 7-inch single
1. "Jet Airliner" – 4:16
2. "Jet Airliner" (instrumental) – 3:50
- 12-inch maxi single
1. "Jet Airliner" (Fasten-Seat-Belt-mix) – 5:53
2. "Jet Airliner" (instrumental) – 3:50
3. "Jet Airliner" – 4:16

== Charts ==
=== Weekly charts ===
Chart (1987)	Peak position
Austria (Ö3 Austria Top 40)	10
Belgium (Ultratop 50 Flanders)	13
Europe (European Hot 100 Singles)	23
Italy Airplay (Music & Media)	7
Netherlands (Dutch Top 40)	36
Netherlands (Single Top 100)	33
South Africa (Springbok Radio)	16
Spain (AFYVE)	3
Sweden (Sverigetopplistan)	12
Switzerland (Schweizer Hitparade)	12
West Germany (GfK)	7
