= Give Me Peace on Earth =

1986 single by Modern Talking

Single by Modern Talking

from the album In the Middle of Nowhere
- B-side: "Stranded in the Middle of Nowhere"
- Released: 11 November 1986
- Recorded: July 1986
- Length: 4:12
- Label: Hansa
- Songwriter(s): Dieter Bohlen
- Producer(s): Dieter Bohlen; Luis Rodríguez

Modern Talking singles chronology
"Geronimo's Cadillac" (1986)	"Give Me Peace on Earth" (1986)	"Lonely Tears in Chinatown" (1986)

Audio video
- "Give Me Peace on Earth" on YouTube

"Give Me Peace on Earth" is a song by German pop duo Modern Talking from their fourth album, In the Middle of Nowhere (1986). It was released as the album's second single on 11 November 1986, peaking at No. 29 in Germany and No. 28 in Austria.

== Track listings ==
- 7" single
1. "Give Me Peace on Earth" – 4:12
2. "Stranded in the Middle of Nowhere" – 4:31
- 12-inch maxi single
1. "Give Me Peace on Earth" – 4:12
2. "Stranded in the Middle of Nowhere" – 4:31
3. "Sweet Little Sheila" – 3:04

== Charts ==
Chart performance for "Give Me Peace on Earth"
Chart (1987)	Peak position
Austria (Ö3 Austria Top 40)	28
Belgium (Ultratop 50 Flanders)	15
Europe (European Hot 100 Singles)	69
South Africa (Springbok Radio)	28
West Germany (GfK)	29
