= Last Exit to Brooklyn (song) =

Single by Modern Talking

from the album America
- Released: 7 May 2001
- Genre: Europop
- Length: 3:16
- Label: BMG; Ariola
- Songwriter: Dieter Bohlen
- Producers: Dieter Bohlen; Axel Breitung

Modern Talking singles chronology
"Win the Race" (2001)	"Last Exit to Brooklyn" (2001)	"Ready for the Victory" (2002)

Music video
- "Last Exit to Brooklyn" on YouTube

"Last Exit to Brooklyn" is a song by German pop duo Modern Talking, featuring American rapper Eric Singleton. The single was released on 7 May 2001, and experienced moderate success; it spent five weeks on the German singles chart, peaking at number 41. "Last Exit to Brooklyn" charted similarly in Austria, peaking at number 44, and reached number 94 in Switzerland. The single was more successful in Russia, where it peaked at number 7.

== Track listing ==
- CD maxi single (Hansa 74321 85979 2 (BMG) / EAN 0743218597923)
1. "Last Exit to Brooklyn" (radio edit) – 3:16
2. "Last Exit to Brooklyn" (rap version) – 2:46
3. "Last Exit to Brooklyn" (extended version) – 5:28
4. "Last Exit to Brooklyn" (vocal remix) – 4:58
5. "Last Exit to Brooklyn" (rap remix) – 4:59

== Charts ==
Chart performance for "Last Exit to Brooklyn"
Chart (2001)	Peak position
Austria (Ö3 Austria Top 40)	44
Germany (GfK)	37
Poland Airplay (Music & Media)	10
Switzerland (Schweizer Hitparade)	94
