= In 100 Years... =

Single by Modern Talking

from the album In the Garden of Venus
- Released: 9 November 1987
- Recorded: May 1987
- Genre: Synth-pop
- Length: 3:57
- Label: BMG; Ariola
- Songwriter: Dieter Bohlen
- Producers: Dieter Bohlen; Luis Rodríguez

Modern Talking singles chronology
"Don't Worry" (1987)	"In 100 Years..." (1987)	"You're My Heart, You're My Soul '98" (1998)

Audio video
- "In 100 Years..." on YouTube

"In 100 Years..." is a song by German music pop group Modern Talking. It was released on 9 November 1987 on Ariola. The track is the only single from the band's sixth album, In the Garden of Venus. It was the duo's final release before their split later that year.

== Lyrics and music ==
"In 100 Years..." is about a person who believes that the current lack of empathy and understanding may lead to a dystopian future in which feelings, including love, are illegal, and in which expressions of romance and humanity will be only a distant memory.

The song features dialogue samples from Richard Burton's spoken introduction to "The Eve of the War" from Jeff Wayne's Musical Version of The War of the Worlds album:

- "Last years of the 19th century" - all versions
- "Minds immeasurably superior to ours" - Part 2 and long version
- "Timeless worlds of space" - Part 2
- "Mars" - Part 2 and long version
- "The possibility of life on other planets" - long version
- "Scrutinised" - Part 2

Part 2 and the long version also feature additional dialogue by Richard Burton from other tracks from the same album: "Boxes and bundles" from "Forever Autumn", "Territory" and "Good heavens" from "Brave New World" (Part 2 only); and "People loved you and trusted you" by Julie Covington from track "The Spirit of Man".

== Critical reception ==
A review in the pan-European magazine Music & Media stated: "How Dieter Bohlen does it is a puzzle, but each time he manages to come up with a synthesizer-based pop song that is brutally commercial and exploits the hookline to the very extreme".

== Track listing ==
- 12″ maxi single (Hansa 609 543)
1. "In 100 Years..." (long version – Future mix) – 6:39
2. "In 100 Years..." (part I) – 3:58
3. "In 100 Years..." (part II) – 4:06
- 7″ single (Hansa 109 543)
1. "In 100 Years..." (part 1) – 3:58
2. "In 100 Years..." (part 2) – 4:06

== Charts ==
Chart performance for "In 100 Years..."
Chart (1987)	Peak position
Germany (GfK)	30
Spain (AFYVE)	4
South Africa (Springbok Radio)	16
