= Eric Singleton =

American rapper

Eric XL Singleton
- Born: Eric Newkirt Singleton; November 6, 1968 (age 57); New York City, U.S.
- Genres: Hip hop; dance
- Occupations: Rapper; songwriter
- Years active: 1994–2001
- Label: BMG

Eric Newkirt Singleton (born November 6, 1968), also known as Eric XL Singleton or XLarge, is an American former rapper who has appeared on many dance music productions, significantly on Modern Talking songs, such as "You're My Heart, You're My Soul '98", "Space Mix '98", "Brother Louie '98", "You Are Not Alone", "Sexy Sexy Lover", "China in Her Eyes", "Don't Take Away My Heart" and "Last Exit to Brooklyn".

== Biography ==
Singleton was born in New York City. Since 1994, he has worked with different music producers. He worked with unknown bands in Germany, like Face II Face, Deep Down and Cool Cut. He gained fame mainly through his appearances as rapper for Modern Talking. He appeared for the first time on the comeback version of "You're My Heart, You're My Soul" in 1998, then for the next few years he was heard on every single Modern Talking song released, until "Last Exit to Brooklyn" in 2001 (except "Win the Race"). In 2000, he released his first solo single, "Sexy Girl", featuring Shaggy.
