= Ambrogio Crotti =

Italian composer

Ambrogio Crotti (also known as "Amadeus") is an Italian musician, arranger, composer and producer.

== Biography ==
After a long life as a musician touring around the world, he started his studio career in Studio 33 in Hamburg, Germany, where he worked together with Luis Rodriguez and Dieter Bohlen. After 22 years with the Team 33, he currently lives in Mallorca and working as a freelance producer.

== Discography ==
His long discography includes big names of the music business such as Modern Talking, Fun Factory, David Tavaré, Matthias Reim.

Here is a selection of his works:

ARTIST	ALBUM
2 Eivissa	Oh la la la
2 Eivissa	Are you ready?
Avant-Garde	Get Down
Avant-Garde	You got to be strong
Azuquita feat. Matthias Reim	Te quiero a veces
Baccara	Yes Sir I can boogie
Backstreet Boys	Get Down (You're the one.. )
Bahia Kings	Samba pa ti
Baila Caliente	Hey amor
Beatrice Egli	Ich hab euch vermisst
Bino	Emozioni
Blue System	Operator
Bonnie Taylor	Angel Heart
C. C. Catch	I Can Lose My Heart Tonight '98
Cordalis	Athen 2004
Cordalis	Jungle Beat
Christin Stark	Hier
David Tavare	Summerlove
David Tavare	Hot Summer Night
David Tavaré	Call me baby
David Tavaré	La vida viene y va
DNX feat. The Voice	In the ghetto
Dschungel Stars	Oops we are in the jungle
Errol Brown	Only in America
Errol Brown	Slow Motion
Fun Factory	Non Stop!
Fun Factory	Fun-tastic
Fun Factory	All their best
Fun Factory	Next Generation
Fun Factory	ABC of Music
Gottlieb Wendehals	Polonäse 2000
Hubert Kah	Der NDW-Kult-Mix
Klubbb3	Wir werden immer mehr!
Klubbb3	Paris Paris Paris
Klubbb3	Du schaffst das schon
Klubbb3	Wenn die Sonnenblumen wieder blüh'n
Isabel	Like Snow In June (Da Di Da Du)
Joelle	Upside down
Jürgen Drews	Durch und durch
Kristina Bach	Es kribbelt und es prickelt
Lian Ross	The best of and more
Loona	Oye el boom
M. Amado	Kids of the world
Matthias Reim	Männer sind Krieger
Matthias Reim	The Fan Edition
Matthias Reim	Sieben Leben
Matthias Reim	Phoenix
Matze Knop	Numero Uno
Michael Wendler	Echolot
Michael Wendler	Engel
Michael Wendler	Ich denk' am Weihnachten
Modern Talking	Back for good
Modern Talking	Alone
Modern Talking	Year of the Dragon
Modern Talking	America
N' Sync	Best of my life
Oliver Lukas	Reifezeugnis
Oliver Lukas	Für Dich
Peter Wackel	Bis morgen früh
Peter Wackel	Forever here we go
Stockholm Underground	Gimme Gimme Gimme
Stylus Junkies vs UB40	Food for thought
Supa Richie	Mit Dich Allein
Tapo & Raya	Quitate el top
Tapo & Raya	Bomba
Tatjana	Calendar Girl
Tears`n`Joy	I will always love you
Teeko X	Killing Me Softly
The Real Thing	You to me are everything
Tim Toupet	Wippen
Tom Jones	Remixes
Touché	Part One
Touché	Kids in America
Touché	Another part of us
