= Don't Take Away My Heart =

Single by Modern Talking

from the album Year of the Dragon
- Released: 2 May 2000
- Genre: Eurodance
- Length: 3:54
- Label: BMG; Ariola
- Songwriter: Dieter Bohlen
- Producers: Dieter Bohlen; Luis Rodríguez

Modern Talking singles chronology
"China in Her Eyes" (2000)	"Don't Take Away My Heart" (2000)	"Win the Race" (2001)

Music video
- "Don't Take Away My Heart" on YouTube

"Don't Take Away My Heart" is a song by German musical group Modern Talking. It was released in May 2000 as the second and final single from their ninth album, Year of the Dragon.

== Track listing ==
CD-Maxi Hansa 74321 75448 2 (BMG) / EAN 0743217544829 02.05.2000

1. "Don't Take Away My Heart" (New Vocal Version) - 3:54
2. "Don't Take Away My Heart" (Rap Version) - 3:26
3. "Fly To The Moon" (Rap Version) - 3:07
4. "Modern Talking Megamix 2000" - 5:15

== Charts ==
Chart (2000)	Peak position
Germany (GfK)	41
Greece (IFPI)	8
