= David Tavaré =

Spanish singer and House Music DJ (born 1984)

- Born: David Tavaré; December 20, 1984 (age 41)
- Origin: Pollença, Balearics, Spain
- Genres: House, Eurodance
- Occupation: Singer
- Years active: 2006–present
- Website: https://www.davidtavare.es

David Tavaré (born December 20, 1984) is a Spanish singer and house music DJ.

== Biography ==
David Tavaré was born on December 20, 1984, in Pollença, Spain. He is the son of a legendary Spanish guitar player. Two of his uncles are English comedian Jim Tavaré and former England Test cricketer Chris Tavaré.

Tavaré was brought up on a holiday island and the Mediterranean way of life inspired him. He had always dreamed of being a singer but when he saw Operación Triunfo, the Spanish version of Pop Idol on television, he knew: “This is what I want, I want to sing on a stage”. One of the three finalists of the successful television show, David Bustamante, was his singing teacher.

== Music career ==
"Hot Summer Night (Oh La La La)" was his second song, featuring 2 Eivissa, released first in July 2007 in Spain, where it was a number two hit, then twelve months later in France where it was also successful, becoming one of the summer hits.

Tavaré released his first studio album La vida viene y va in late 2008. The next single after "Hot Summer Night" was "Call Me Baby (If You Don't Know My Name)". Its music video was released in November 2008.

David's first successful single was Summerlove.

== Discography ==
=== Studio albums ===
Title	Details	Peak chart positions
Title	Details	FRA
La vida viene y va	Release date: October 21, 2008; Label: Warner Bros.; Formats: CD	103
"—" denotes releases that did not chart

=== Singles ===
Year	Title	Chart positions						Album
Year	Title	SPA	FRA	GER	BEL	NED	RUS	Album
2006	"Summerlove (Na Na Nahey)" (cover of "Remember" by Summer Love)	1	3	42	6	50	21	La Vida Viene y Va
2007	"Hot Summer Night (Oh La La La)" (feat. 2 Eivissa)	2	2	—	14	—	11	La Vida Viene y Va
2008	"Centerfold" (feat. Nina Kristin)	4	—	—	—	—	—	La Vida Viene y Va
2008	"Call Me Baby (If You Don't Know My Name)" (feat. Ruth)	33	—	—	—	—	37	La Vida Viene y Va
2009	"En La Oscuridad"	—	—	—	—	—	—	La Vida Viene y Va
2009	"Can You Feel The Love Tonight"	—	—	—	—	—	22	La Vida Viene y Va
2010	"Fotonovela"	—	—	—	—	—	—	Non-album singles
2012	"Victory"	—	—	—	—	—	—	Non-album singles
2013	"Stay With Me Tonight"	—	—	—	—	—	—	Non-album singles
2015	"Get Closer" (feat. Lian Ross)	—	—	—	—	—	—	Non-album singles
2015	"We Burn On Fire" (feat. Ron May)	—	—	—	—	—	—	Non-album singles
2017	"Dime" 2006 kdg &*	—	—	—	—	—	—	Non-album singles
2017	"Mueve"	—	—	—	—	—	—	Non-album singles
2018	"Desnúdate"	—	—	—	—	—	—	Non-album singles
