= Hand in Hand =

Hand in Hand may refer to:

== Film and TV ==
- Hand in Hand (1961 film), a British film
- Hand in Hand (Ugandan TV series), a Ugandan soap opera promoting the benefits of vocational training
- Hand in Hand (Singaporean TV series), a Singaporean drama series about kinship
- Hand in Hand: A Benefit for Hurricane Relief, a September 2017 telethon
- Hand in Hand (2010 film), Taiwanese documentary
- Hand in Hand (2012 film), a French film

== Music ==
- Hand in Hand (The Winter album), a 2007 album by beFour
- Hand in Hand (Mulgrew Miller album), 1992

=== Songs ===
- "Hand in Hand", the anthem of football club Feyenoord
- "Hand in Hand" (Olympic theme song), of the 1988 Summer Olympics
- "Hand in Hand", a song by Celine Dion, being a German version of her French song "Ne partez pas sans moi"
- A song on both the Kingdom Hearts Original Soundtrack, and the Kingdom Hearts II Original Soundtrack
- "Hand in Hand" (Elvis Costello song), 1978
- "Hand in Hand", a song by Dire Straits from Making Movies, 1980
- "Hand in Hand", a song by Phil Collins from Face Value, 1981
- "Hand in Hand", a song by the Vels from House of Miracles
- "Hand in Hand" (Grace song), 1997
- "Hand in Hand" (DJ Quik song), 1998
- "Hand in Hand" (charity song), 2003 song sung by artists from Taiwan
- "Hand in Hand" (Beatsteaks song), 2004
- "Hand in Hand" (beFour song), 2007
- "Hand in Hand" (Julian Le Play song), 2016
- "Hand in Hand", a song by Paul McCartney from Egypt Station, 2018
- "Hand in Hand", a 2014 song by Kraftklub

== Other uses ==
- "Hand in Hand", a magazine of football club Feyenoord
- Hand in Hand, an anthology of love poems edited by Carol Ann Duffy
- The Hand in Hand Fire & Life Insurance Society, founded in London in 1696
- Hand in Hand: Center for Jewish-Arab Education in Israel, a network of integrated, bilingual schools for Jewish and Arab children in Israel
