= My Head & My Heart =

2020 single by Ava Max

Single by Ava Max

from the album Heaven & Hell (digital reissue)
- Released: November 19, 2020
- Recorded: September–November 2020
- Genre: Dance-pop
- Length: 2:54
- Label: Atlantic
- Songwriters: Amanda Ava Koci; Henry Walter; Madison Love; Aleksey Potekhin; Sergey Zhukov; A. Mohammed; Thomas Eriksen; Tia Scola
- Producers: Cirkut; Doctor; Earwulf; Jonas Blue

Ava Max singles chronology
"Christmas Without You" (2020)	"My Head & My Heart" (2020)	"EveryTime I Cry" (2021)

Alternate cover
- Spotify cover

Music video
- "My Head & My Heart" on YouTube

"My Head & My Heart" is a song by American singer-songwriter Ava Max, released on November 19, 2020, through Atlantic Records as the fourth and final single from Max's debut studio album Heaven & Hell (2020). The song was included on the digital re-release version of the album. The dance and pop anthem was written by Max, Madison Love, Aleksey Potekhin, Sergey Zhukov, Tia Scola, Earwulf, and Cirkut, with production handled by the latter two producers and Jonas Blue.

"My Head & My Heart" received generally favorable reviews from music critics, who praised the production. The song peaked at number 45 on the US Billboard Hot 100, at number 18 on the UK Singles Chart, and at number 32 on the Billboard Global 200. It is certified platinum in three countries and certified gold in four countries. An accompanying music video was directed by Charm La'Donna and Emil Nava, and depicts Max and a group of dancers performing choreography inside a nightclub. Max performed the song at several televised events.

== Background and development ==
During the COVID-19 pandemic, Max wanted to create a song which would allow people to dance while they were at home. Development of "My Head & My Heart" occurred from September to November 2020, which she intended to release the song in the "right moment". The single was included on a digital-exclusive reissue of Max's debut studio album Heaven & Hell (2020). It was written by Max, Madison Love, Aleksey Potekhin, Sergey Zhukov, Tia Scola, and producers Cirkut, and Earwulf. Jonas Blue was also involved in the song's production.

== Composition ==
Musically, "My Head & My Heart" is a dance and pop anthem, which contains a heavy-layered beat with an electronic sound. It is set in the time signature of 4/4 common time, with a tempo of 116 beats per minute, while composed in the key of A minor. Max's voice on the track ranges from the low note of G_{3} to the high note of E_{5}, while the song is constructed in verse–chorus form. "My Head & My Heart" interpolates ATC's 2000 Eurodance song "Around the World (La La La La La)", which in turn is a cover of the 1998 song "Pesenka" by Ruki Vverh!. The "Pesenka" songwriters, Zhukov and Potekhin are consequently credited as co-writers on "My Head & My Heart".

The lyrics describe a confrontation between Max and her ex-boyfriend that the former cannot get out of her head, which she subsequently "calls upon an old flame to repair her broken heart" on the sing-song hook used in "Around the World (La La La La La)". The contrast of "head" and "heart" is referred to as another form of duality, reinforcing the concept of Max's album title Heaven & Hell.

== Critical reception ==
Writing for Billboard, Gab Ginsberg and Jason Lipshutz praised "My Head & My Heart" as a "sweaty, shimmering dance banger". Both writers acknowledged that it allowed the next generation to hear "Around the World (La La La La La)". Carolyn Droke of Uproxx stated that the song was "a thumping ode to freedom", while Mike Wass of Idolator described it as "irresistible" with a "catchy chorus". Writing for HuffPost, Curtis M. Wong noted that the song is an "exuberant, club-thumping ode to romantic conflict".

== Commercial performance ==
In the United States, "My Head & My Heart" debuted at number 82 on the Billboard Hot 100 chart dated February 20, 2021, eventually peaking at number 45 on the chart dated March 13, 2021. The song was certified platinum by the Recording Industry Association of America (RIAA) on June 1, 2022, for sales of 1,000,000 certified units in the United States. It also reached number 13 on the Mainstream Top 40 chart dated March 20, 2021. In Canada, "My Head & My Heart" debuted at number 88 on the Canadian Hot 100 chart dated March 27, 2021, and peaked at number 21. It received a double platinum certification on April 8, 2022, for sales of 160,000 equivalent-units in the country.

In the United Kingdom, the song debuted at number 98 on the UK Singles Chart dated January 14, 2021. It peaked at number 18 on the chart dated March 26, 2021, and was certified platinum by the British Phonographic Industry (BPI) on July 15, 2022, for sales of 600,000 equivalent-units. On the Australian ARIA Singles Chart, "My Head & My Heart" peaked at number 21 on the chart dated March 8, 2021, and received a platinum certification from the Australian Recording Industry Association (ARIA) for selling over 70,000 equivalent-units in the country.

== Music video ==
In November 2020, a lyric video of "My Head & My Heart" was released. A video for the acoustic version of the song was released on February 11, 2021. Max is seen performing with three female string musicians inside a room covered in red lighting. Her usual blonde hair is colored black, although it is still shaped as the 'Max Cut'. Andrea Dresdale of ABC News Radio noted that the visual was a "cute nod" to the song lyric, "I picture all the perfect that we lived / 'Til I cut the strings on your tiny violin". A performance video was released on February 19, 2021, which depicts British drag queen Bimini Bon-Boulash of RuPaul's Drag Race UK lip syncing the song at the Heaven superclub. The video encouraged viewers to support the charity Mermaids.

In an interview with the Hit Network on February 4, 2021, Max stated that an accompanying music video for "My Head & My Heart" was in development, which she declared as her "sexiest music video yet!". It was filmed under restrictive COVID-19 guidelines, as members on set were COVID-19 tested several times and wore masks between scenes. The music video was released on February 25, 2021, and is directed by Charm La'Donna and Emil Nava. Max acknowledged that it contrasted from her previous videos by stating that it was both "vulnerable" and "dance-inspired", as she envisioned the music video's concept while writing the song. It depicts Max and a cohort of dancers writhing, gyrating, and performing choreography inside a nightclub. She wore several outfits such as a small crop top, red mesh, glitter-covered leather, and a pair of Skechers D'Lites Biggest Fan sneakers.

== Live performances ==
Max appeared on Jimmy Kimmel Live! to perform "My Head & My Heart" on February 25, 2021, which coincided with the release of the music video. During the performance, she navigated through a large cage while the dancers surrounded her. Max performed the song on the March 29, 2021 episode of American morning television program Good Morning America, and on the May 6, 2021 episode of The Kelly Clarkson Show. During the opening party of the Attitude Pride at Home concert on June 23, 2021, Max performed acoustic versions of the 2020 song "Kings & Queens" and "My Head & My Heart".

== Track listing ==
Digital download / streaming – Jonas Blue remix

1. "My Head & My Heart" (Jonas Blue Remix) – 2:59

Digital download / streaming – Kastra remix

1. "My Head & My Heart" (Kastra Remix) – 2:58

Digital download / streaming – Acoustic

1. "My Head & My Heart" (Acoustic) – 3:11

Digital download / streaming – Claptone remix

1. "My Head & My Heart (Claptone Remix) – 3:02

== Credits and personnel ==
Credits adapted from Tidal.

- Amanda Ava Koci – vocals, songwriting
- Henry Walter – songwriting, production, engineering, instruments, programming, vocal production
- Thomas Eriksen – songwriting, production
- Jonas Blue – production
- Madison Love – songwriting
- Aleksey Potekhin – songwriting
- Sergey Zhukov – songwriting
- Tia Scola – songwriting
- John Hanes – engineering, mixing engineering
- Chris Gehringer – mastering
- Serban Ghenea – mixing

== Charts ==
=== Weekly charts ===
Weekly chart performance for "My Head & My Heart"
Chart (2020–2024)	Peak position
Australia (ARIA)	21
Austria (Ö3 Austria Top 40)	26
Belarus Airplay (TopHit)	163
Belgium (Ultratop 50 Flanders)	23
Belgium (Ultratop 50 Wallonia)	9
Bulgaria International (PROPHON)	2
Canada Hot 100 (Billboard)	21
Canada AC (Billboard)	33
Canada CHR/Top 40 (Billboard)	5
Canada Hot AC (Billboard)	13
CIS Airplay (TopHit)	4
Czech Republic Airplay (ČNS IFPI)	25
Czech Republic Singles Digital (ČNS IFPI)	52
Croatia International Airplay (Top lista)	1
Estonia Airplay (TopHit)	193
France (SNEP)	72
France Airplay (SNEP)	13
Germany (GfK)	22
Germany Airplay (BVMI)	1
Global 200 (Billboard)	32
Greece International (IFPI)	51
Hungary (Dance Top 40)	2
Hungary (Rádiós Top 40)	1
Hungary (Single Top 40)	13
Hungary (Stream Top 40)	23
Ireland (IRMA)	17
Italy (FIMI)	54
Kazakhstan Airplay (TopHit)	67
Lithuania (AGATA)	36
Mexico Airplay (Billboard)	6
Netherlands (Dutch Top 40)	20
Netherlands (Single Top 100)	31
New Zealand Hot Singles (RMNZ)	28
Poland Airplay (ZPAV)	5
Portugal (AFP)	139
Romania (Airplay 100)	40
Russia Airplay (TopHit)	3
San Marino (SMRRTV Top 50)	29
Slovakia Airplay (ČNS IFPI)	5
Slovakia Singles Digital (ČNS IFPI)	46
Slovenia (SloTop50)	4
South Korea BGM (Circle)	129
Sweden (Sverigetopplistan)	90
Switzerland (Schweizer Hitparade)	19
Ukraine Airplay (TopHit)	78
UK Singles (Official Charts)	18
US Billboard Hot 100	45
US Adult Pop Airplay (Billboard)	12
US Dance Airplay (Billboard)	15
US Pop Airplay (Billboard)	13

=== Monthly charts ===
Monthly chart performance for "My Head & My Heart"
Chart (2021–2023)	Peak position
CIS Airplay (TopHit)	5
Czech Republic (Rádio – Top 100)	21
Czech Republic (Singles Digitál Top 100)	53
Kazakhstan Airplay (TopHit)	93
Russia Airplay (TopHit)	5
Slovakia (Rádio – Top 100)	6
Slovakia (Singles Digitál Top 100)	47

=== Year-end charts ===
2020 year-end chart performance for "My Head & My Heart"
Chart (2020)	Position
Hungary (Dance Top 40)	96

2021 year-end chart performance for "My Head & My Heart"
Chart (2021)	Position
Australia (ARIA)	65
Belgium (Ultratop Wallonia)	50
Bulgaria (PROPHON)	7
Canada (Canadian Hot 100)	69
Croatia (HRT)	2
CIS Airplay (TopHit)	21
Germany (Official German Charts)	75
Global 200 (Billboard)	159
Hungary (Dance Top 40)	4
Hungary (Rádiós Top 40)	6
Hungary (Stream Top 40)	50
Poland (Polish Airplay Top 100)	38
Russia Airplay (TopHit)	30
Switzerland (Schweizer Hitparade)	64
UK Singles (OCC)	53
US Adult Top 40 (Billboard)	44

2022 year-end chart performance for "My Head & My Heart"
Chart (2022)	Position
CIS Airplay (TopHit)	142
Hungary (Dance Top 40)	27
Hungary (Rádiós Top 40)	7

2023 year-end chart performance for "My Head & My Heart"
Chart (2023)	Position
Kazakhstan Airplay (TopHit)	184

== Certifications ==
Certifications and sales for "My Head & My Heart"
Region	Certification	Certified units/sales
Australia (ARIA)	Platinum	70,000^{‡}
Austria (IFPI Austria)	Platinum	30,000^{‡}
Brazil (Pro-Música Brasil)	2× Platinum	80,000^{‡}
Canada (Music Canada)	2× Platinum	160,000^{‡}
Denmark (IFPI Danmark)	Gold	45,000^{‡}
France (SNEP)	Platinum	200,000^{‡}
Germany (BVMI)	Gold	200,000^{‡}
Italy (FIMI)	Platinum	70,000^{‡}
New Zealand (RMNZ)	Platinum	30,000^{‡}
Norway (IFPI Norway)	Gold	30,000^{‡}
Poland (ZPAV)	2× Platinum	100,000^{‡}
Portugal (AFP)	Gold	5,000^{‡}
Spain (Promusicae)	Platinum	60,000^{‡}
United Kingdom (BPI)	Platinum	600,000^{‡}
United States (RIAA)	Platinum	1,000,000^{‡}
^{‡} Sales+streaming figures based on certification alone.

== Release history ==
Release dates and formats for "My Head & My Heart"
Region	Date	Format(s)	Version	Label(s)	Ref.
Various	November 19, 2020	Digital download; streaming	Original	Atlantic	
Italy	December 1, 2020	Radio airplay	Original	Warner	
Various	December 10, 2020	Digital download; streaming	Jonas Blue remix	Atlantic	
United States	January 26, 2021	Contemporary hit radio	Original	Atlantic	
Various	January 28, 2021	Digital download; streaming	Kastra remix	Atlantic	
Various	February 11, 2021	Digital download; streaming	Acoustic	Atlantic	
Various	March 4, 2021	Digital download; streaming	Claptone remix	Atlantic	
