= La La La =

La La La, or variants, may refer to:

== Music ==
- "La la la", a non-lexical vocable in music

=== Albums ===
- La La La (Luis Alberto Spinetta and Fito Páez album), 1986
- La La La (Maki Ohguro album), 1995
- La La La, a 2004 album by Sammi Cheng

=== Songs ===
==== Songs with the title ====
- "La La La" (Massiel song), by Massiel, 1968
- "La La La (If I Had You)", by Bobby Sherman, 1969
- "La-La-La" (Jay-Z song), 2003
- "La La La" (LMFAO song), 2009
- "La La La" (Snoop Lion song), 2012
- "La La La" (Naughty Boy song), 2013
- "Lalala" (song), by Y2K and bbno$, 2019
- "LaLaLa" (Black Coffee and Usher song), 2019
- "La La La", by The Rattles, 1965
- "La La La", by Gerry and the Pacemakers, 1966
- "La La La", by Moka Only from Road Life, 2000
- "La La La", by Misia from Marvelous, 2001
- "La La La", by The Bird and the Bee, 2007
- "La La La", by Chris Webby, 2009
- "La La La", by Auburn, 2010
- "La La La", by Indiggo, 2011
- "La La La" by Mike Krol, 2015
- "La La la", by Willy William, 2018
- "Lalala", by Noahfinnce, 2022
- "Lalala", by Young Jonn, 2025
- "La La La", by Bjorn and Shashwat Sachdev from the 2022 Indian film Attack: Part 1
- "La La La La", by Mac Miller, 2010

==== Songs that include the term ====
- "Pesenka (La La La)", by Ruki Vverh!, 1998
  - "Around the World (La La La La La)", by ATC, 2000
  - "Sing La La La", by Carolina Márquez, 2013
- "Sing and Move (La La La Laaaa)", by Banaroo, 2006
- "Go Hard (La.La.La)", by Kreayshawn, 2012
- "Dare (La La La)", by Shakira, 2014

== Other uses ==
- Kylie: La La La, a 2002 book by Kylie Minogue and William Baker
- Lalala, a residential area in Libreville, Gabon

== See also ==
- "Lalalala", a song by Stray Kids, 2023
- "Lalalalalalalalalala", a song by Mikolas Josef, 2020
- La (disambiguation)
- La La (disambiguation)
- Ululation, a long, wavering, high-pitched vocal sound
