= Thomas Anders ...sings Modern Talking =

Photo of the project Thomas Anders ...sings Modern Talking

Thomas Anders ...sings Modern Talking is a musical project by Thomas Anders and Christian Geller consisting of the reconstruction of the first six albums of the band Modern Talking by Thomas Anders solo.

== History ==
At the end of 2024, Thomas Anders, to celebrate Modern Talking's 40th anniversary, announced a re-recording of the band's first six albums, in collaboration with Geller, in 2025. Additionally, each album features two new songs, one of which is accompanied by a music video. Each album is preceded by at least two singles (two of the album's most famous songs; or a maxi-single). All albums and singles are released on Fridays. The album covers and some singles feature Thomas Anders from 1984-1987 and Thomas Anders from 2025. The Thomas Anders...sings Modern Talking series is published by Stars by Edel, and the tracks are produced by Christian Geller.

They are available in the following versions:

- 3 x CD (Thomas' Version, In The Mix, Instrumental),
- 2 x LP (Thomas' Version, In The Mix),
- 24 x digital (12 x Thomas' Version, 12 x In The Mix),
- 2 x CD (Thomas' Version, In The Mix),

alternatively:

- 4 x CD (Thomas' Version, In The Mix, Instrumental, Limited Maxi-Single),
- 2 x LP + 1 x 12'' (Thomas' Version, In The Mix, Limited Maxi-Single).

== Albums, singles and music videos ==
Based on Discogs.

=== Albums ===
Title	Release date
...Sings Modern Talking: The 1st Album	March 7, 2025
...Sings Modern Talking: Let's Talk About Love	May 2, 2025
...Sings Modern Talking: Ready for Romance	June 20, 2025
...Sings Modern Talking: In the Middle of Nowhere	August 8, 2025
...Sings Modern Talking: Romantic Warriors	October 17, 2025
...Sings Modern Talking: In the Garden of Venus	November 14, 2025

=== Singles ===
Title	Release date
You're My Heart, You're My Soul (Thomas' Version)	January 10, 2025
There's Too Much Blue in Missing You (Thomas' Version)	February 14, 2025
Cheri Cheri Lady (Thomas' Version)	March 28, 2025
With a Little Love (Thomas' Version)	April 18, 2025
Don't Break My Soul	May 2, 2025
Don't Fly Too High / Don't Break My Soul (Long Versions)	May 2, 2025
Brother Louie (Thomas' Version)	May 23, 2025
Atlantis Is Calling (S.O.S. for Love) (Thomas' Version)	June 6, 2025
Brother Louie / Atlantis Is Calling (S.O.S. for Love) (Long Versions)	June 20, 2025
Geronimo's Cadillac (Thomas' Version)	July 11, 2025
Lonely Tears in Chinatown (Thomas' Version)	July 25, 2025
Geronimo's Cadillac / Cherokee Highway (Long Versions)	August 8, 2025
Jet Airliner (Thomas' Version)	August 29, 2025
Don't Worry (Thomas' Version)	September 26, 2025
Jet Airliner / Don't Worry (Long Versions)	October 17, 2025
In 100 Years (Thomas' Version)	October 31, 2025
Boulevard Of Broken Dreams	November 7, 2025
In 100 Years / Boulevard Of Broken Dreams (Long Versions)	November 14, 2025

=== Music videos ===
Title	Release date
Don't Fly Too High	March 14, 2025
Don't Break My Soul	May 2, 2025
Midnight Lover	June 20, 2025
Cherokee Highway	August 8, 2025
Lost In Your Eyes	October 17, 2025
In The Garden Of Venus	November 14, 2025
