= Dale Saunders (singer) =

- Born: 3 August 1978 (age 48); Saint Kitts and Nevis
- Genres: Soca, R&B, Pop, fusion music
- Occupations: Singer, songwriter
- Instrument: Vocals
- Label: RockSmash Records

Dale Saunders (born 3 August 1978) is a Saint Kitts and Nevis-born soca singer now established in London, England. He is also well known for fusion of his music with R&B, ragga and pop music bridging various genres. He was nominated for Best New Male Soca Artist category at the 2010/2011 International Soca Music Awards. He released his debut album Here I Am on 24 June 2011 on RockSmash Records and distribution by Island Def Jam.

He has released a number of well-received hits that showcase his versatility, and appeal for Caribbean countries and in England and continental Europe. In 2013, he was featured in the single "Sing La La La" by Colombian/Italian singer Carolina Márquez featuring Flo Rida and Saunders. A remake of Ruki Vverh! Russian hit "Pesenka" and anglicized "Around the World (La La La La La)", "Sing La La La" became an international hit appearing in charts in Austria, France and many other countries.

== Discography ==
=== Albums ===
- 2011: Here I Am

=== Singles ===
Singles (selective)

- "Party Over Here"
- "Gimme More"
- "If Only For Tonight"
- "Jumping Day and Night"
- "Regular Guy"
- "LTLF (Let The Love Flow) Ft Dan Clare"
- "Catch Your Love Ft T-Pain"

Featured in

Year	Single	Peak positions					Album
Year	Single	AUT	FRA	GER	ITA	SUI	Album
2013	"Sing La La La" (Carolina Márquez feat. Flo Rida & Dale Saunders)	44	81	82		70	

Collaborations / Others

- "LTLF (Let The Love Flow)" feat. Dan Clare
- "Spread My Wings" (Vine Street feat. Pitbull, Dale Saunders and Raquel)
