= Pesenka =

Song by the Russian pop–dance–techno group Ruki Vverh

Single by Ruki Vverh!

from the album Sdelai pogromtsche!
- Released: 1998
- Genre: Eurodance
- Songwriters: Sergey Zhukov and Aleksey Potekhin

"Pesenka" (Russian: Песенка, IPA: [ˈpʲesʲɪnkə], lit. 'little song'), sometimes known as "Pesenka (La La La)", is a song by the Russian pop-dance-techno group Ruki Vverh! (Руки Вверх!, Hands Up!). The song, with lyrics in Russian and music by band members Sergey Zhukov and Aleksey Potekhin, appears in the band's 1998 album Sdelai pogromche! (Сделай погромче!, Make it a little louder!). Lisa Rodnyanskaya is the vocalist.

== Famous charting adaptations ==
=== ATC version: "Around the World (La La La La La)" (2000) ===
Around the World (La La La La La) is the more internationally famous English language version of the song. It was produced and recorded in late 1999 and released on May 9, 2000 by German-based Eurodance group A Touch of Class which is a cover of the Russian hit. The song, their debut single from their debut album Planet Pop reached No. 1 in Germany, Austria and Switzerland and the Top 20 in Australia, Belgium, Canada, the Netherlands, Finland, France, Italy, Sweden, Denmark, Poland, Romania, and Scotland. It also reached No. 24 on the Irish Singles Chart, No. 15 on the UK Singles Chart, and No. 28 on the US Billboard Hot 100.

=== beFour version: "Magic Melody" (2007) ===
"Magic Melody"

Single by beFour

from the album All 4 One
- B-side: "Fly Around the World"
- Released: June 14, 2007
- Recorded: January 1, 2007
- Genre: Pop
- Length: 3:47
- Label: Pop 'N' Roll
- Songwriters: Aleksey Potekhin (original); Sergey Zhukov (original); Christian Geller (additional)
- Producers: Christian Geller; Adam Bernau

BeFour singles chronology
"Magic Melody" (2007)	"How Do You Do?" /"All 4 One" (2007)

On January 1, 2007, the song was covered by beFour, a German pop group founded in Cologne, under the title "Magic Melody". Released on June 14, 2007 it heavily samples on the song with changed lyrics and appears on the beFour debut album All 4 One. The single made it to the Top 20 only in Austria, Germany, and Switzerland. The version did not match the global success and impact of its original cover version by ATC.

Track listings

The CD maxi version contains the following tracks plus a beFour sticker as bonus:

1. "Magic Melody" (3:39)
2. "Fly Around the World" (3:47)
3. "Wir sind" (2:18)

Charts

Chart (2007)	Peak position
Austria (Ö3 Austria Top 40)	11
Eurochart Hot 100	45
Germany (GfK)	16
Switzerland (Schweizer Hitparade)	14

Year-end charts

Chart (2007)	Position
Austria (Ö3 Austria Top 40)	59
Germany (Official German Charts)	91
Switzerland (Schweizer Hitparade)	89

=== Carolina Márquez version: "Sing La La La" (2013) ===
"Sing La La La"

Single by Carolina Márquez featuring Flo Rida and Dale Saunders
- Released: March 18, 2013
- Recorded: January 1, 2013
- Genre: Pop
- Length: 3:30
- Label: Kontor
- Songwriters: Sergey Zhukov (original); Aleksey Potekhin (original); Additional credits Alex Christensen; Peter Könemann; Tramar Dillard; Stephen Singer; Rocio Carolina; Mateus Alfonso; Dale Saunders
- Producer: E-Partment

Flo Rida singles chronology
"Sing La La La" (2013)

On January 1, 2013, the song was covered by Carolina Márquez, a Colombian-Italian singer, under the title "Sing La La La". This song was released on compilation Kontor Top of the Clubs Vol. 58. This version produced by E-Partment features Flo Rida and Dale Saunders and includes additional amended lyrics and a rap verse. The single was released in March 2013, making it to the charts only in Austria, France, and Switzerland.

Track listings

1. "Sing La La La" (E-Partment Short Mix)" (3:30)
2. "Sing La La La" (E-Partment Extended Mix) (4:40)

Charts

Chart (2013)	Peak position
Austria (Ö3 Austria Top 40)	44
Belgium (Ultratip Bubbling Under Wallonia)	25
France (SNEP)	81
Germany (GfK)	82
Switzerland (Schweizer Hitparade)	70

Certifications

Region	Certification	Certified units/sales
Italy (FIMI)	Gold	15,000^{*}
^{*} Sales figures based on certification alone.

=== R3hab and A Touch of Class version: "All Around the World (La La La)" (2019) ===
In 2019, Dutch DJ R3hab released a cover version titled "All Around the World (La La La)", with the band being credited as A Touch of Class. It charted in many European charts in addition to U.S. Billboard Hot Dance/Electronic Songs chart.

== Samples and interpolations ==
The song has been sampled and interpolated in many songs, including:

- In 2010, Girlicious sampled a melody element from Pesenka in their own hit "2 in the Morning". It was released as the third single off the band's second album Rebuilt.
- Also in 2010, the American singer Auburn sampled a part of the song in her released single "La La La". This release also featured British Virgin Islands singer Iyaz.
- Also in 2010, the Swedish band JJ sampled it in their song "My Life".
- In 2011, Chevy Woods sampled it in his song called "She in Love". This track appears on his mixtape Red Cup Music.
- In 2013, American rapper Dorrough sampled it in his 2013 song "La La La" with the track featuring Wiz Khalifa. It was produced by Play-N-Skillz and contains additional rap verse.
- In 2014, Marin Monster sampled it in 2014 single "Pour Commencer" featuring Maître Gims. The single charted in France.
- In 2020, Eldzhey and Morgenshtern sampled the song for their song "Lollipop".
- Also in 2020, Ava Max sampled the song for her song "My Head & My Heart".
- In 2021, Purple Disco Machine with Tasita D'Mour sampled the song for their song "Rise".
- Also in 2021, American rapper Pitbull interpolated "Around the World" with Cuban DJ IAmChino for their single "Discoteca" from IAmChino's album The Most Winning.

== Other uses ==
ATC's "Around the World" was also used in a television commercial for General Electric in the United States in February 2002 during the 2002 Winter Olympics.

== All versions ==
Since its release in 1998, Pesenka saw tens of covers, remixes and/or other versions performed by various artists from many parts of the world from 2000 and onwards. These versions are:

- Руки Вверх! — Песенка (Ла Ла Ла) (Ruki Vverh! — Pesenka (La La La)) (1998), first and original
- ATC — Around the World (May 2000), internationally famous version and cover
- Naked 'Round the Block — Around the World (2000), ATC cover
- Dkay.com — Around the World (La La La La La) (2000)
- Sha-ila — Daj (2001)
- Jamaica Soundsystem — Around the World (2001), ATC cover
- Audiosmog — Around the World (La La La La La) (2001), ATC cover
- Max Raabe and Palast Orchester — Around the World (2001), ATC cover
- beFour — Magic Melody (June 2007), ATC cover with different lyrics
- Beat Ink — Around the World (December 2007)
- Kollegah — Selfmade Hustler (2008)
- Chris Webby — La La La (April 2009)
- Teclado lindinho 2009 (June 2009)
- Kompulsor — Around the World (La La La) (2009)
- Kla$ & Лена — Танцуй со мной (Kla$ & Lena — Tancuj so mnoj) (2009)
- Auburn ft. Iyaz — La La La (2010)
- Girlicious — 2 in the Morning (2010)
- JJ — My Life (2010)
- Chevy Woods — She In Love (2011)
- Kid Ink — Fastlane (2011)
- Zed Zilla and Young Dolph — I'm Blowin (2011)
- The Disco Boys — Around the World (2012)
- Pipes — Confession (2012)
- Oregonized — Around the World (2012)
- BenNY Blanko — Peace (Interlude) (2012)
- Gromee feat. Tommy Gunn and Ali Tennant — You Make Me Say (2012)
- Carolina Marquez ft. Flo Rida & Dale Saunders — Sing La La La (2013)
- Dorrough ft. Wiz Khalifa — La La La (2013)
- Bones — HeartagramAdios (2014)
- Marin Monster ft. Gims — Pour Commencer (2014)
- Metek — Le Plus Grand Fan De Metek (2014)
- Tradelove — Around the World (La, La, La) (2014)
- Black Smurf — King Smurf (2014)
- DJ Cassious — LaLaLa (2015)
- Marihuana — Bonez MC ft. Lx (2016)
- Sound of Legend — Sweet (La La La) (2017)
- Big Dope P — Presidential Pimpin (2017)
- Blacha — Pokerface (2018)
- Teabe — Lalala (2018)
- Alex Christensen ft. The Berlin Orchestra and Melanie C — Around the World (2018), ATC cover
- MOUNT & Noize Generation — Around the World (2018), ATC cover
- R3hab feat. A Touch of Class — All Around the World (La La La) (2019)
- Eripe and Mario Kontrargument — Nienawiść W Rytmie Disco (2019)
- DJ Matrix, Carolina Marquez, Ludwig — COURMAYEUR (December 2019)
- Элджей (Eldzhey) & MORGENSHTERN — Lollipop (September 2020)
- Ava Max — My Head & My Heart (November 2020)
- Тони Раут — Опопсел (Toni Raut — Opopsel) (2021)
- Pitbull, IAMCHINO — Discoteca (2022)
- Braaheim — All Around The World (La La La La La) (2022)
- Semitoo feat. DJane Housekat & Ivan Fillini - Around The World (La La La) (2022)
- DJ Smash, Клава Кока — Пятница (Dj Smash, Klava Koka — Pjatnica) (2023)
- Fyex - Around The World (Techno Remix) (2023)
- Мария Янковская - Ла Ла Ла (Maria Yankovskya - La La La) (2026), Руки Вверх (Ruki Vverh!) cover
