= Carolina Márquez =

Colombian-Italian singer, dancer and record producer

- Born: 22 September 1975 (age 50); Bogotá, Colombia
- Genres: Dance-pop, electro, italo dance, latin pop
- Occupations: Singer, songwriter, musician, dancer, record producer
- Instrument: Vocals
- Years active: 1998–present
- Label: Do It Yourself Entertainment
- Website: carolinamarquez.net

Carolina Márquez (born 22 September 1975), is a Colombian-Italian singer, songwriter, dancer and record producer who resides in Rome.

Márquez left Colombia in 1986 for Spain to study drama at the Escuela de Arte Dramático in Barcelona. In 1991, she moved with her family to Venice, Italy where she studied modern languages and literature. Her first notable musical success was with "S.E.X.O.", a song she had written, after performing it in Milan in front of 80,000 spectators. The song became a pan-European club hit. Capitalizing on this success, she released her first dance album Más Música on Do It Yourself and on Virgin Italy record labels. The album comprised fifteen tracks that she had written, performed and produced.

In 2004, Carolina Márquez had an international hit with "The Killer's Song" based on the music of "Twisted Nerve" by composer G. Hermann, when it was used in the soundtrack of the film Kill Bill by Quentin Tarantino. In 2005, a follow-up "The Killer's Song Vol II" was released with remixes by well-known Euro DJs including one by The Disco Boys, a German electronic duo act. Mixes of the song were heavily played in Ibiza. EMI marketed the song in Latin America, with Ultra distributing it in the United States. A follow-up single "Pleasure Ground" was also a hit in Italy in addition to some international success with Márquez heavily touring Europe.

After a relative hiatus for many years (2006–2010), Carolina Márquez made a comeback in 2011 with "Wicked Wow" after a remix by DJ Chuckie. In 2012, she released "Weekend (Wicked Wow)" that was credited as Carolina Márquez vs Jay Kay and featuring Lil Wayne & Glasses Malone.

In 2013, she released "Sing La La La" sampling on "Pesenka" by Ruki Vverh! / "Around the World (La La La La La)" by A Touch of Class (aka ATC). Márquez’ version features Flo Rida and Dale Saunders and has become an international hit all over again.

== Personal life ==
Carolina Márquez has dual citizenship. She is originally Colombian, but acquired Italian citizenship after residing many years in the country.

== Discography ==
=== Albums ===
- 2002: Más Música
- 2007: Angel De Fuego (10th Anniversary)

=== Singles and EPs ===
(International charts)

Year	Single	Peak positions										Album
Year	Single	ITA	AUT	BEL (Vl)	BEL (Wa)	DEN	FIN	FRA	GER	NED	SUI	Album
2004	"The Killer's Song"		–	29 (Ultratop)	6 (Ultratip)	10	18	57	–	57	–	Soundtrack
2005	"Pleasure Ground"	30	–	–	–	–	5	–	–	–	–	
2013	"Sing La La La" (feat. Flo Rida & Dale Saunders)		44	–	25 (Ultratip)	–	–	60	82	–	70	
2016	"Oh La La La" (feat. Akon & J Rand)		–	–	–	–	–	–	–	–	–	

(Selective)

- 1998: "S.E.X.O."
- 1998: "Amor Erótico"
- 1999: "Cont@cto"
- 2000: "Super DJ"
- 2000: "Bisex Alarm"
- 2001: "Ritmo"
- 2002: "Discomani"
- 2002: "Más Música"
- 2004: "The Killer's Song" (from soundtrack)
- 2005: "The Killer's Song Vol. 2"
- 2005: "Pleasure Ground"
- 2006: "Angel De Fuego"
- 2011: "Wicked Wow"
- 2012: "Weekend (Wicked Wow)" (Carolina Márquez vs Jaykay featuring Lil Wayne & Glasses Malone)
- 2013: "Sing La La La"
- 2013: "Get on the floor" (Carolina Márquez Feat. Pitbull, Dale Saunders, & Roscoe Umali)
