= We Stand United =

Studio album by beFour
- Released: April 18, 2008
- Genre: Bubblegum pop
- Length: 47:28 (Standard edition)
- Label: Universal
- Producers: Christian Geller, Adam Bernau

BeFour chronology
Hand In Hand (The Winter Album) (2007)	We Stand United (2008)	Friends 4 Ever (2009)

Singles from We Stand United
- 1. "Live Your Dream" Released: March 3, 2008; 2. "Happy Holiday" Released: July 8, 2008

We Stand United is the third studio album by pop group beFour via Universal Records. It was released on April 18, 2008 in German speaking Europe. The lead single from the album, "Live Your Dream" was officially released in March 2008.

== Production ==
Just like the previous two studio albums of the band, All 4 One and Hand in Hand - The Winter Album, Christian Geller and Adam Bernau have also produced this one.

== Release ==
The studio album was released on April 18, 2008 in Germany, Austria and Switzerland. In Germany, the longplayer made it to tenth place in the German album charts and stayed there for a total of 20 weeks. In Austria, We Stand United was immediately placed fourth and also stayed in the charts for 20 weeks. The album finished eleventh in the Swiss hit parade, here it stayed 21 weeks in the charts.

As the only single release appeared on March 14, 2008, the song Live Your Dream (Live your dream) in German-speaking countries. The title reached number 16 in the German single charts and stayed there for nine weeks. In Austria, the song made it to 17th position and was on the charts for eleven weeks. In Switzerland, the piece made it to number 29. After nine weeks, the song fell from the chart standings. The director of the shooting of the music video led Mark Feuerstake.

== Track listing ==
No.	Title	Length
1.	"Live Your Dream"	3:45
2.	"Happy Holiday"	3:37
3.	"Listen To Your Heart"	3:11
4.	"We Stand United"	3:33
5.	"SMS"	3:35
6.	"Time To Dance"	3:10
7.	"Space Race"	3:51
8.	"Zabadak"	3:56
9.	"Balla Balla"	3:32
10.	"Last Flight To The Stars"	2:59
11.	"Give It Up"	3:42
12.	"You Gave Me Life"	4:07
13.	"Befour Undercover"	4:23

== Charts ==
Chart (2008)	Peak position
Austrian Albums (Ö3 Austria)	4
German Albums (Offizielle Top 100)	10
Swiss Albums (Schweizer Hitparade)	10
