= ...Sings Modern Talking: In the Garden of Venus =

Studio album by Thomas Anders
- Released: 14 November 2025
- Length: 2:02:04
- Label: Stars by Edel
- Producer: Christian Geller

Thomas Anders chronology
| ...Sings Modern Talking: Romantic Warriors (2025) | ...Sings Modern Talking: In the Garden of Venus (2025) |

...Sings Modern Talking: In the Garden of Venus is the twenty-first studio album by German singer Thomas Anders, released on 14 November 2025 by Stars by Edel. It is the sixth and final album in the Thomas Anders ...sings Modern Talking series.

== Track listing ==
| No. | Title | Length |
|---|---|---|
| 1. | "In 100 Years" (Thomas' Version) | 4:09 |
| 2. | "Don't Let It Get You Down" (Thomas' Version) | 3:44 |
| 3. | "Who Will Save the World" (Thomas' Version) | 3:21 |
| 4. | "A Telegram to Your Heart" (Thomas' Version) | 3:06 |
| 5. | "It's Christmas" (Thomas' Version) | 4:07 |
| 6. | "Don't Lose My Number" (Thomas' Version) | 3:24 |
| 7. | "Slow Motion" (Thomas' Version) | 3:46 |
| 8. | "Locomotion Tango" (Thomas' Version) | 4:15 |
| 9. | "Good Girls Go to Heaven – Bad Girls Go to Everywhere" (Thomas' Version) | 3:47 |
| 10. | "In the Garden of Venus" (New Bonus Track) | 3:22 |
| 11. | "Boulevard of Broken Dreams" (New Bonus Track) | 3:47 |
| 12. | "In 100 Years (Reprise)" (Thomas' Version) | 1:30 |
| 13. | "In 100 Years" (Thomas' Version – In the Mix) | 3:34 |
| 14. | "Don't Let It Get You Down" (Thomas' Version – In the Mix) | 4:04 |
| 15. | "Who Will Save the World" (Thomas' Version – In the Mix) | 3:02 |
| 16. | "A Telegram to Your Heart" (Thomas' Version – In the Mix) | 2:41 |
| 17. | "It's Christmas" (Thomas' Version – In the Mix) | 3:45 |
| 18. | "Don't Lose My Number" (Thomas' Version – In the Mix) | 3:00 |
| 19. | "Slow Motion" (Thomas' Version – In the Mix) | 2:36 |
| 20. | "Locomotion Tango" (Thomas' Version – In the Mix) | 3:49 |
| 21. | "Good Girls Go to Heaven – Bad Girls Go to Everywhere" (Thomas' Version – In the Mix) | 3:26 |
| 22. | "In the Garden of Venus" (New Bonus Track – In the Mix) | 2:57 |
| 23. | "Boulevard of Broken Dreams" (New Bonus Track – In the Mix) | 3:03 |
| 24. | "In 100 Years (Reprise)" (Thomas' Version – In the Mix) | 1:31 |
| 25. | "In 100 Years" (Thomas' Version – Instrumental) | 4:09 |
| 26. | "Don't Let It Get You Down" (Thomas' Version – Instrumental) | 3:44 |
| 27. | "Who Will Save the World" (Thomas' Version – Instrumental) | 3:21 |
| 28. | "A Telegram to Your Heart" (Thomas' Version – Instrumental) | 3:06 |
| 29. | "It's Christmas" (Thomas' Version – Instrumental) | 4:07 |
| 30. | "Don't Lose My Number" (Thomas' Version – Instrumental) | 3:24 |
| 31. | "Slow Motion" (Thomas' Version – Instrumental) | 3:46 |
| 32. | "Locomotion Tango" (Thomas' Version – Instrumental) | 4:15 |
| 33. | "Good Girls Go to Heaven – Bad Girls Go to Everywhere" (Thomas' Version – Instrumental) | 3:47 |
| 34. | "In the Garden of Venus" (Thomas' Version – Instrumental) | 3:22 |
| 35. | "Boulevard of Broken Dreams" (New Bonus Track – Instrumental) | 3:47 |
| 36. | "In 100 Years (Reprise)" (Thomas' Version – Instrumental) | 1:30 |
| Total length: | | 2:02:04 |

== Charts ==
Chart performance for ...Sings Modern Talking - In the Garden of Venus
| Chart (2025) | Peak position |
|---|---|
| Austrian Albums (Ö3 Austria) | 18 |
| German Albums (Offizielle Top 100) | 8 |
| German Pop Albums (Offizielle Top 100) | 4 |
