= ...Sings Modern Talking: Romantic Warriors =

Studio album by Thomas Anders
- Released: 17 October 2025
- Length: 2:07:53
- Label: Stars by Edel
- Producer: Christian Geller

Thomas Anders chronology
...Sings Modern Talking: In the Middle of Nowhere (2025)	...Sings Modern Talking: Romantic Warriors (2025)	...Sings Modern Talking: In the Garden of Venus (2025)

...Sings Modern Talking: Romantic Warriors is the twentieth studio album by German singer Thomas Anders, released on 17 October 2025 by Stars by Edel. It is the fifth album in the Thomas Anders ...sings Modern Talking series.

== Track listing ==
No.	Title	Length
1.	"Jet Airliner" (Thomas' Version)	4:21
2.	"Like A Hero" (Thomas' Version)	3:45
3.	"Don’t Worry" (Thomas' Version)	3:37
4.	"Blinded By Your Love" (Thomas' Version)	3:49
5.	"Romantic Warriors" (Thomas' Version)	4:10
6.	"Arabian Gold" (Thomas' Version)	3:42
7.	"We Still Have Dreams" (Thomas' Version)	3:17
8.	"Operator Gimme 609" (Thomas' Version)	3:49
9.	"You And Me" (Thomas' Version)	4:07
10.	"Charlene" (Thomas' Version)	3:43
11.	"Lost In Your Eyes" (New Bonus Track)	3:20
12.	"Flying On The Wings Of Loneliness" (New Bonus Track)	3:35
13.	"Jet Airliner" (Thomas' Version – In The Mix)	3:18
14.	"Like A Hero" (Thomas' Version – In The Mix)	3:29
15.	"Don’t Worry" (Thomas' Version – In The Mix)	3:00
16.	"Blinded By Your Love" (Thomas' Version – In The Mix)	3:02
17.	"Romantic Warriors" (Thomas' Version – In The Mix)	3:31
18.	"Arabian Gold" (Thomas' Version – In The Mix)	3:11
19.	"We Still Have Dreams" (Thomas' Version – In The Mix)	3:18
20.	"Operator Gimme 609" (Thomas' Version – In The Mix)	3:11
21.	"You And Me" (Thomas' Version – In The Mix)	3:08
22.	"Charlene" (Thomas' Version – In The Mix)	3:12
23.	"Lost In Your Eyes" (New Bonus Track – In The Mix)	2:53
24.	"Flying On The Wings Of Loneliness" (New Bonus Track – In The Mix)	2:36
25.	"Jet Airliner" (Thomas' Version – Instrumental)	4:21
26.	"Like A Hero" (Thomas' Version – Instrumental)	3:45
27.	"Don’t Worry" (Thomas' Version – Instrumental)	3:37
28.	"Blinded By Your Love" (Thomas' Version – Instrumental)	3:49
29.	"Romantic Warriors" (Thomas' Version – Instrumental)	4:10
30.	"Arabian Gold" (Thomas' Version – Instrumental)	3:42
31.	"We Still Have Dreams" (Thomas' Version – Instrumental)	3:17
32.	"Operator Gimme 609" (Thomas' Version – Instrumental)	3:49
33.	"You And Me" (Thomas' Version – Instrumental)	4:07
34.	"Charlene" (Thomas' Version – Instrumental)	3:43
35.	"Lost In Your Eyes" (New Bonus Track – Instrumental)	3:20
36.	"Flying On The Wings Of Loneliness" (New Bonus Track – Instrumental)	3:35
Total length:		2:07:53

== Charts ==
Chart performance for ...Sings Modern Talking - Romantic Warriors
Chart (2025)	Peak position
Belgian Albums (Ultratop Wallonia)	185
German Albums (Offizielle Top 100)	8
Swiss Albums (Schweizer Hitparade)	55
German Pop Albums (Offizielle Top 100)	4
