= ...Sings Modern Talking: In the Middle of Nowhere =

Studio album by Thomas Anders
- Released: 8 August 2025
- Recorded: 2025
- Genre: Pop
- Length: 2:04:47
- Label: Stars by Edel
- Producer: Christian Geller

Thomas Anders chronology
...Sings Modern Talking: Ready for Romance (2025)	...Sings Modern Talking: In the Middle of Nowhere (2025)	...Sings Modern Talking: Romantic Warriors (2025)

...Sings Modern Talking: In the Middle of Nowhere is the nineteenth studio album by German singer Thomas Anders, released on 8 August 2025 by Stars by Edel. It is the fourth album in the Thomas Anders ...sings Modern Talking series.

== Track listing ==
No.	Title	Length
1.	"Geronimo's Cadillac" (Thomas' Version)	3:19
2.	"Riding on a White Swan" (Thomas' Version)	3:55
3.	"Give Me Peace on Earth" (Thomas' Version)	4:07
4.	"Sweet Little Sheila" (Thomas' Version)	3:23
5.	"Ten Thousand Lonely Drums" (Thomas' Version)	3:30
6.	"Lonely Tears in Chinatown" (Thomas' Version)	3:33
7.	"In Shaire" (Thomas' Version)	3:46
8.	"Stranded In The Middle Of Nowhere" (Thomas' Version)	4:34
9.	"The Angels Sing in New York City" (Thomas' Version)	3:35
10.	"Princess of the Night" (Thomas' Version)	4:05
11.	"Cherokee Highway" (New Bonus Track)	3:41
12.	"Voodoo Love" (New Bonus Track)	3:20
13.	"Geronimo's Cadillac" (Thomas' Version – In the Mix)	2:40
14.	"Riding On A White Swan" (Thomas' Version – In the Mix)	2:55
15.	"Give Me Peace On Earth" (Thomas' Version – In the Mix)	2:21
16.	"Sweet Little Sheila" (Thomas' Version – In the Mix)	2:53
17.	"Ten Thousand Lonely Drums" (Thomas' Version – In the Mix)	2:46
18.	"Lonely Tears in Chinatown" (Thomas' Version – In the Mix)	3:02
19.	"In Shaire" (Thomas' Version – In the Mix)	3:10
20.	"Stranded in the Middle of Nowhere" (Thomas' Version – In the Mix)	3:18
21.	"The Angels Sing in New York City" (Thomas' Version – In the Mix)	2:59
22.	"Princess of the Night" (Thomas' Version – In the Mix)	3:25
23.	"Cherokee Highway" (New Bonus Track – In the Mix)	2:55
24.	"Voodoo Love" (New Bonus Track – In the Mix)	2:47
25.	"Geronimo's Cadillac" (Thomas' Version – Instrumental)	3:19
26.	"Riding on a White Swan" (Thomas' Version – Instrumental)	3:55
27.	"Give Me Peace on Earth" (Thomas' Version – Instrumental)	4:07
28.	"Sweet Little Sheila" (Thomas' Version – Instrumental)	3:23
29.	"Ten Thousand Lonely Drums" (Thomas' Version – Instrumental)	3:30
30.	"Lonely Tears in Chinatown" (Thomas' Version – Instrumental)	3:33
31.	"In Shaire" (Thomas' Version – Instrumental)	3:46
32.	"Stranded in the Middle Of Nowhere" (Thomas' Version – Instrumental)	4:34
33.	"The Angels Sing in New York City" (Thomas' Version – Instrumental)	3:35
34.	"Princess of the Night" (Thomas' Version – Instrumental)	4:05
35.	"Cherokee Highway" (New Bonus Track – Instrumental)	3:41
36.	"Voodoo Love" (New Bonus Track – Instrumental)	3:20
Total length:		2:04:47

== Charts ==
Chart performance for ...Sings Modern Talking - In The Middle Of Nowhere
Chart (2025)	Peak position
Austrian Albums (Ö3 Austria)	13
Belgian Albums (Ultratop Wallonia)	136
German Albums (Offizielle Top 100)	5
German Pop Albums (Offizielle Top 100)	1
Swiss Albums (Schweizer Hitparade)	40
