= ...Sings Modern Talking: Let's Talk About Love =

Studio album by Thomas Anders
- Released: 2 May 2025
- Recorded: 2025
- Genre: Pop
- Length: 2:07:38
- Label: Stars by Edel
- Producer: Christian Geller

Thomas Anders chronology
...Sings Modern Talking: The 1st Album (2025)	...Sings Modern Talking: Let's Talk About Love (2025)	...Sings Modern Talking: Ready for Romance (2025)

...Sings Modern Talking: Let's Talk About Love is the seventeenth studio album by German singer Thomas Anders, released on 2 May 2025 by Stars by Edel. It is the second album in the Thomas Anders ...sings Modern Talking series.

== Track listing ==
No.	Title	Length
1.	"Cheri Cheri Lady" (Thomas' Version)	3:45
2.	"With a Little Love" (Thomas' Version)	3:17
3.	"Wild Wild Water" (Thomas' Version)	4:23
4.	"You're the Lady of My Heart" (Thomas' Version)	3:41
5.	"Just Like an Angel" (Thomas' Version)	3:15
6.	"Heaven Will Know" (Thomas' Version)	4:14
7.	"Love Don't Live Here Anymore" (Thomas' Version)	4:35
8.	"Why Did You Do It Just Tonight" (Thomas' Version)	4:15
9.	"Don't Give Up" (Thomas' Version)	3:29
10.	"Let's Talk About Love" (Thomas' Version)	3:53
11.	"Love Society" (New Bonus Track)	3:40
12.	"Don’t Break My Soul" (New Bonus Track)	3:01
13.	"Cheri Cheri Lady" (Thomas' Version – In the Mix)	3:04
14.	"With a Little Love" (Thomas' Version – In the Mix)	2:54
15.	"Wild Wild Water" (Thomas' Version – In the Mix)	2:55
16.	"You're the Lady of My Heart" (Thomas' Version – In the Mix)	3:10
17.	"Just Like an Angel" (Thomas' Version – In the Mix)	2:48
18.	"Heaven Will Know" (Thomas' Version – In the Mix)	3:36
19.	"Love Don't Live Here Anymore" (Thomas' Version – In the Mix)	3:45
20.	"Why Did You Do It Just Tonight" (Thomas' Version – In the Mix)	2:35
21.	"Don't Give Up" (Thomas' Version – In the Mix)	2:52
22.	"Let's Talk About Love" (Thomas' Version – In the Mix)	3:12
23.	"Love Society" (New Bonus Track – In the Mix)	3:10
24.	"Don't Break My Soul" (New Bonus Track – In the Mix)	2:41
25.	"Cheri Cheri Lady" (Thomas' Version – Instrumental)	3:45
26.	"With a Little Love" (Thomas' Version – Instrumental)	3:17
27.	"Wild Wild Water" (Thomas' Version – Instrumental)	4:23
28.	"You're the Lady of My Heart" (Thomas' Version – Instrumental)	3:41
29.	"Just Like an Angel" (Thomas' Version – Instrumental)	3:15
30.	"Heaven Will Know" (Thomas' Version – Instrumental)	4:14
31.	"Love Don't Live Here Anymore" (Thomas' Version – Instrumental)	4:35
32.	"Why Did You Do It Just Tonight" (Thomas' Version – Instrumental)	4:15
33.	"Don't Give Up" (Thomas' Version – Instrumental)	3:29
34.	"Let's Talk About Love" (Thomas' Version – Instrumental)	3:53
35.	"Love Society" (New Bonus Track – Instrumental)	3:40
36.	"Don't Break My Soul" (New Bonus Track – Instrumental)	3:01
Total length:		2:07:38

== Charts ==
Chart performance for ...Sings Modern Talking: Let's Talk About Love
Chart (2025)	Peak position
Austrian Albums (Ö3 Austria)	7
German Albums (Offizielle Top 100)	5
German Pop Albums (Offizielle Top 100)	2
Swiss Albums (Schweizer Hitparade)	64
