= Friends 4 Ever (beFour album) =

Studio album by beFour
- Released: February 6, 2009
- Genre: Bubblegum pop
- Length: 47:28 (Standard edition)
- Label: Universal
- Producers: Christian Geller, Adam Bernau

BeFour chronology
We Stand United (2008)	Friends 4 Ever (2009)

Alternative Covers
- Limited Fan Edition

Singles from Friends 4 Ever
- 1. "No Limit" Released: January 16, 2009; 2. "Ding-A-Dong" Released: April 17, 2009

Friends 4 Ever is the fourth and final studio album by pop group beFour via Universal Records. It was released on February 6, 2009. The lead single from the album, "No Limit" was officially released in January 2009. The second single was "Ding-A-Dong".

== Production ==
For the creation of the titles, beFour got support from several songwriters and producers. All songs were produced by Christian Geller and Adam Bernau. Phil Wilde, Jean-Paul De Coster, Anita Dels and Ray Slijngaard wrote the text to No Limit; Ding-A-Dong was created by Dick Bakker, Eddy Ouwens and Will Luikinga.

== Release ==
BeFour's last album was produced in the studio Pop'N'Roll and released on February 6, 2009 in Germany, Austria and Switzerland. It rose to seventh place in the official album charts in Germany and stayed there for seven weeks. In Austria, the CD placed sixth and dropped out of the hit parade after nine weeks. In Switzerland, Friends 4 Ever came in ninth and dropped out of the charts after eleven weeks.

In addition, the album also appeared as a limited fan edition. This includes the four bonus tracks "Champion", "Halloween Party", "Undercover" and "A Note from beFour". Just like the three previous studio albums, this was produced by Christian Geller and Adam Bernau. All photos in the booklet of the album are by Nikolaj Georgiew.

== Single's ==
No limit

As the first single release of the album, the song No Limit appeared on January 16, 2009. The title made it to 21st place in Germany for nine weeks. In Austria and Switzerland, the piece placed 13th and 29th, respectively, and was represented in the official single charts for seven weeks. The video shoot was directed by Nikolai Georgiev. The assistant director was Maike Helbig. The production company Georgiew photography film produced the clip. They were already responsible for Lisa Bund and Daniel Schuhmacher. The production was managed by Kathrin Georgiew. The title was composed by Phil Wilde, Jean -Paul De Coster, Anita Dels and Ray Slijngaard. The single also contains the music video of the title.

Ding-a-Dong

Ding-A-Dong was released as a single release from the album and as the last single by beFour on April 17, 2009. In Germany, the title went into 61st place. He dropped out of the chart ranking after four weeks. The piece was chosen as the official theme song of the nationwide action "Fun in sports with beFour". The band then visited 200 schools nationwide. This title was written by Dick Bakker, Aria Eddy Ouwens and Will Luikinga. The song is a cover version of the Eurovision winning title from 1975.

== Track listing ==
=== Standard Edition ===
No.	Title	Length
1.	"No Limit"	3:26
2.	"Disco"	3:16
3.	"All I Ever Wanted"	3:19
4.	"Friends 4 Ever"	3:26
5.	"One Step To Infinity"	3:26
6.	"Ding-A-Dong"	3:31
7.	"(Love Is Like A) Mystery"	3:45
8.	"All Night Long"	3:04
9.	"Message Of Freedom"	3:45
10.	"Hear The Countdown Call"	3:41
11.	"Happy People"	3:41
12.	"All Around The Planet"	3:53

=== Limited Fan Edition Bonus Tracks ===
No.	Title	Length
13.	"Champion"	3:06
14.	"Halloween party"	3:03
15.	"Undercover"	3:05
16.	"A note from beFour"	4:41

== Charts ==
Chart (2009)	Peak position
Austria Album Charts	6
Media Control Charts	7
Swiss Album Charts	9
