= Magic Melody =

Magic Melody may refer to:

- "Magic Melody", a 1955 song by Les Paul and Mary Ford
- "Magic Melody" (beFour song), a 2007 song by German formation beFour, an adaptation of "Pesenka"
- "Magic Melody" (Crazy Frog song), a song by Crazy Frog from the album Crazy Hits
- Harvest Moon: Magical Melody, 2005 video game for the GameCube
