= ...Sings Modern Talking: Ready for Romance =

...Sings Modern Talking: Ready For Romance

Studio album by Thomas Anders
- Released: 20 June 2025
- Length: 2:10:13
- Label: Stars by Edel
- Producer: Christian Geller

Thomas Anders chronology
...Sings Modern Talking: Let's Talk About Love (2025)	...Sings Modern Talking: Ready For Romance (2025)	...Sings Modern Talking: In the Middle of Nowhere (2025)

...Sings Modern Talking: Ready For Romance is the eighteenth studio album by German singer Thomas Anders, released on 20 June 2025 by Stars by Edel. It is the third album in the Thomas Anders ...sings Modern Talking series.

== Track listing ==
No.	Title	Length
1.	"Brother Louie" (Thomas' Version)	3:53
2.	"Just We Two (Mona Lisa)" (Thomas' Version)	4:10
3.	"Lady Lai" (Thomas' Version)	4:20
4.	"Doctor For My Heart" (Thomas' Version)	3:20
5.	"Save Me - Don't Break Me" (Thomas' Version)	3:54
6.	"Atlantis Is Calling (S.O.S. For Love)" (Thomas' Version)	4:04
7.	"Keep Love Alive" (Thomas' Version)	3:44
8.	"Hey You" (Thomas' Version)	3:37
9.	"Angie's Heart" (Thomas' Version)	3:49
10.	"Only Love Can Break My Heart" (Thomas' Version)	3:49
11.	"Midnight Lover" (New Bonus Track)	3:23
12.	"Lonely Lady Blue" (New Bonus Track)	3:26
13.	"Brother Louie" (Thomas' Version – In The Mix)	2:56
14.	"Just We Two (Mona Lisa)" (Thomas' Version – In The Mix)	3:34
15.	"Lady Lai" (Thomas' Version – In The Mix)	4:28
16.	"Doctor For My Heart" (Thomas' Version – In The Mix)	2:55
17.	"Save Me - Don't Break Me" (Thomas' Version – In The Mix)	3:19
18.	"Atlantis Is Calling (S.O.S. For Love)" (Thomas' Version – In The Mix)	3:23
19.	"Keep Love Alive" (Thomas' Version – In The Mix)	3:20
20.	"Hey You" (Thomas' Version – In The Mix)	3:02
21.	"Angie's Heart" (Thomas' Version – In The Mix)	3:15
22.	"Only Love Can Break My Heart" (Thomas' Version – In The Mix)	3:06
23.	"Midnight Lover" (New Bonus Track – In The Mix)	2:58
24.	"Lonely Lady Blue" (New Bonus Track – In The Mix)	2:59
25.	"Brother Louie" (Thomas' Version – Instrumental)	3:53
26.	"Just We Two (Mona Lisa)" (Thomas' Version – Instrumental)	4:10
27.	"Lady Lai" (Thomas' Version – Instrumental)	4:20
28.	"Doctor For My Heart" (Thomas' Version – Instrumental)	3:20
29.	"Save Me - Don't Break Me" (Thomas' Version – Instrumental)	3:54
30.	"Atlantis Is Calling (S.O.S. For Love)" (Thomas' Version – Instrumental)	4:04
31.	"Keep Love Alive" (Thomas' Version – Instrumental)	3:44
32.	"Hey You" (Thomas' Version – Instrumental)	3:37
33.	"Angie's Heart" (Thomas' Version – Instrumental)	3:49
34.	"Only Love Can Break My Heart" (Thomas' Version – Instrumental)	3:49
35.	"Midnight Lover" (New Bonus Track – Instrumental)	3:23
36.	"Lonely Lady Blue" (New Bonus Track – Instrumental)	3:26
Total length:		2:10:13

== Charts ==
Chart performance for ...Sings Modern Talking - Ready For Romance
Chart (2025)	Peak position
Austrian Albums (Ö3 Austria)	14
Belgian Albums (Ultratop Wallonia)	114
German Albums (Offizielle Top 100)	4
German Pop Albums (Offizielle Top 100)	1
Swiss Albums (Schweizer Hitparade)	62
