= How Do You Do? (beFour song) =

Single by beFour

from the album All 4 One
- Released: 10 August 2007
- Recorded: 2007
- Genre: Pop, Europop, Euro-House, Electronic
- Length: 3:09
- Label: Universal
- Songwriter: Christian Geller
- Producers: Christian Geller, Adam Bernau

BeFour singles chronology
"Magic Melody" (2007)	"How Do You Do?" / "All 4 One" (2007)	"Little, Little Love" (2007)

How Do You Do? is the second single taken from beFour's debut album All 4 One, it was released as a double A-side single with "All 4 One", in Germany, Austria and Switzerland. The song is an English language cover of the Russian song Kanikuly by Bum. Covers of this song were also made by Boom and in Vietnamese by HKT.

== Formats and track listings ==
These are the formats and track listings of major single releases of "How Do You Do?".

Maxi CD single

1. How Do You Do? - 3:09
2. All 4 One - 3:40
3. All 4 One (Karaoke Version) - 3:40
4. Video - 3:40

Digital Download

1. How Do You Do? - 3:09
2. All 4 One - 3:40
3. All 4 One (Karaoke Version) - 3:40

== Charts ==
=== Weekly charts ===
Charts (2007)	Peak position
Austria (Ö3 Austria Top 40)	5
Eurochart Hot 100 Singles	30
Germany (GfK)	12
Switzerland (Schweizer Hitparade)	11

=== Year-end charts ===
Chart (2007)	Position
Austria (Ö3 Austria Top 40)	53
Germany (Official German Charts)	83
Switzerland (Schweizer Hitparade)	90

== Cover versions ==
Girl band Boom produced a cover of the song "How Do You Do" in 2009. As of 2026 the music video of the cover song has over 10 million views on youtube, surpassing the view count of the beFour song.
Vietnamese boy group HKT produced a cover version of the song Trú mưa in 2012.
