= BeFour =

Late 2000s German pop group

beFour
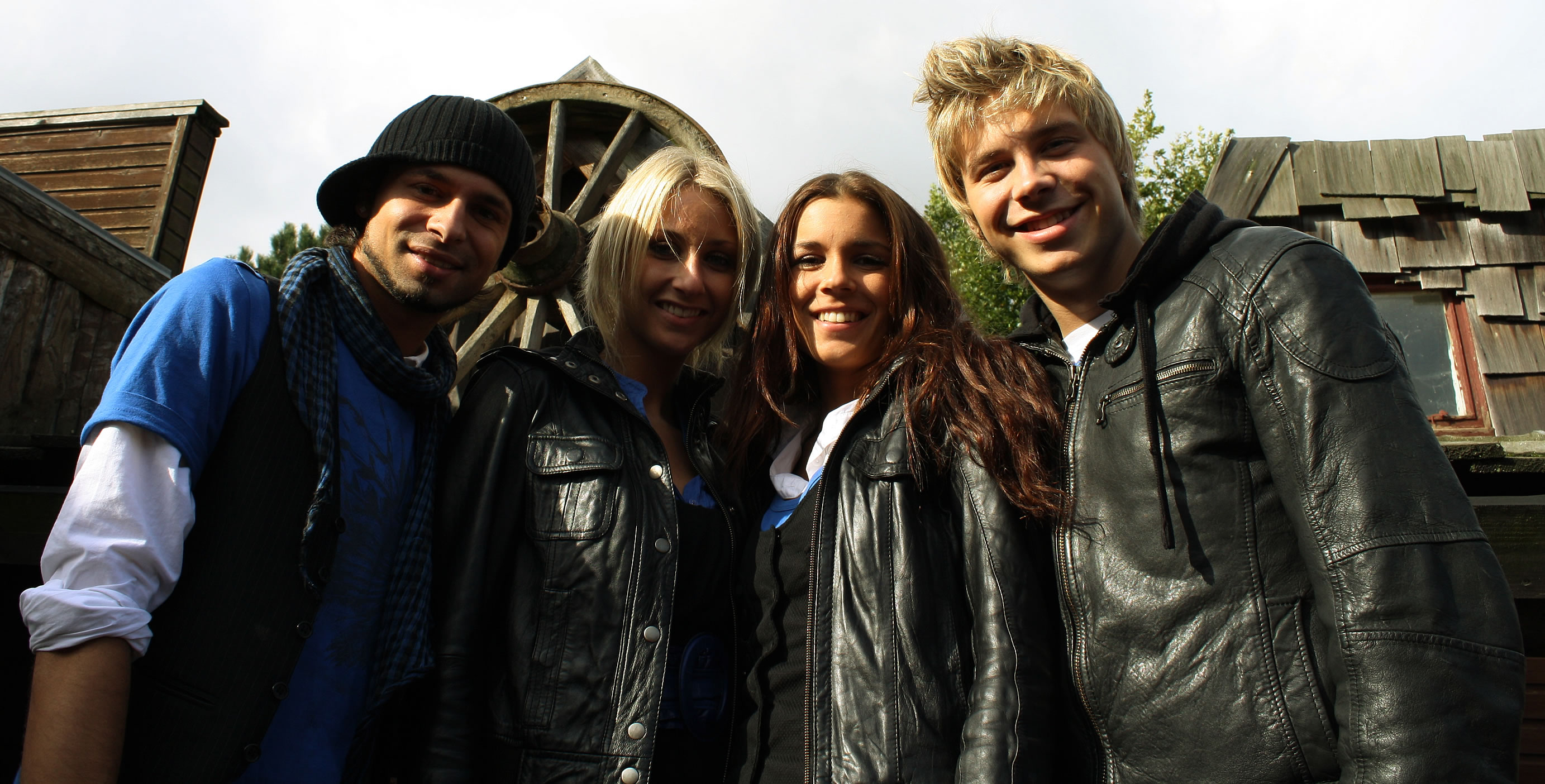
- beFour in 2008

Background information
- Origin: Cologne, Germany
- Genres: Pop, Eurodance
- Years active: 2007–2010
- Label: edel music
- Members: Manou; Alina B. Dan M. Angel
- Website: beFour.de

beFour was a German Eurodance group founded in Cologne. They have had a string of hits stretching from 2007 until 2009. The band's repertoire contains a number of revamped adaptations of well-known songs. The band has released 4 albums in total. The band parted ways in December 2010.

== History ==
=== Beginnings ===
In 2007, music producer Christian Geller was looking for a pop group for the German TV network Super RTL. By winning a hip-hop championship, he became aware of Angel Garcia Arjona and introduced him to the concept. Shortly thereafter, he presented himself with his friends Manou, Alina and Dan in Christian Geller's studio, and after a dance demonstration, the band was put together in this formation. In May 2007, the four moved to a shared flat in Cologne.

The first three months after its founding were documented in the Star Diary on Super RTL, for the television show beFour: Das Star-Tagebuch ("The Star Diary") for three months with ten minutes of the band's life shown daily, in addition to sound recordings for the first album were photoshoots, dance lessons and video shoots.

=== Career ===
After the release of the debut album All 4 One and the single "Magic Melody", a cover version of the song "Around The World" by ATC, whose have some different lyrics, and based in the song "Pesenka", originally performed by the Russian band Ruki Vverh! in 1998. The song produced by Christian Geller and Adam Bernau, followed promo appearances. More singles have been released, including "How Do You Do?" and "Little, Little Love". BeFour's first big appearance was at The Dome 43 in Hamburg on 31 August 2007. As part of the RTL program The Ultimate Chartshow, the band was awarded the Golden Record for "All 4 One". In addition, the DVD beFour - The Movie! was released.

2007 saw the beginning of the production of the second studio album, Hand in Hand (The Winter Album). It appeared on 17 November 2007. The music video for the single "Hand in Hand" was shot in Phantasialand near Cologne. In March 2008 We Stand United, the band's third studio album, was released. The single "Live Your Dream" was also the German title song for the soundtrack of the movie Horton Hears a Hu!. In summer, a second season of the Star diary was broadcast, which consisted as well as the first of more than 90 episodes. In June the band launched a concert tour. Christian Petru appeared in the pre-program. End of October 2008, the album Hand in Hand (The Winter Album) appeared in a new edition.

On 16 January 2009, the single "No Limit" was released, a remake of the hit by 2 Unlimited. The fourth album Friends 4 Ever was released on 6 February 2009. The single "Ding-A-Dong", released on 17 April 2009, climbed to # 61 in Germany for the first week. On 8 December 2010 the group announced the break-up.

== Band members ==
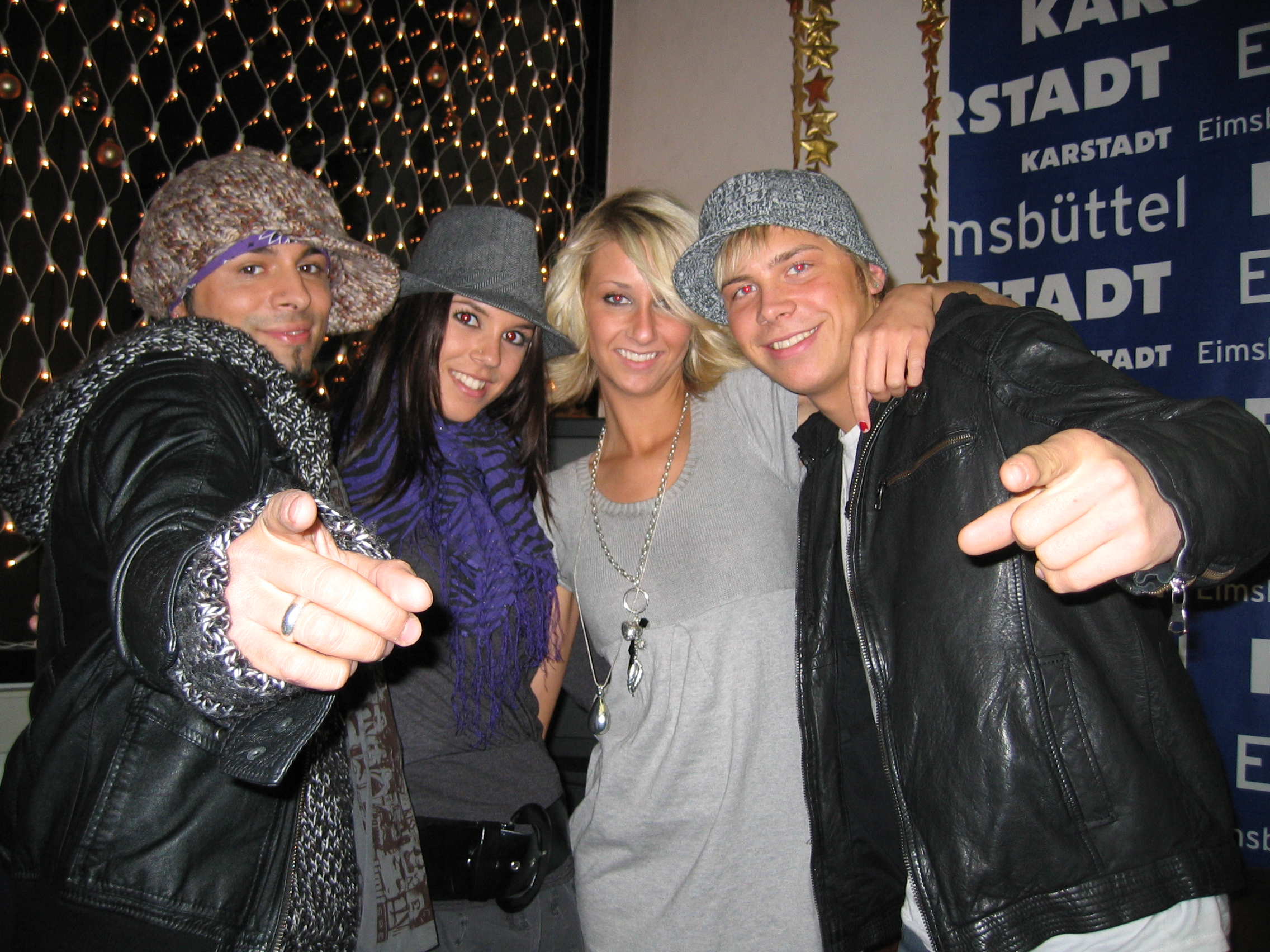
From left to right: Angel, Manou, Alina and Dan

=== Manou ===
Manuela "Manou" Oeschger (born 18 February 1984 in Wil (Aargau), Switzerland) had her first stage experience when she was 18. In New York, she studied dance, acting and music.

=== Alina ===
Alina Bock (born 2 November 1984 in Geilenkirchen, Germany) took piano lessons from the age of 6 and is an actress-in-training. She got her start with her own TV show on the German Disney Channel and as part of the Euro pop band "beFour". After touring Europe for years, gathering multiple platinum and golden records, and an endless pool of character inspiration, she made her way to Los Angeles and has studied and performed sketch and improv comedy all over town, including UCB, Groundlings, iO, and The Pack Theater. Some of Alina's impressive American TV credits include "Stressed Out Caucasian Mom", "Tired Caucasian Mom", "Jim & Helen Forever", "Adverse Possession", "Mary Mary & Some Other People", "Successful People", and as the bumbling FBI agent Calista Flockhart in the hilarious smash hit YouTube web series "Bad Boy". Alina works as a voiceover actor in both English and German and has lent her voice to hundreds of movies, commercials, and animated shows including the German version of 20th century Fox's Dr. Seuss's Horton Hears A Who. She also makes videos on TikTok and Instagram sharing her experiences growing up in the 90s.

=== Dan ===
Daniel "Dan" Mollermann (born 17 December 1987 in Berlin) is a German actor. Before joining beFour he was a competitive athlete.

=== Angel ===
Angel Garcia Arjona (born 21 February 1982 in Velbert) is a German-Spanish dancer and trained banker. He had several appearances in music videos, for example Jessica Wahls (known from No Angels) - "Du bist wie Ich" ("You are Like Me").

== Criticism ==
In 2009, the band was criticized for hidden and allegedly prohibited advertising appearances in schools. This happened for the company ASPECTA, a subsidiary of the insurance group Talanx. The flyer distributed at the event said it was the "hit-and-run and unique Befour gift that is nowhere to be found: a CD of unpublished songs and a video message from your stars and a great keychain." For this, the parents have to provide their address and agree by signing to be contacted by an insurance broker ASPECTA Lebensversicherung AG for the purpose of making an appointment for a consultation.

The principals of the schools were only told that they had the "luck" that the tour route of the band would lead past them and the band is therefore happy to make an appearance. Subsequent to the school packages were sent with flyers, which were to be distributed to the children. For heads of schools who disagreed with the distribution, the performance was canceled at short notice because of "lack of support". In particular, it is criticized that children would be abused as "door openers". Parents would have to refuse the children the "gifts" if they do not want to hold sales talks with employees of the insurance group.

== Discography ==
=== Albums ===
Year	Title	Chart ranking		
Year	Title	GER	AUT	SWI
2007	All 4 One: Release date: 13 July 2007; Sales: +200,000 (Platinum record)	1	2	1
2007	Hand in Hand (The Winter Album): Release date: 16 November 2007; Sales: +100,000 (Golden record)	10	3	13
2008	We Stand United: Release date: 18 April 2008; Sales: +100.000 (Golden record)	10	4	10
2009	Friends 4 Ever: Release date: 6 February 2009; Sales: +200,000 (Platinum record)	7	6	9

=== Singles ===
Year	Title	Chart ranking				Album
Year	Title	GER	AUT	SWI	EUR	Album
2007	"Magic Melody"	16	11	14	49	All 4 One
2007	"How Do You Do?" / "All 4 One"	12	5	11	30	All 4 One
2007	"Little, Little Love"	27	30	27	176	All 4 One
2007	"Hand in Hand"	27	8	73	152	Hand in Hand (The Winter Album)
2008	"Live Your Dream"	16	17	29	-	We Stand United
2009	"No Limit"	21	13	29	72	Friends 4 Ever
2009	"Ding-A-Dong"	61	-	-	-	Friends 4 Ever

=== Other songs ===
- 2009: "Happy Holiday"
- 2009: "Come Fly With Me"

== DVDs ==
- beFour: der Film! (Release date: 28 September 2007)

== Awards ==
- Platinum record for the album All 4 One
- Golden record for the album Hand In Hand (The Winter Album)
- Golden record for the album We Stand United
