= Hand in Hand (The Winter Album) =

Hand In Hand (The Winter Album)

Studio album by beFour
- Released: 11 November 2007
- Genre: Bubblegum pop
- Length: 46:37
- Label: Universal
- Producer: Christian Geller, Adam Bernau

BeFour chronology
All 4 One (2007)	Hand In Hand (The Winter Album) (2007)	We Stand United (2008)

Singles from Hand in Hand
- 1. "Hand in Hand" Released: 11 November 2007

Hand in Hand - The Winter Album is a Christmas album and the second of the German pop group beFour. It was released on 16 November 2007 in German-speaking countries, sold more than 100,000 copies and was awarded gold in Germany. The lead single from the album, "Hand in Hand" was officially released on 9 November 2007.

== Production ==
All Tracks of the album were produced by Christian Geller, who was already active for the debut album Elle'ments of the girlgroup No Angels. The lyrics of all the songs, with the exception of Crying Heart and If You Wanna Know, were also written by Geller. The songs were mixed by Adam Bernau. The song Crying Heart was written by Dieter Bohlen. Rikard Löfgren produced the sixth track of the album, If You Wanna Know.

== Release ==
The Christmas album was released in Germany, Austria and Switzerland on 16 November 2007. In Germany, the longplayer made it to position ten on the album charts. In Austria, the album placed in third place. In Switzerland, the CD made it to 13th place and stayed on the charts for 13 weeks. In 2007, Hand in Hand (The Winter Album) was certified gold in Germany.

== Singles ==
As the only single release appeared on November 9, the song Hand in Hand, which was produced by Geller. The filming of the video led the film Mark Feuerstake. It was recorded in Phantasialand. The song made it to # 27 in the charts in Germany; for a total of seven weeks. In Austria, hand in hand took eighth place and was able to stay there for nine weeks. In Switzerland, the piece reached 73rd place for a week

== Track listing ==
No.	Title	Length
1.	"Hand in Hand"	4:04
2.	"Winter Dream"	3:34
3.	"Sweet Little Bells"	3:05
4.	"Crying Heart"	3:45
5.	"Shooting Star"	3:41
6.	"If You Wanna Know"	3:00
7.	"Sometimes Dreams Come True"	3:34
8.	"Sunshine In December"	3:24
9.	"Winter In My Heart"	3:29
10.	"Crystal Wonderland"	3:41
11.	"Winterdream (Phantasialand Version)"	3:36
12.	"Sometimes Dreams Come True (feat. Lisa)"	3:33
13.	"Hand in Hand (Piano Version)"	4:01

== Charts ==
=== Weekly charts ===
Chart (2007–2008)	Peak position
Austrian Albums (Ö3 Austria)	3
German Albums (Offizielle Top 100)	10
Swiss Albums (Schweizer Hitparade)	13

=== Year-end charts ===
Chart (2007)	Position
Swiss Albums (Schweizer Hitparade)	96
