= Little, Little Love =

Single by beFour

from the album All 4 One
- Released: September 14, 2007
- Recorded: 2007
- Genre: Pop
- Length: 3:13
- Label: Universal
- Songwriter: Christian Geller
- Producers: Christian Geller, Adam Bernau

BeFour singles chronology
"How Do You Do?" / "All 4 One" (2007)	"Little, Little Love" (2007)	"Hand In Hand" (2007)

"Little, Little Love" is the third and final single taken from beFour's second debut album All 4 One, in Germany, Austria and Switzerland.

== Formats and track listings ==
These are the formats and track listings of major single releases of "Little, Little Love".

Maxi CD single

1. "Little, Little Love" (Single version) – 3:13
2. "I Wanna Be Like You" - 3:36
3. "Little Little Love" (Karaoke version)- 3:13
4. "All4One Album-Medley" - 2:48

Digital Download

1. "Little, Little Love" (Single version) – 3:13
2. "I Wanna Be Like You" - 3:36
3. "Little Little Love" (Karaoke version)- 3:13
4. "All4One Album-Medley" - 2:48

== Charts ==
Chart (2009)	Peak position
Austrian Singles Chart	30
Eurochart Hot 100 Singles	176
German Singles	27
Swiss Singles Chart	27
