= Gayazovs Brothers =

Russian musical duo

The Gayazovs Brothers, stylized as GAYAZOV$ BROTHER$, are a Russian music group. The group is made of two brothers: Timur and Ilyas Gayazov. Their music is released through the label Warner Music Russia.

Timur is a singer-songwriter. Ilyas is singer-songwriter and producer.

== Discography ==
«Кредо»
Review scores
Source	Rating
InterMedia	6/10 stars

External videos
- YouTube • «Кредо» (2018) • «До встречи на танцполе» (2019)

=== Albums ===
No.	Title
1	«Верните в моду любовь чистую»: Released: 15 February 2017; Label: Warner Music Russia
2	«Кредо»: Released: 15 March 2019; Label: Warner Music Russia
3	«Пошла жара»: Released: 18 June 2021; Label: Warner Music Russia

=== Singles ===
Year	Title	Charts			References
Year	Title	CIS			References
Year	Title	TopHit Top Radio & YouTube Hits	TopHit Top Radio Hits	TopHit Top YouTube Hits	References
2014	«Only You»				Digital download
2015	«Верните в моду любовь»				Digital download
2015	«Ты красивая, как глаза матери»				Digital download
2016	«Вены резались сами»				Digital download
2018	«Кредо»	289	322	—	Digital download
2018	«Карантин»				Digital download
2018	«Клубника в шоколаде»				Digital download
2018	«Ищи другого»				Digital download
2019	«Эликсир молодости»				Digital download
2019	«Чёрная пантера»				Digital download
2019	«Упс, Салам!»				Digital download
2019	«Самбука, Бомбей»				Digital download
2019	«Порностар»				Digital download
2019	«Коктейль Молотова»				Digital download
2019	«Заполонила»				Digital download
2019	«Галактические танцы»				Digital download
2019	«Вкл / выкл»				Digital download
2019	«Алко по акции»				Digital download
2019	«До встречи на танцполе»	20	149	14	Digital download
2019	«Пьяный туман»	125	697	19	Digital download
2019	«Увезите меня на Дип-хаус»	34	92	4	Digital download
2020	«По синей грусти»				Digital download
2020	«Хедшот»				Digital download
2020	«Я, ты и море»				Digital download
2020	«Уедем в Марокко» (feat. NETU$IL)				Digital download
2020	«Ты круче, чем...»				Digital download
2020	«Плачь, но танцуй»				Digital download
2020	«Позови на движ»				Digital download
2021	«Ради танцпола» (feat. Руки Вверх)				Digital download
2021	«Пошла жара» (feat. Filatov & Karas)				Album single
2021	«Малиновая лада»				Digital download
2021	«Новогодняя»				Digital download
2022	«Синий иней»				Digital download
2022	«Девичник»				Digital download
2022	«Спасай мою пятницу»				Digital download
2022	«Фаина»				Digital download
2023	«Любовь-зараза»				Digital download
2023	«Июль, Анапа»				Digital download

== Prizes ==
Year	Awards	Category	Results	Refs.
2020	«Новое радио Awards»	Лучшая группа	Nominated	
2020	«Новое радио Awards»	Прорыв года	Nominated	
2022	«Жара Music Awards»	Фан-клуб года	Won	
2023	«Жара Music Awards»	Группа года	Won	
