= The Disco Boys =

German house music DJ and production duo

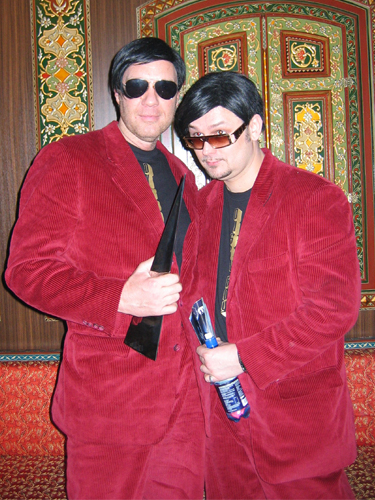
- The Disco Boys at the Dance Music Award ceremony 2005 in Hannover

Background information
- Origin: Hamburg, Germany
- Genres: House, electro house, disco
- Occupation(s): DJ, producer, remixer
- Years active: 2001–present
- Labels: Superstar Recordings
- Members: Raphael Krickow; Gordon Hollenga
- Website: Discoboys.de; Myspace

The Disco Boys are a German house music DJ and production duo from Hamburg, which consists of Raphael Krickow and Gordon Hollenga. They play a mixture of disco classics and modern house songs. The Disco Boys have played at the German Love Parade, Nature One, and the Mayday and Life Ball festivals in Austria. Even though the group was founded in 1995, they did not release their first single until 2001. Their acts as DJs take place around the world and include China.

== Musical career ==
The Disco Boys were especially commercially successful with cover versions or productions with longer quotes or samples from other songs. Their first hit was "Born to Be Alive" from the album Volume 1, a new version of the hit by Patrick Hernandez from 1979. It was originally voiced by Roberto Blanco.

Their most popular single was "For You" released in 2004, which used longer passages from the song of the same name by Manfred Mann's Earth Band and was in turn based on the song by Bruce Springsteen. It was co-produced by Syke'N'Sugarstarr. In the seasons of 2008/09 and 2009/10 it was used by the German soccer club Borussia Dortmund as an entrance song. "For You" first reached the charts in 2005 and was re-published two years later. From 2007 to 2010 the single was repeatedly placed in the German charts, interrupted only because of a then existing rule excluding low-placed songs. Still, the song managed to reach a total of 93 weeks in the charts, with place 17 being the highest position. In 2010, over three years after its publication, "For You" reached Platinum in Germany.

"Hey St. Peter" is a cover version of a song by Flash and the Pan from 1977. The single managed to reach position 8 of the Finnish single-charts. The single "B-B-B-Baby" quotes the hit "You Ain't Seen Nothing Yet" by Bachman-Turner Overdrive from 1974.

Due to the tenth anniversary of the Disco Boys, the "Discofestival" was established in 2005, which took place yearly in Kassel until 2012.

In 2007, 2008 and 2009 the Disco Boys published further club hits, without using samples of other artists. "I Love You So", "What You Want", "Shadows" and other singles were published, accompanied by existing mix compilations, and reached high chart positions in Germany. Since June 23, 2010 the single "Love Tonight" is available. It is delivered in a package of remixes of the song, by Jay Frog, SONO and the Tune Brothers for example.

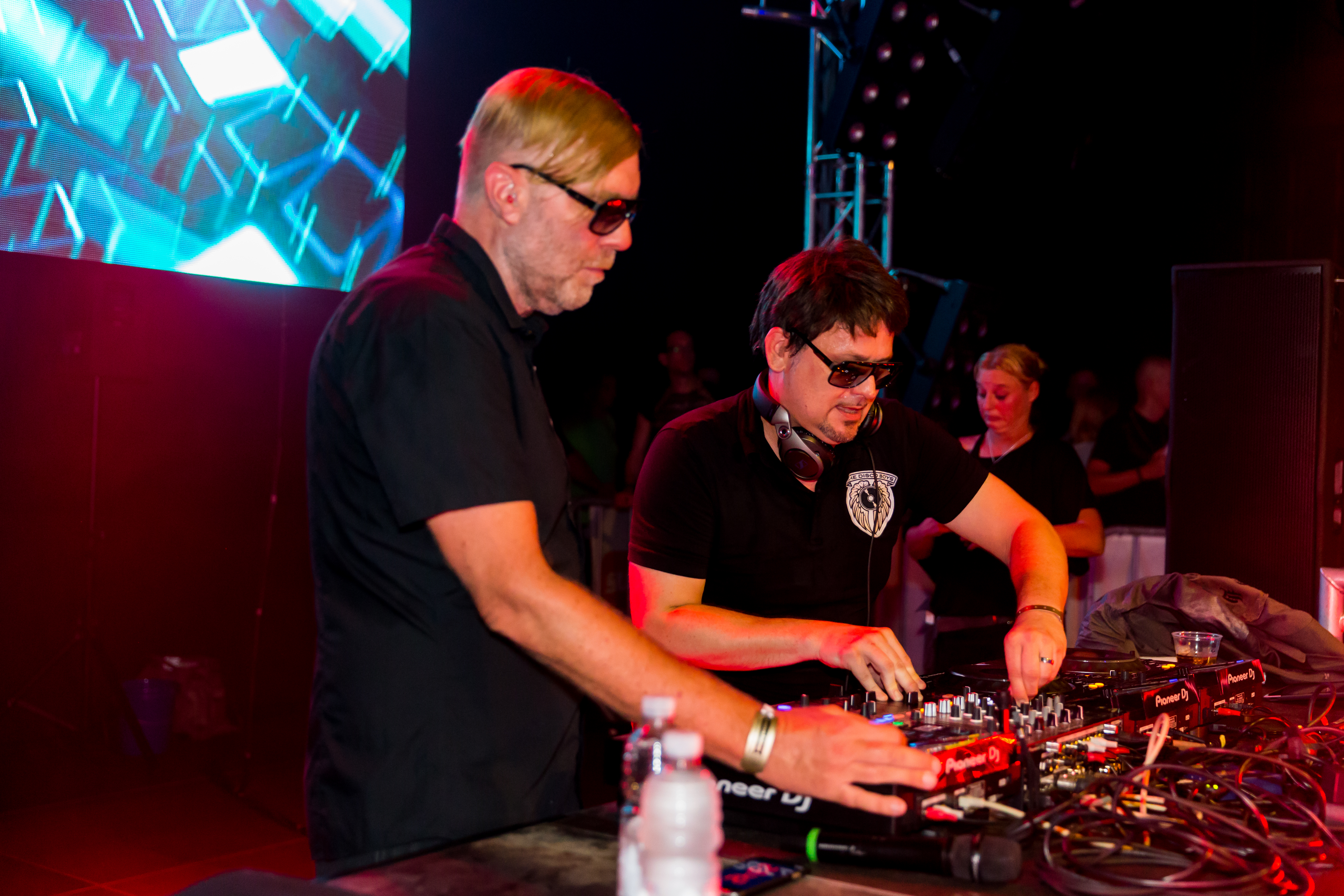
The Disco Boys in Mannheim at Sunshine Live (2016)

Their most successful single since "For You" was published in 2012: "Around The World", originally by ATC and containing vocal elements from the original song, due to permission by its creator Alex Christensen. The Disco Boys have also been renowned as re-mixers and have worked with songs by the artists and bands Rosenstolz, Ich + Ich, MIA. and Roger Sanchez among others. Their cover of "If I Can't Have You" by the Bee Gees was approved by the Gibb brothers themselves.

Each year the duo publishes a self-titled mix-compilation with the best tracks from their DJ-sets. This was first published in 2001 as a double album. Since 2012 it consists of three mixes on three CDs. The popular series reached high chart positions and especially the first two issues are still being traded for high prices on eBay. For each new volume the Disco Boys produce at least one single.

== Discography ==
=== Albums ===
- 2001: Volume 1 (silver cover)
- 2002: Volume 2 (orange cover)
- 2003: Volume 3 (green cover)
- 2004: Volume 4 (yellow cover)
- 2005: Volume 5 (white cover)
- 2006: Volume 6 (black cover)
- 2007: Volume 7 (violet cover)
- 2007: Volume 8 (red cover)
- 2008: Volume 9 (blue cover)
- 2010: Volume 10 (gold cover)
- 2011: Volume 11 (purple cover)
- 2012: Volume 12 (rainbow cover)
- 2013: Volume 13 (silver cover)
- 2014: Volume 14 (yellow/black cover)
- 2015: Volume 15 (grey/ pink cover)
- 2016: Volume 16
- 2018: Volume 17 (black/pink cover)
- 2019: Volume 18 (white/turquoise cover)

=== Singles ===
- 2001: "Born to Be Alive" (The Disco Boys feat. RB)
- 2003: "We Came to Dance"
- 2004: "Here on My Own"
- 2004: "For You" (The Disco Boys feat. Manfred Mann's Earth Band)
- 2006: "Hey St. Peter"
- 2006: "B-B-B-Baby"
- 2007: "What You Want"
- 2007: "I Love You So"
- 2007: "If I Can't Have You" (Bee Gees vs. The Disco Boys)
- 2007: "Start All Over Again"
- 2008: "Shadows"
- 2010: "I Surrender"
- 2012: "Around the World"

=== Remixes ===
- "Lunatic" (Club Mix)
- Jacky S – "Knock on Wood" (Abfahrt, 05/02)
- Bootsy Collins – "Play with Bootsy" (Eastwest, 07/03)
- Marylin's Boys – "I'll Give You the Stars" (Edel, 10/03)
- 2Black – "Waves of Luv" (Kontor, 01/05)
- Carolina Márquez – "The Killer's Song" (Kontor, 02/05)
- The Lovefreaks – "Shine" (Kontor, 04/05)
- Hacienda – "Makin' Luv" (Ministry of Sound, 08/05)
- Discoblaster – "Fading" (Universal, 09/05)
- Kujay Dada – "Let It Play" (Tiger Records, 10/05)
- Lost Daze – "Illusions" (X-Mix US)
- The Freemasons – "Love on My Mind" (Loaded UK)
- Superfunk – "Lucky Star 2005" (Kontor)
- Master Blaster – "Since You've Been Gone" (Clubland)
- Tapedeck Projects – "TKKG" (Sugaspin, 01/06)
- Jestofunk – "Say It Again" (Kontor, 02/06)
- Bee Gees - "If I Can't Have You" (Warner, 11/07)
- Marquess - "Vayamos compañeros" (Starwatch Music, 06/08)
- September - "Satellites" (Kontor, 08/09)
