= ...Sings Modern Talking: The 1st Album =

Studio album by Thomas Anders
- Released: 7 March 2025
- Label: Stars by Edel
- Producer: Christian Geller

Thomas Anders chronology
Cosmic (2021)	...Sings Modern Talking: The 1st Album (2025)	...Sings Modern Talking: Let's Talk About Love (2025)

...Sings Modern Talking: The 1st Album is the sixteenth studio album by German singer Thomas Anders. It was released by Stars by Edel on 7 March 2025 and produced by Christian Geller. The album is a re-recording of Modern Talking's The 1st Album (1985).

== Track listing ==
No.	Title	Length
1.	"You're My Heart, You're My Soul" (Thomas' Version)	3:36
2.	"You Can Win If You Want" (Thomas' Version)	3:42
3.	"There's Too Much Blue in Missing You" (Thomas' Version)	4:53
4.	"Diamonds Never Made a Lady" (Thomas' Version)	4:11
5.	"The Night Is Yours – The Night Is Mine" (Thomas' Version)	5:29
6.	"Do You Wanna" (Thomas' Version)	4:27
7.	"Lucky Guy" (Thomas' Version)	3:35
8.	"One in a Million" (Thomas' Version)	4:01
9.	"Bells of Paris" (Thomas' Version)	4:30
10.	"Don't Fly Too High" (new bonus track)	3:25
11.	"Hold Me Tight in the Night" (new bonus track)	3:13
12.	"Catch Me I'm Falling" (new bonus track)	3:18
13.	"You're My Heart, You're My Soul" (Thomas' Version – In the Mix)	2:58
14.	"You Can Win If You Want" (Thomas' Version – In the Mix)	2:54
15.	"There's Too Much Blue in Missing You" (Thomas' Version – In the Mix)	2:17
16.	"Diamonds Never Made a Lady" (Thomas' Version – In the Mix)	2:50
17.	"The Night Is Yours – The Night Is Mine" (Thomas' Version – In the Mix)	3:12
18.	"Do You Wanna" (Thomas' Version – In the Mix)	3:53
19.	"Lucky Guy" (Thomas' Version – In the Mix)	2:57
20.	"One in a Million" (Thomas' Version – In the Mix)	3:22
21.	"Bells of Paris" (Thomas' Version – In the Mix)	3:42
22.	"Don't Fly Too High" (new bonus track – In the Mix)	2:43
23.	"Hold Me Tight in the Night" (new bonus track – In the Mix)	2:46
24.	"Catch Me I'm Falling" (new bonus track – In the Mix)	2:37
25.	"You're My Heart, You're My Soul" (Thomas' Version – Instrumental)	3:36
26.	"You Can Win If You Want" (Thomas' Version – Instrumental)	3:42
27.	"There's Too Much Blue in Missing You" (Thomas' Version – Instrumental)	4:53
28.	"Diamonds Never Made a Lady" (Thomas' Version – Instrumental)	4:11
29.	"The Night Is Yours – The Night Is Mine" (Thomas' Version – Instrumental)	5:29
30.	"Do You Wanna" (Thomas' Version – Instrumental)	4:27
31.	"Lucky Guy" (Thomas' Version – Instrumental)	3:35
32.	"One in a Million" (Thomas' Version – Instrumental)	4:01
33.	"Bells of Paris" (Thomas' Version – Instrumental)	4:30
34.	"Don't Fly Too High" (new bonus track – Instrumental)	3:25
35.	"Hold Me Tight in the Night" (new bonus track – Instrumental)	3:13
36.	"Catch Me I'm Falling" (new bonus track – Instrumental)	3:18

== Charts ==
Chart performance for ...Sings Modern Talking: The 1st Album
Chart (2025)	Peak position
Austrian Albums (Ö3 Austria)	11
Belgian Albums (Ultratop Wallonia)	140
German Albums (Offizielle Top 100)	5
German Pop Albums (Offizielle Top 100)	3
Swiss Albums (Schweizer Hitparade)	54
