= Live Your Dream =

Single by beFour

from the album We Stand United
- Released: May 14, 2008
- Recorded: 2008
- Genre: Pop
- Length: 3:45
- Label: Universal
- Songwriter(s): Christian Geller
- Producer(s): Christian Geller, Adam Bernau

BeFour singles chronology
"Hand In Hand" (2007)	"Live Your Dream" (2008)	"No Limit" (2009)

"Live Your Dream" is the first single taken from beFour's third studio album We Stand United, in Germany, Austria and Switzerland . As of March 28, the song has officially entered the German Singles Chart. The Song was the theme song of the German release of the movie Horton hears a Who

== Formats and track listings ==
These are the formats and track listings of major single releases of "Live Your Dream".

Maxi CD single

1. "Live Your Dream" (Single version) – 3:44
2. "Live Your Dream" (Extended Version) - 5:25
3. "Hand In Hand" (Hit-Mix 2008) - 5:15
4. "Live Your Dream" (Video) - 3:44

Digital Download

1. "Live Your Dream" (Single version) – 3:44
2. "Live Your Dream" (Extended Version) - 5:25
3. "Hand In Hand" (Hit-Mix 2008)- 5:15
4. "Live Your Dream" (Video) - 3:44

== Charts ==
Chart (2009)	Peak position
Austrian Singles Chart	17
German Singles	16
Swiss Singles Chart	29
