= Hand in Hand (2010 film) =

Taiwanese documentary

Hand in Hand (Chinese: 牽阮的手) is a Taiwanese documentary co-directed by the couple Chuang Yi-tseng and Yen Lan-chuan. The film took 5 years shooting, completed in 2010, and theatrically released in 2011.

== Synopsis ==
In the conservative Taiwan of the 1950s, a second-year student at Tainan Girls' Senior High School named Tian Meng-shu from Shanshang Township, Tainan County, was expected by her parents to become a judge. Her parents arranged for Dr. Tian Chao-ming, who had returned from studying in Japan and was acquainted with the family, to provide her with after-school tutoring. Despite a 16-year age gap, the two developed a shared interest and fell in love. Because of the significant age gap and the fact that they shared the same surname were considered taboos, their parents strongly opposed this relationship. Tian Meng-shu and Tian Chao-ming decided to elope.

As a physician for human rights, Tian Chao-ming, who had experienced the 228 Incident, and Tian Meng-shu risked their lives to rescue political prisoners during martial law period, including strangers like Hsieh Tsung-min. They also took care of members of opposition parties and their families, participated in opposition movements and street protests.

Known as "Tian Dad" and "Tian Mom," the couple witnessed the era that democratic movements is rising in, including the Kaohsiung Incident, the 520 Farmer's Movement, the abolition of Article 100 of the Criminal Code, and other. The two shared a deep and sincere love that transcended the challenges of the times and the ups and downs of life until Tian Chao-ming died in 2010 after years of suffering from a stroke. Chen Chu, a prominent figure in Taiwan's democratic movement who came from an opposition background, praised Tian Meng-shu and Tian Chao-ming as the "Mother of Taiwanese Political Prisoners."

== Awards and festivals ==
Festival screenings and awards won:

- 2010 Taiwan International Documentary Festival - Grand Prize of Taiwan Award
- 2010 South Taiwan Film Festival - Grand Prize
- 2010 Taipei Film Festival
- 2012 Golden Horse Awards - Nomination of Best Documentary
