= All 4 One (beFour album) =

Studio album by beFour
- Released: 13 July 2007
- Recorded: 2006–2007
- Genre: Pop, dance, schlager
- Length: 45:32
- Label: Universal
- Producer: Christian Geller, Adam Bernau

BeFour chronology
All 4 One (2007)	Hand In Hand (The Winter Album) (2007)

Singles from Friends 4 Ever
- 1. "Magic Melody" Released: 14 June 2007; 2. "All 4 One" Released: 10 August 2007; 3. "Little, Little Love" Released: 14 September 2007

"All 4 One" is the debut album by the German Europop group beFour.

== Track listing ==
All 4 One track listing
No.	Title	Length
1.	"Magic Melody"	3:37
2.	"Come Fly with Me"	3:35
3.	"Little, Little Love"	3:09
4.	"All 4 One"	3:41
5.	"Cosmic Ride"	3:50
6.	"Zero Gravity"	2:59
7.	"A New Generation"	3:30
8.	"Everybody"	4:01
9.	"Fly Around the World"	3:46
10.	"Cherry Babe"	3:43
11.	"Red (The Color of Love)"	3:33
12.	"Bye Bye Baby"	3:16
13.	"Magic Melody (Karaoke Version)"	3:37
Total length:		45:32

== Charts and certifications ==
=== Weekly charts ===
Chart (2007)	Peak position
Austrian Albums (Ö3 Austria)	2
German Albums (Offizielle Top 100)	1
Swiss Albums (Schweizer Hitparade)	1

=== Year-end charts ===
Chart (2007)	Position
Austrian Albums (Ö3 Austria)	35
German Albums (Offizielle Top 100)	24
Swiss Albums (Schweizer Hitparade)	38

=== Certifications ===
Country	Certifications (sales thresholds)
Germany	Platinum
