= Hand in Hand (beFour song) =

Single by beFour

from the album Hand in Hand (The Winter album)
- Released: November 9, 2007
- Recorded: 2007
- Genre: Pop
- Length: 3:59
- Label: Universal
- Songwriter(s): Christian Geller
- Producer(s): Christian Geller, Adam Bernau

BeFour singles chronology
"Little, Little Love" (2007)	"Hand in Hand" (2007)	"Live Your Dream" (2008)

"Hand In Hand" is the first single taken from beFour's second studio album "Hand In Hand," in Germany, Austria and Switzerland.

== Formats and track listings ==
These are the formats and track listings of major single releases of "Hand In Hand."

CD single

1. "Hand In Hand" (Radio Version) - 4:02
2. "Because It's Christmas" - 3:16
3. "Hand In Hand" (Karaoke Version) - 4:03
4. "Grußbotschaft" - 1:33

Digital Download

1. "Hand In Hand" - 3:59
2. "Because It's Christmas" - 3:16
3. "Hand In Hand" (Karaoke Version) - 4:03
4. "Grußbotschaft" - 1:33

=== Charts ===
Charts (2007)	Peak position
Austria (Ö3 Austria Top 40)	8
Germany (GfK)	27
Switzerland (Schweizer Hitparade)	73
