= La La La (Luis Alberto Spinetta and Fito Páez album) =

La la la is a 1986 double album in Spanish by Argentinian musicians Luis Alberto Spinetta and Fito Páez.

== Track listing ==
CD 1

1. Folly Verghet (Páez)
2. Instant-táneas (Páez)
3. Tengo un mono (Spinetta)
4. Retrato de bambis (Franzetti)
5. Asilo en tu corazón (Spinetta)
6. Dejaste ver tu corazón (Páez)
7. Sólo la la la (Páez)
8. Gricel (Mores - Contursi)
9. Serpiente de gas (Spinetta)
10. Todos estos años de gente (Spinetta)

CD 2

1. Carta para mí desde el 2086 (Páez)
2. Jabalíes conejines (Spinetta)
3. Parte del aire (Páez)
4. Cuando el arte ataque (Spinetta)
5. Pequeño ángel (Spinetta)
6. Arrecife (Spinetta)
7. Estoy atiborrado con tu amor (Spinetta)
8. Un niño nace (Spinetta)
9. Woycek (Páez)
10. Hay otra canción (Páez - Spinetta)
