= Hand in Hand (Ugandan TV series) =

Hand in Hand is a Ugandan soap opera created to promote vocational training and the field of craftsmanship in the country. The first series was launched in October 2005 and ran until December of the same year. The show was produced by Great Lakes Film Production with funding from the Ugandan Ministry of Education and Sports and the German State Development Bank (Kreditanstalt für die Wiederaufbau). Other sponsors include Coca-Cola, Uganda Telecom and the German Technical Cooperation (GTZ).

The show is performed by an ensemble cast made up of exclusively Ugandan actors. Central themes include vocational training, women's rights/sexism, alcoholism and HIV/AIDS.

The show is ground-breaking in that it addresses these issues, but also in the fact that it uses the medium of film and television to present them, when film and media are not yet a key aspect of Ugandan culture. Ellen Görlich, the show's producer and head of Great Lakes Film Production, has been working in recent years to make the medium more well known in Uganda.

== Cast and characters ==
Actor	Role	Occupation
Nancy Kalembe	Veronica	Metal Worker
Jacquelyne Kizze	Natalia	Trainee Beautician
Richard Tuwangye	Duadi	Trainee Carpenter

== See also ==
- Beneath The Lies - The Series
