= Ruki Vverh! =

Russian pop and techno band

Hands Up! Руки Вверх!
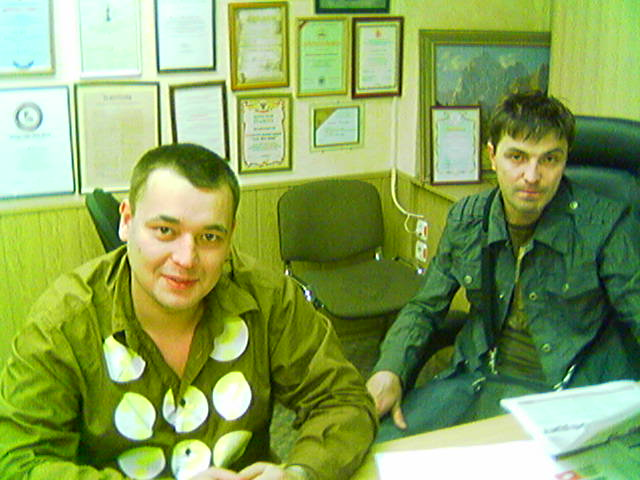
- Zhukov and Potekhin in 2005

Background information
- Origin: Russia
- Genres: Pop, Eurodance, dance-pop
- Years active: 1996–2006, 2008–present
- Members: Sergey Zhukov
- Past members: Aleksey Potekhin
- Website: RukiVverh.ru

Ruki Vverh! (Russian: Руки Вверх, meaning "Hands Up!") is the name of Russian pop and dance musician Sergey Zhukov. They were originally a duo which consisted of Zhukov and Aleksey Potekhin. The duo came to prominence in the 1990s.

== History ==
=== 1990s ===
In June 1993, future frontman of the group Sergey Zhukov began working at the radio station Europa Plus Samara, hosting a dance music program called "Hit Hour". It was there in 1993 that he met Alexey Potekhin, and together they formed the group Mr. Ray Company (also known as "Mister Ray Company" and "Uncle Ray and Company"), named after Ray Slijngaard, the vocalist of 2 Unlimited, whose music combined elements of Eurodance and techno. The original members also included Sergey Karachenkov (who was the group's first producer from 1993 to 1996) and Ivan Alekhin (producer from 1995 to 1996).

In December 1994, Zhukov and Potekhin moved to Tolyatti, where they attempted to record songs in a studio, commuting to Samara for Europa Plus broadcasts. On May 1, 1995, they relocated to Moscow. The group decided to abandon their old name but had not yet settled on a new one. Around this time, Zhukov and Potekhin invited rappers Willy Wilsino (from the group Brothers Nalichnye, which also included rapper N’Pans) and his friend Fernando to join. The group's initial working name was Hande Hoch.

At the end of 1995, the musicians submitted a cassette of several songs to the radio station Radio Maximum, labeling it: "This music will make you put your hands up!" A week later, the cassette reached the hosts Olga Maksimova and Konstantin Mikhailov. They played the song "Good Morning" on their show, introducing it as the work of a "young group, 'Hands Up!'" From that point on, the group adopted this name.

The group's first release under the new name was the 1996 single "Love Story", the only release to feature Willy Wilsino (Fernando left the project earlier that year). The single was released by Pavian Records, a label known for Moscow's underground rap artists of the 1990s. The members adopted pseudonyms for the release: "Uncle Ray" (Sergey Zhukov), "Potekha" (Alexey Potekhin), and Willy (Willy Wilsino).

By late 1996, the group started working with producers Andrey Malikov (who had previously worked with Mikhail Muromov, Technology, and Van Gogh) and Andrey Cherkasov. Additionally, dancer Anastasia Kondrykinskaya joined the group, having met Zhukov and Potekhin at the Pilot nightclub, where she worked as a dancer.

The group recorded the hit songs "Baby" and "Student", both of which became very successful. This success led to a busy touring schedule across Russia and abroad. Female vocals were provided by Yelizaveta Rodnyanskaya, who later joined the group Melissa. Popular tracks featuring her included "Student", "Move Your Body", and "Little Song".

Within months, the group completed their debut album Breathe Evenly. By spring and summer 1997, music videos for "Baby" and "Student" were released, and the group gained even more recognition. However, Yelizaveta Rodnyanskaya left the group after being told she did not fit the stage image and could not participate in tours due to school obligations.

The group performed at major events such as MAXIDANCE-2 at the Moscow Palace of Youth and NON-STOP 97 in Sokolniki Park. By late 1998, they released the highly successful album Turn It Up!, featuring tracks like "My Baby" and "Other Lips". Success continued with the 1999 album No Brakes, reportedly selling 12 million copies, though most sales were pirated.

By the end of 1999, the group ended their contract with producer Andrey Malikov and established their label, "Dancing Men" (B-Funky Productions), supporting emerging pop groups.

=== 2000s ===
In 2000, the German group ATC recorded a cover of the song "Pesenka" from the album Make It Loud! The track, titled "Around the World (La La La La La)", reached the Top 30 of the Billboard Hot 100 and the top 20 of the UK charts. According to Sergey Zhukov, the royalties from the song exceeded what the group had earned over the previous eight years of work.

In the music video for the song "On tebya tseluet" ("He Kisses You", 2002), the role of one of the main characters was played by the drag queen Anatoly Evdokimov.

In 2002, dancer Irina Tomilova, who in April 2002 became Alexey Potekhin's first wife, left the group. Ruki Vverkh! began collaborating with members of the dance collective Street Jazz, including Sergey Mandrik and Maxim Nedolechko, later joined by Alexandra Permyakova. This creative collaboration involved jointly developing programs, writing scripts, and selecting music. The presentation of the joint work by Ruki Vverkh! and Street Jazz took place in July 2002 in Podolsk and was later shown in Saint Petersburg. The program featured a new "young" lineup of the Street Jazz show ballet.

In August 2006, the group disbanded. Sergey Zhukov cited the emergence of new groups, making competition more challenging, as well as mutual fatigue and musical disagreements among the members. A final concert titled "The End of the Legend: Farewell Concert of Ruki Vverkh!" was planned at the Olympiysky Sports Complex, but the group could not secure the necessary funding of over $500,000.

Sergey Zhukov spent several years releasing solo works, including the album In Search of Tenderness and several music videos.

Starting in December 2007, Sergey Zhukov began using the name Ruki Vverkh! for his solo projects.

In addition, he produced artists such as Akula (Oksana Pochepa), Opium Project, Factor 2, the group Skazka, and the R&B project K.U.K.L.A.

In February 2008, Zhukov's first book, Starfall, co-authored with journalist and online writer Maxim Petrenchuk from Saint Petersburg, was published by AST.

In the spring of 2008, Alexey Potekhin began working on his new project, Track & Blues, which included DMC BluezZ and Vladimir Luchnikov, a former vocalist of the groups Patsany and Turbomoda. In March 2008, Potekhin released his compilation of dance music, Potekhin Style: Disco 3, featuring tracks from young bands and hits from groups like Demo, Track, Jakarta, Planka, Krassavchik, SuperboyZ, and others.

=== 2010s ===
On October 22, 2010, the group appeared in full composition for the first time in five years on the First Channel program Let Them Talk hosted by Andrey Malakhov.

In October 2012, Ruki Vverh! released the album Otkroy Mne Dver (Open the Door for Me). The album featured 14 tracks, including nine new songs and others previously performed at concerts and broadcast on the radio ("Mama", "Ya Budu s Toboy", "Devochka iz Proshlogo", "Uvidimsya v Snah", "Skazhi, Zachem?"). Three music videos were created to promote the album.

In September 2013, the group released the official single "Krylya" ("Wings") on iTunes, a collaboration with the artist Bahh Tee.

On October 30, 2014, a new song, "Molchi" ("Be Silent"), featuring former protégé of Sergey Zhukov, Timur Vagapov from Faktor-2, was released.

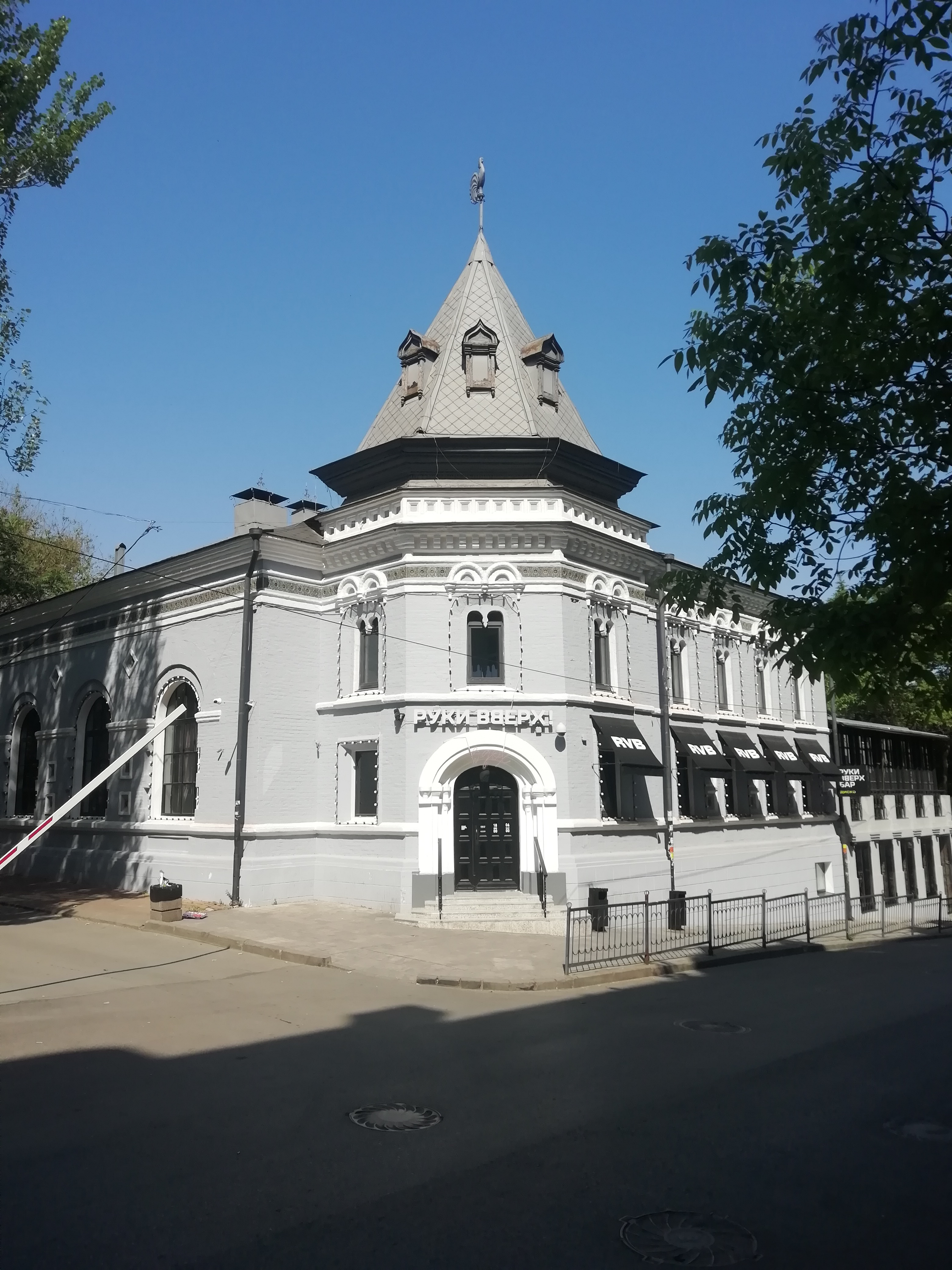
Ruki Vverh! Bar in Rostov-on-Don

Alexey Potekhin formed a new group called Podnimayem Ruki Vverh! (later renamed Potekhin Band). The group actively tours both in Russia and abroad.

=== 2020s ===
In addition to his musical career, Sergey Zhukov is actively involved in business. Numerous bars under the name Ruki Vverh! Bar have been opened across the country. Alongside his wife, he also launched a confectionery shop called Lyubov i Sladosti (Love and Sweets).

In 2021, Sergey ventured into filmmaking by launching his series Evgenich, in which he stars as the lead actor and serves as the creator and director. A second season of the series was released in 2022.

In 2023, production began on a feature film about the group, Ruki Vverh!, with the premiere taking place on October 10, 2024.

== Political stance ==
The group has supported the 2022 Russian invasion of Ukraine, as on March 18, 2022, the group performed at the rally-concert “Za Mir Bez Natsizma” ("Z for a World Without Nazism"), which was dedicated to the Annexation of Crimea by the Russian Federation.

== Discography ==
Russian name	Translation	Year	Notes
Дышите равномерно (Dyshite Ravnomerno)	Breathe Evenly	1997	
Руки вверх, Доктор Шлягер! (Ruki Vverh, Doktor Schlager!)	Hands Up, Dr. Schlager!	1998	Album with covers and remixes of songs by Vyacheslav Dobrynin
Сделай погромче! (Sdelay Pogromche)	Make It Louder!	1998	
Сделай ещё громче! (Sdelay Yescho Gromche)	Make It Even Louder!	1998	
Без тормозов (Bez Tormozov)	No Вrakes	1999	
Совсем без тормозов (Sovsem Bez Tormozov)	No Brakes at All	1999	
Crazy		1999	Unofficial album (the songs are in English)
Здравствуй, это я... (Zdravstvui, Eto Ya)	Hello, It's Me...	2000	
Не бойся, я с тобой! (Ne Boisya, Ya S Toboi)	Do Not Worry, I'm with You	2001	
Маленькие девочки (Malen'kie Devochki)	Little Girls	2001	
Огонь (Ogon')	Fire	2001	Unofficial album
Конец попсе, танцуют все! (Konets Popse, Tantsuyut Vse!)	Pop Is Dead, Everybody Dance!	2002	
Мне с тобою хорошо (Mne S Toboyu Horosho)	You Make Me Feel Good	2003	
А девочкам так холодно... (A Devochkam Tak Holodno...)	And The Girls Are So Cold	2004	
Fuc*in' Rock'n'Roll		2005	
Natasha		2005	Made for Germany
Открой мне дверь! (Otkroy Mne Dver!)	Open The Door For Me!	2012	

== Covers and sampling ==
- "Pesenka" has been covered or heavily sampled by other acts that went on to have international hits with them, including A Touch of Class's "Around the World (La La La La La)" in 2000, beFour's "Magic Melody" in 2007, Beat Ink's "Around the World" in 2008, Chris Webby's "La La La" in 2009, Auburn featuring Iyaz's "La La La" in 2010 and Ava Max's "My Head & My Heart" in 2020.
- "18 Mne Uzhe" has been covered by Estonian pop group Hellad Velled as "18", which became a hit. Also Russian pop group Reflex made another cover of the song. The song also received an English-language version (titled only "18") and accompanying music video by the Russian-German music project Code Red, in 2009.
- "Kroshka Moya" has been parodied by the Ukrainian Russophone comedy group Lyudi v Belom in a German language version titled "Meine Kleine" under the fake name Hände Hoch (Хенде Хох, meaning "Hands Up" in German).
- "Mne S Toboyu Horosho" has been covered by Haiducii in 2004.
