= Sergey Zhukov (musician) =

Russian pop musician (born 1976)

Sergey Zhukov Сергей Жуков
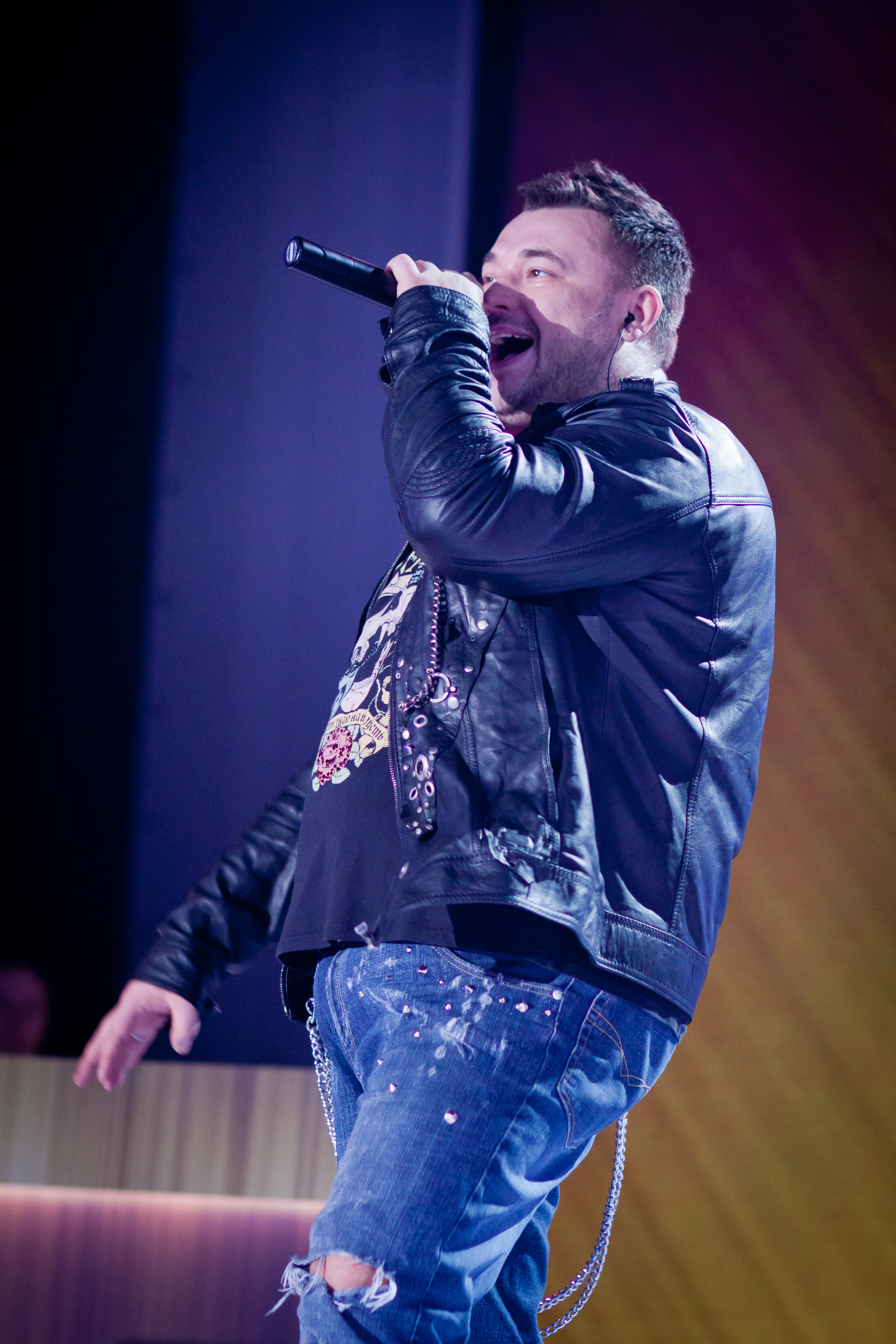
- Sergey Zhukov in 2012

Background information
- Born: Sergey Yevgenevich Zhukov; 22 May 1976 (age 50); Dimitrovgrad, Ulyanovsk Oblast, Russian SFSR, Soviet Union
- Genre: Pop
- Occupation: Singer
- Instrument: Vocals
- Member of: Ruki Vverh!

Sergey Yevgenevich Zhukov (Russian: Сергей Евгеньевич Жуков; born 22 May 1976) is a Russian singer, musician, entrepreneur, music producer, television and radio host, and DJ. He first emerged as the lead singer for the band "Ruki Vverh!" in 1996, alongside Aleksey Potekhin.

In the Forbes Russia ranking "Top Russian Celebrities," he was ranked 43rd in 2017 and rose to 16th place in 2018. In 2021, in the Forbes Russia ranking "50 Most Successful Stars of Russia," he took 21st place.

== Biography ==
Zhukov was born on 22 May 1976, in a Russian-Tatar family. At school, he was an excellent student and liked the humanities, but later became passionate about music and began playing in bands. At the age of 14, he started singing in the Dimitrovgrad band "Vasya" (Russian: Вася), named after its leader Vasily Kutlubaev. In 1991, the band "Vasya" won the song contest Province 91, and Sergey was invited for an interview on Dimitrovgrad television. In 1993, he graduated from school and moved to Samara.

In June 1993, he began working at the radio station Europa Plus Samara and hosted the dance music program Hit Hour. At the radio station that same year, he met Aleksey Potekhin, with whom he created the group Uncle Ray and Company (named after Ray Slijngaard of the group 2 Unlimited), whose music combined elements of eurodance and techno. In 1993, he entered the Samara State Institute of Arts and Culture. He lived in the institute's dormitory for half a year. In 1999, he graduated with a degree as a "director of show programs, organizer of cultural and leisure activities for youth".

In December 1994, together with Aleksey Potekhin, he moved to Tolyatti, where they tried to record songs in a studio, while continuing to travel to Samara for radio broadcasts on Europa Plus. While living in Tolyatti, Sergey Zhukov began dating his first wife, Elena Dobyndo, the daughter of the then vice-president of AvtoVAZ. Their romance did not begin immediately — after some time, Zhukov moved to Moscow, Elena also ended up in Moscow, and after another date there, they decided never to part again. Shortly after the wedding, their daughter Alexandra was born. However, their family life did not work out, quarrels increasingly arose, and four years later Elena decided to file for divorce. The divorce was very difficult for Zhukov — he fell into depression and made several attempts to reconcile with his wife, but was unable to restore the family. Soon after the divorce, Elena moved to the United States with their daughter. Sergey regained his emotional balance thanks to meeting Regina Burd, a member of the group Slivki. After a marriage proposal made by Sergey during a yacht trip, Regina agreed to marry him.

In 2023, Zhukov served as showrunner, general and music producer, as well as scriptwriter of the musical drama "Crybaby" (Russian: Плакса), produced by "Ruki Vverh!" production (commissioned by STS channel). The lead role in the series was played by his daughter Nika.

In 2024, he became a mentor and producer of the show New Star Factory on the TNT channel.

== Ruki Vverh! ==
Sergey Zhukov considers the beginning of his career to be 1 May 1995, when he arrived in Moscow. In Moscow, he worked as a DJ at the radio stations Roks and Maximum. The name "Ruki Vverh" was given on radio Maximum at the end of 1996. Producer Andrey Malikov became interested in the group, leading to concerts and tours.

== Solo career ==
In 2002, Sergey Zhukov released his first solo album, "Territory" (Russian: Территория). In 2004, the album "Territory. Tenderness" (Russian: Территория. Нежность) was released. After the breakup of "Ruki Vverh!" in 2006, Sergey recorded the album "In Search of Tenderness" (Russian: В поисках нежности). In the summer of 2012, a clip for the joint song with the band USB, "Say, Why?" (Russian: Скажи, зачем?), was released. On 16 September 2013, a music video with singer Bahh Tee "Wings" (Russian: Крылья), was also released.

=== Other ===
- On 30 October 2014, a new song was released with former wards of Sergei Zhukov, Factor 2, and Timur Vagapov — "Be Silent" (Russian: Молчи).
- In 2017, Sergey Zhukov took under his management the women's football team "Ruki Vverh!".
- In 2018, the group Little Big together with Sergey Zhukov filmed a music video for the song "The slamming boys" (Russian: Слэмятся пацаны). In the song, Sergey Zhukov performs the chorus, and in the video he plays a key role.
- Gayazovs Brothers and the group "Ruki Vverh!" released the joint track "For the Dance Floor" (Russian: Ради танцпола). The single premiered online on 19 March 2021. In it, the musicians sing that they go on stage "for the dance floor, dad, mom, and you," and call on everyone dancing with them to throw depression out of their minds.
- In November 2021, Sergey Zhukov, together with his son Angel, released a song entitled "Boom-Boom!", which became the soundtrack to the animated film "Plush Boom!" .

== Discography ==
=== Solo albums ===
- 2002: Territory (Russian: Территория)
- 2004: Territory. Tenderness (Russian: Территория. Нежность)
- 2007: In Search of Tenderness (Russian: В поисках нежности)

=== Singles ===
- 2021: For the Dance Floor (Russian: Ради танцпола) (feat. Gayazovs Brothers)

== Controversy ==
He performed at the pro-Putin and pro-war 2022 Moscow rally. He is currently banned from performing in the EU and Ukraine.
