= Aleksey Potekhin =

Russian pop musician (born 1972)

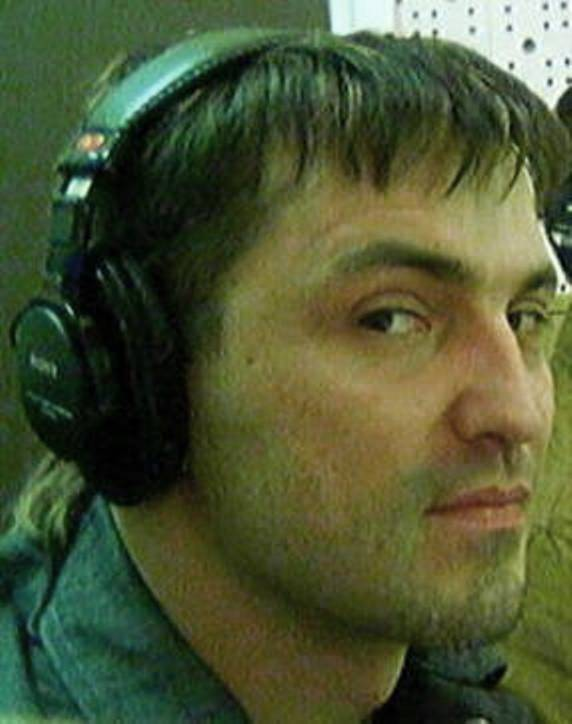

Background information
- Born: Aleksey Yevgenevich Potekhin; April 15, 1972 (age 54); Novokuybyshevsk, Samara Oblast, Russian SFSR, Soviet Union
- Occupations: Singer, producer, musician, broadcaster
- Formerly of: Hands Up!
- Website: rukivverh.su

Aleksey Yevgenevich Potekhin (Russian: Алексей Евгеньевич Потехин; born 15 April 1972) is a Russian pop musician. Alongside Sergey Zhukov, Potekhin was a member of the successful pop/techno band Hands Up! until it dissolved in 2006.

== Career ==
After the break-up of Hands Up! in 2006, Potekhin continued with a solo music career and produced acts like Superboys, and J Well (the former member of Discomafia).

Between 2006 and 2008, he released 3 collections of dance music on the website "potexinstyle.ru", that included young acts Demo, Turbomoda, and Planka Etc. Potekhin has also produced Trek/Blues led by Vladimir Luchnikov, the lead singer of Turbomoda and Svoi of Ruslan Achkinadze. Aleksey is the older brother of Andrei Potekhin, ex-member of Turbomoda and Revolvers. Andrei manages Aleksey Potekhin's new project of Trek/Blues.
