= Around the World (La La La La La) =

2000 song by German Eurodance group ATC

Single by ATC

from the album Planet Pop
- B-side: "World in Motion"
- Released: 22 May 2000
- Genre: Eurodance; hi-NRG
- Length: 3:38 (radio edit)
- Label: King Size; BMG
- Songwriters: Aleksey Potekhin; Sergey Zhukov; Alex Christensen; Peter Könemann
- Producer: Alex Christensen

ATC singles chronology
| "Around the World (La La La La La)" (2000) | "My Heart Beats Like a Drum (Dum Dum Dum)" (2000) |

Music video
- "Around the World (La La La La La)" on YouTube

"Around the World (La La La La La)" is a song by German-based international Eurodance group ATC (an abbreviation of "A Touch of Class"). The song is a cover of the Russian hit "Pesenka" by Ruki Vverh! and uses the song's melody with additional English lyrics. Both songs feature the phrase "la la la la la" in a call and response format. Released in May 2000 as ATC's debut single, the song is their most successful, reaching the top 20 in most countries where it was released, including Austria, Germany, Poland, Romania and Switzerland, where it topped the charts.

== Background and release ==
"Around the World (La La La La La)" was released as ATC's debut single from their debut album, Planet Pop, on 22 May 2000 in Germany. It was produced and recorded by German producer Alex Christensen with its melody almost entirely based on "Pesenka" by Ruki Vverh!. The single reached number one on the German Singles Chart for six weeks in 2000. It also reached number one in Austria, Poland, Romania, and Switzerland and the top 10 in Belgium, Canada, Denmark, Finland, Hungary, the Netherlands, and Sweden.

On 6 November 2000, the song was released in the United Kingdom but did not chart. In August 2002, it was re-released in a newly remixed version, peaking at number 15 on the UK Singles Chart. In the United States, "Around the World (La La La La La)" was serviced to radio stations on 16 January 2001 and peaked at number 28 on the Billboard Hot 100 chart.

== Music video ==
The music video for "Around the World" was filmed in 1999, and part of it was filmed in a pedestrian tunnel near Internationales Congress Centrum Berlin in Berlin.

A yellow Melkus RS 1000 with a blue license plate containing the text "ATC" features in the video. It appears both as a miniature slot car and as an original. It is seen drifting and dashing through the tunnel. During the final chorus, Sarah Egglestone and Tracey Elizabeth Packham are lying on the hood while it is driving. In between shots of the car moving, the group members can be seen dancing in a bluish-grey room on a small stage surrounded by water resembling a swimming pool and playing with the cars in the same room.

== Track listings ==
- European CD single 1
1. "Around the World (La La La La La)" (radio version) – 3:35
2. "Around the World (La La La La La)" (acoustic mix) – 3:20
- European CD single 2
1. "Around the World (La La La La La)" (radio version) – 3:35
2. "Around the World (La La La La La)" (club mix) – 5:37
- European maxi-CD and Australian CD single
1. "Around the World (La La La La La)" (radio version) – 3:35
2. "Around the World (La La La La La)" (alternative radio version) – 3:31
3. "Around the World (La La La La La)" (acoustic mix) – 3:20
4. "Around the World (La La La La La)" (Rüegsegger#Wittwer club mix) – 5:37
5. "World in Motion" – 3:31
- European maxi-CD single (Remixes)
1. "Around the World (La La La La La)" (Rüegsegger#Wittwer club mix—short) – 3:44
2. "Around the World (La La La La La)" (RNT mix) – 3:08
3. "Around the World (La La La La La)" (extended club mix) – 4:58
4. "Around the World (La La La La La)" (Triage club mix) – 5:10
- US 12-inch single

A1. "Around the World (La La La La La)" (album version) – 3:35
A2. "Around the World (La La La La La)" (Rüegsegger#Wittwer club mix) – 5:37
A3. "Around the World (La La La La La)" (RNT mix) – 3:08
B1. "Around the World (La La La La La)" (extended club mix) – 4:58
B2. "Around the World (La La La La La)" (Triage club mix) – 5:10
B3. "Around the World (La La La La La)" (acoustic mix) – 3:20

- UK CD single (2002)
1. "Around the World (La La La La La)" (2002 single mix) – 3:37
2. "Around the World (La La La La La)" (acoustic mix) – 3:21
3. "Around the World (La La La La La)" (Almighty mix) – 7:13
4. "Around the World (La La La La La)" (2002 extended mix) – 4:41
5. "Around the World (La La La La La)" (video)
- UK cassette single (2002)
1. "Around the World (La La La La La)" (2002 single mix) – 3:37
2. "Around the World (La La La La La)" (acoustic mix) – 3:21
3. "Around the World (La La La La La)" (Almighty mix) – 7:13
4. "Around the World (La La La La La)" (2002 extended mix) – 4:41

== Charts ==
=== Weekly charts ===
2000–2000 weekly chart performance for "Around the World (La La La La La)"
| Chart (2000–2002) | Peak position |
|---|---|
| Australia (ARIA) | 11 |
| Australian Dance (ARIA) | 2 |
| Austria (Ö3 Austria Top 40) | 1 |
| Belgium (Ultratop 50 Flanders) | 10 |
| Belgium (Ultratop 50 Wallonia) | 10 |
| Canada (Nielsen SoundScan) | 10 |
| Canada CHR (Nielsen BDS) | 7 |
| Canada Dance/Urban (RPM) | 38 (Note: "Around the World" reached number 38 when RPM ceased publication in November 2000.) |
| Croatia International (HRT) | 3 |
| Czech Republic (IFPI) | 15 |
| Denmark (IFPI) | 2 |
| Europe (Eurochart Hot 100) | 5 |
| Finland (Suomen virallinen lista) | 7 |
| France (SNEP) | 12 |
| Germany (GfK) | 1 |
| Hungary (Mahasz) | 2 |
| Ireland (IRMA) | 24 |
| Ireland Dance (IRMA) | 3 |
| Italy (FIMI) | 16 |
| Netherlands (Dutch Top 40) | 4 |
| Netherlands (Single Top 100) | 5 |
| Poland Airplay (Music & Media) | 3 |
| Poland (PiF PaF) | 1 |
| Quebec (ADISQ) | 33 |
| Romania (Romanian Top 100) | 1 |
| Scottish Singles Sales (Official Charts) | 11 |
| Sweden (Sverigetopplistan) | 8 |
| Switzerland (Schweizer Hitparade) | 1 |
| UK Singles (Official Charts) | 15 |
| US Billboard Hot 100 | 28 |
| US Mainstream Top 40 (Billboard) | 12 |
| US Maxi-Singles Sales (Billboard) | 34 |
| US Rhythmic Top 40 (Billboard) | 24 |
| US Top 40 Tracks (Billboard) | 12 |

2026 weekly chart performance for "Around the World (La La La La La)"
| Chart (2026) | Peak position |
|---|---|
| Finland Airplay (Radiosoittolista) | 61 |

=== Year-end charts ===
2000 year-end chart performance for "Around the World (La La La La La)"
| Chart (2000) | Position |
|---|---|
| Austria (Ö3 Austria Top 40) | 6 |
| Belgium (Ultratop 50 Flanders) | 63 |
| Belgium (Ultratop 50 Wallonia) | 73 |
| Denmark (IFPI) | 21 |
| Europe (Eurochart Hot 100) | 26 |
| France (SNEP) | 35 |
| Germany (Media Control) | 3 |
| Romania (Romanian Top 100) | 29 |
| Sweden (Hitlistan) | 70 |
| Switzerland (Schweizer Hitparade) | 16 |

2001 year-end chart performance for "Around the World (La La La La La)"
| Chart (2001) | Position |
|---|---|
| Australia (ARIA) | 66 |
| Australian Dance (ARIA) | 4 |
| Canada (Nielsen SoundScan) | 57 |
| Netherlands (Dutch Top 40) | 45 |
| Netherlands (Single Top 100) | 65 |
| US Mainstream Top 40 (Billboard) | 63 |
| US Rhythmic Top 40 (Billboard) | 90 |

=== Decade-end charts ===
Decade-end chart performance for "Around the World (La La La La La)"
| Chart (2000–2009) | Position |
|---|---|
| Austria (Ö3 Austria Top 40) | 24 |
| Germany (Media Control GfK) | 62 |

== Certifications ==
Certifications for "Around the World (La La La La La)"
| Region | Certification | Certified units/sales |
|---|---|---|
| Austria (IFPI Austria) | Gold | 25,000^{*} |
| Belgium (BRMA) | Gold | 25,000^{*} |
| Denmark (IFPI Danmark) | Gold | 45,000^{‡} |
| France (SNEP) | Silver | 125,000^{*} |
| Germany (BVMI) | Platinum | 500,000^{^} |
| Sweden (GLF) | Gold | 15,000^{^} |
| Switzerland (IFPI Switzerland) | Gold | 25,000^{^} |
| United Kingdom (BPI) | Silver | 200,000^{‡} |
^{*} Sales figures based on certification alone.^{^} Shipments figures based on certification alone.^{‡} Sales+streaming figures based on certification alone.

== Release history ==
Release dates and formats for "Around the World (La La La La La)"
| Region | Date | Format(s) | Label(s) | Ref. |
|---|---|---|---|---|
| Germany | 22 May 2000 | CD | King Size; BMG | |
| Finland | 10 July 2000 | CD | King Size; BMG | |
| Sweden | 10 July 2000 | CD | King Size; BMG | |
| Australia | 3 October 2000 | CD | King Size; BMG | |
| United Kingdom | 6 November 2000 | CD; cassette | RCA; BMG | |
| United States | 16 January 2001 | Contemporary hit; rhythmic contemporary; hot adult contemporary radio | Universal | |
| United Kingdom (re-release) | 5 August 2002 | CD; cassette | Liberty EMI; BMG | |

== R3hab version ==
"All Around the World (La La La)"

Single by R3hab and A Touch of Class
- Released: 5 April 2019
- Genre: Future house
- Length: 2:27 (radio edit); 3:31 (extended edit)
- Label: Cyb3rpvnk; Casablanca
- Songwriters: Aleksey Potekhin; Sergey Zhukov; Alex Christensen; Peter Könemann
- Producer: R3hab

R3hab singles chronology
| "This Is How We Party" (2019) | "All Around the World (La La La)" (2019) | "Don't Give Up on Me" (2019) |

A Touch of Class singles chronology
| "New York City" (2003) | "All Around the World (La La La)" (2019) |

Music video
- "All Around the World" on YouTube

In 2019, Dutch DJ R3hab released a cover version titled "All Around the World (La La La)". The band was credited on the release as A Touch of Class, though it features new vocals by an uncredited guest vocalist.

=== Charts ===
==== Weekly charts ====
Weekly chart performance for "All Around the World (La La La)"
| Chart (2019–2020) | Peak position |
|---|---|
| Austria (Ö3 Austria Top 40) | 35 |
| Belgium (Ultratop 50 Flanders) | 11 |
| Belgium (Ultratip Bubbling Under Wallonia) | 5 |
| CIS Airplay (TopHit) | 164 |
| Czech Republic Airplay (ČNS IFPI) | 30 |
| Czech Republic Singles Digital (ČNS IFPI) | 53 |
| Denmark (Tracklisten) | 26 |
| Finland (Suomen virallinen lista) | 10 |
| France (SNEP) | 63 |
| Germany (GfK) | 29 |
| Greece International Digital (IFPI Greece) | 59 |
| Hungary (Dance Top 40) | 38 |
| Hungary (Rádiós Top 40) | 6 |
| Hungary (Single Top 40) | 37 |
| Hungary (Stream Top 40) | 27 |
| Ireland (IRMA) | 92 |
| Lithuania (AGATA) | 28 |
| Netherlands (Dutch Top 40) | 6 |
| Netherlands (Single Top 100) | 18 |
| Norway (VG-lista) | 31 |
| Poland Airplay (ZPAV) | 74 |
| Romania (Airplay 100) | 20 |
| Russia Airplay (TopHit) | 148 |
| Slovakia Singles Digital (ČNS IFPI) | 43 |
| Slovenia (SloTop50) | 35 |
| Sweden (Sverigetopplistan) | 47 |
| Switzerland (Schweizer Hitparade) | 39 |
| US Hot Dance/Electronic Songs (Billboard) | 20 |

2025 weekly chart performance for "All Around the World (La La La)"
| Chart (2025) | Peak position |
|---|---|
| Lithuania Airplay (TopHit) | 65 |

==== Monthly charts ====
2025 monthly chart performance for "All Around the World (La La La)"
| Chart (2025) | Peak position |
|---|---|
| Lithuania Airplay (TopHit) | 90 |

==== Year-end charts ====
2019 year-end chart performance for "All Around the World (La La La)"
| Chart (2019) | Position |
|---|---|
| Belgium (Ultratop 50 Flanders) | 48 |
| Denmark (Tracklisten) | 78 |
| Germany (GfK) | 67 |
| Netherlands (Dutch Top 40) | 44 |
| Netherlands (Single Top 100) | 49 |
| Romania (Airplay 100) | 93 |
| Switzerland (Schweizer Hitparade) | 98 |
| US Hot Dance/Electronic Songs (Billboard) | 59 |

2020 year-end chart performance for "All Around the World (La La La)"
| Chart (2020) | Position |
|---|---|
| Hungary (Rádiós Top 40) | 25 |

2024 year-end chart performance for "All Around the World (La La La)"
| Chart (2024) | Position |
|---|---|
| Lithuania Airplay (TopHit) | 81 |

2025 year-end chart performance for "All Around the World (La La La)"
| Chart (2025) | Position |
|---|---|
| Lithuania Airplay (TopHit) | 94 |

=== Certifications ===
Certifications for "All Around the World (La La La)"
| Region | Certification | Certified units/sales |
|---|---|---|
| Austria (IFPI Austria) | 2× Platinum | 60,000^{‡} |
| Belgium (BRMA) | Gold | 20,000^{‡} |
| Brazil (Pro-Música Brasil) | 3× Platinum | 120,000^{‡} |
| Canada (Music Canada) | 2× Platinum | 160,000^{‡} |
| Denmark (IFPI Danmark) | 2× Platinum | 180,000^{‡} |
| France (SNEP) | Diamond | 333,333^{‡} |
| Germany (BVMI) | Platinum | 400,000^{‡} |
| Italy (FIMI) | Platinum | 70,000^{‡} |
| Mexico (AMPROFON) | Platinum | 60,000^{‡} |
| Netherlands (NVPI) | Platinum | 80,000^{‡} |
| New Zealand (RMNZ) | Platinum | 30,000^{‡} |
| Poland (ZPAV) | 2× Platinum | 100,000^{‡} |
| Portugal (AFP) | Gold | 5,000^{‡} |
| Spain (Promusicae) | Platinum | 60,000^{‡} |
| Switzerland (IFPI Switzerland) | Platinum | 20,000^{‡} |
| United Kingdom (BPI) | Gold | 400,000^{‡} |
| United States (RIAA) | Gold | 500,000^{‡} |
Streaming
| Sweden (GLF) | 2× Platinum | 16,000,000^{†} |
^{‡} Sales+streaming figures based on certification alone.^{†} Streaming-only figures based on certification alone.

== See also ==
- "Pesenka"
- List of Romanian Top 100 number ones of the 2000s
