= Christian Geller =

German record producer

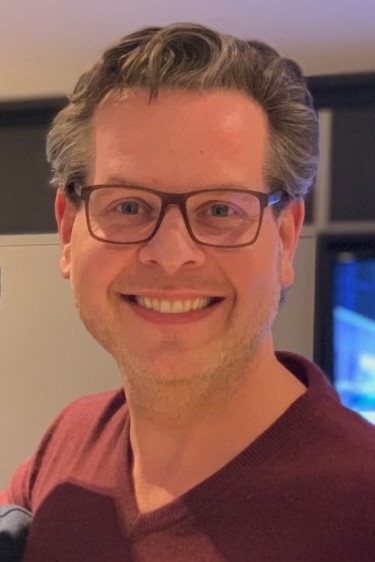
- Geller in his recording studio in 2019

Background information
- Also known as: Nick Raider
- Born: 10 March 1975 (age 51)
- Genres: Pop; Europop; Schlager
- Occupations: Record producer; composer; arranger

Christian Geller (born 10 March 1975) is a German record producer, composer, arranger, and music manager, also known under his alias Nick Raider. More than 80 songs that he co-wrote or produced, ranging from artists such as David Hasselhoff, Hape Kerkeling, Yvonne Catterfeld, Truck Stop, Claudia Jung to No Angels, Caught in the Act, Banaroo and beFour, have entered the German Singles Chart.

== Career ==
A huge fan of German duo Modern Talking, Geller began working with Modern Talking member Thomas Anders in the mid-1990s. In 1999, Geller and Anders founded a GmbH with a recording studio in Koblenz where Geller started making music professionally. Through Anders he linked with other artists for which he wrote and produced. Following a stint in Berlin, he returned to the Rhineland where he set up The Hafen Studios in Andernach along with his partners Fabian Zimmermann und Christof Neugebauer.

== Selected production discography ==
Year	Title	Artist	Credited as	
Year	Title	Artist	Writer	Producer
2000	"Großer Bruder"	Zlatko & Jürgen	Yes	No
2001	"Cry for You"	No Angels	Yes	No
2001	"Hey Mr. President"	T-Seven	Yes	Yes
2002	"Funky Dance"	No Angels	Yes	No
2002	"Stay"	No Angels	Yes	No
2002	"Mr. Nobody"	Tears	Yes	No
2006	"Stop for a Minute (2006 Version)"	Sandra	No	Yes
2006	"Uh Mamma"	Banaroo	No	Yes
2007	"All 4 One"	beFour	Yes	Yes
2007	"Hand in Hand"	beFour	Yes	Yes
2007	"How Do You Do?"	beFour	Yes	Yes
2007	"Little, Little Love"	beFour	Yes	Yes
2008	"Live Your Dream"	beFour	Yes	Yes
2013	"Hol' mich raus!"	Joey Heindle	Yes	Yes
2016	"Love Is in the Air"	Thomas Anders	No	Yes
2016	Back for Love	Caught in the Act	No	Yes
2017	"Regenbogen"	Eloy de Jong	Yes	Yes
2018	Ewig mit dir	Thomas Anders	Yes	Yes
2019	La vita è bella	Giovanni Zarrella	Yes	Yes
2021	20	No Angels	No	Yes
2025	It's Christmas	No Angels	No	Yes
