= Thomas Anders discography =

This is the discography for German musician Thomas Anders.

== Albums ==
=== Studio albums ===
Title	Album details	Peak chart positions
Title	Album details	GER
Different	Released: 29 August 1989; Label: Eastwest Germany (Warner Germany); Formats: CD, cassette, LP	—
Whispers	Released: 17 May 1991; Label: Eastwest Germany (Warner Germany); Formats: CD, cassette, LP	—
Down on Sunset	Released: 1 September 1992; Label: Polydor Germany (Universal Germany); Formats: CD, cassette, LP	—
When Will I See You Again	Released: 20 September 1993; Label: Polydor Germany (Universal Germany); Formats: CD, cassette, LP	—
Barcos de Cristal	Released: 19 April 1994; Label: PolyGram; Formats: CD, cassette, LP	—
Souled	Released: 7 April 1995; Label: Polydor Germany (Universal Germany); Formats: CD, cassette, LP	—
This Time	Released: 23 February 2004; Label: Na Klar (Sony Music Germany); Formats: CD, cassette	14
Songs Forever	Released: 3 March 2006; Label: Edel; Formats: CD	43
Strong	Released: April 2010; Label: CD Land; Formats: CD	—
History	Released: 27 May 2016; Label: White Shell Music (H'ART); Formats: CD, digital download, LP	42
Pures Leben	Released: 7 April 2017; Label: Warner Music (Germany); Formats: CD, LP	14
Ewig mit dir	Released: 19 October 2018; Label: Warner Music (Germany); Formats: CD	12
Cosmic	Released: 25 March 2021; Label: Warner Music (Germany); Formats: CD	—
...Sings Modern Talking: The 1st Album	Released: 7 March 2025; Label: Stars by Edel; Formats: triple CD, double LP	5
...Sings Modern Talking: Let's Talk About Love	Released: 2 May 2025; Label: Stars by Edel; Formats: triple CD, double LP	5
...Sings Modern Talking: Ready For Romance	Released: 20 June 2025; Label: Stars by Edel; Formats: triple CD, double LP	4
...Sings Modern Talking: In the Middle of Nowhere	Released: 8 August 2025; Label: Stars by Edel; Formats: triple CD, double LP	5
...Sings Modern Talking: Romantic Warriors	Released: 17 October 2025; Label: Stars by Edel; Formats: triple CD, double LP	8
...Sings Modern Talking: In the Garden of Venus	Released: 14 November 2025; Label: Stars by Edel; Formats: triple CD, double LP	8
"—" denotes a recording that did not chart or was not released in that territory.

=== Compilation albums ===
Title	Album details
For Your Love	Released: 1992; Label: Convoy; Formats: CD, cassette, LP
Golden Stars	Released: 1998; Label: Polydor Germany (Universal Germany); Formats: CD, cassette, LP

=== Holiday albums ===
Title	Album details	Peak chart positions
Title	Album details	GER
Christmas for You	Released: 16 November 2012; Label: Electrola (EMI); Formats: CD, digital download	99

=== Live albums ===
Title	Album details
Live Concert Thomas Anders & Jazzband	Released: 1997; Label: Panteon; Formats: CD, cassette, LP

=== Video albums ===
Title	Album details
The DVD Collection	Released: 28 April 2006; Label: Edel; Formats: DVD

=== Collaboration albums ===
Title	Album details	Peak chart positions			Certifications
Title	Album details	GER	AUT	SWI	Certifications
Two Thomas Anders | Uwe Fahrenkrog	Released: 10 June 2011; Label: Polydor Germany (Universal Germany); Formats: CD, digital download	11	71	85	
Das Album Thomas Anders | Florian Silbereisen	Released: 5 June 2020; Label: Telamo (Warner Music Germany); Formats: CD, digital download	1	1	1	BVMI: Gold; IFPI AUT: Gold
Nochmal! Thomas Anders | Florian Silbereisen	Released: 27 December 2024; Label: Telamo (Warner Music Germany); Formats: CD, digital download	1	—	3	

== Singles ==
=== As lead artist ===
Title	Year	Peak chart positions	Album
Title	Year	GER	Album
"Judy"	1980	—	Non-album singles
"Du weinst um ihn"	1980	—	Non-album singles
"Es war die Nacht der ersten Liebe"	1981	—	Non-album singles
"Ich will nicht dein Leben"	1982	—	Non-album singles
"Was macht das schon"	1983	—	Non-album singles
"Wovon träumst du denn"	1983	—	Non-album singles
"Heißkalter Engel"	1983	—	Non-album singles
"Endstation Sehnsucht"	1984	—	Non-album singles
"Es geht mir gut heut' Nacht"	1984	—	Non-album singles
"Love of My Own"	1989	24	Different
"One Thing"	1989	—	Different
"Soldier"	1989	—	Different
"The Sweet Hello, the Sad Goodbye"	1991	—	Whispers
"Can't Give You Anything (But My Love)"	1991	73	Whispers
"True Love"	1991	—	Whispers
"How Deep Is Your Love"	1992	71	Down on Sunset
"Standing Alone" (featuring Glenn Medeiros)	1992	72	Down on Sunset
"When Will I See You Again" (featuring the Three Degrees)	1993	37	When Will I See You Again
"I'll Love You Forever"	1993	79	When Will I See You Again
"The Love in Me"	1994	—	When Will I See You Again
"Road to Higher Love"	1994	—	Souled
"Never Knew Love Like This Before"	1995	—	Souled
"A Little Bit of Lovin'"	1995	—	Souled
"Independent Girl"	2003	17	This Time
"King of Love"	2004	37	This Time
"Tonight Is the Night"	2004	60	This Time
"Just Dream!"	2004	64	Holiday on Ice Dream Tour 2004/2005
"A Very Special Feeling"	2006	—	Non-album single
"Songs That Live Forever"	2006	—	Songs Forever
"All Around the World"	2006	—	Songs Forever
"Kisses for Christmas"	2008	—	Christmas for You
"Why Do You Cry"	2010	—	Strong
"Stay with Me"	2010	—	Strong
"The Christmas Song"	2010	—	Christmas for You
"Everybody Wants to Rule the World"	2014	—	Non-album single
"Take a Chance"	2015	—	History
"Lunatic"	2016	—	History
"Love Is in the Air"	2016	—	Non-album single
"Der beste Tag meines Lebens"	2017	—	Pures Leben
"Do They Know It's Christmas"	2017	—	Non-album single
"Sie sagte doch sie liebt mich" (featuring Florian Silbereisen)	2018	70	Ewig mit dir
"—" denotes a recording that did not chart or was not released in that territory.

=== As featured artist ===
Title	Year	Peak chart positions	Album
Title	Year	GER	Album
"Ibiza Baba Baya" Sound-Chateau (featuring Thomas Anders)	2008	—	Non-album singles
"For You" Sound-Chateau (featuring Thomas Anders)	2008	—	Non-album singles
"The Night Is Still Young" Sandra (featuring Thomas Anders)	2009	46	Back to Life
"We Are One" Omid (featuring Thomas Anders)	2013	—	Non-album single
"—" denotes a recording that did not chart or was not released in that territory.

=== Collaboration singles ===
Title	Year	Peak chart positions	Album
Title	Year	GER	Album
"Ziele" Sistanova and Thomas Anders	2008	—	HelleWecks Soundtrack
"Gigolo" Anders | Fahrenkrog	2011	40	Two
"No More Tears on the Dancefloor" Anders | Fahrenkrog	2011	—	Two
"—" denotes a recording that did not chart or was not released in that territory.

== Collaboration compositions ==
- 1988 "I Can Never Let You Go" (co-written for Engelbert Humperdinck)
- 1989 "Soldier" (written and produced by Alan Tarney)
- 1991 "The Sweet Hello, the Sad Goodbye" (written by Per Gessle)
- 1992 "Standing Alone" (duet with Glenn Medeiros)
- 1993 "When Will I See You Again" (duet with The Three Degrees)
- 1993 "Emotional Thing" (co-written for The Three Degrees)
- 1993 "Question of Love" (co-written for The Three Degrees)
- 1993 "Ain't No Woman" (co-written for The Three Degrees)
- 1994 "Tal Vez" (co-written for Marta Sánchez) (#1 Mexico)
- 1995 "Feel for the Physical" (duet with The Pointer Sisters)
- 2001 "Hey Mr. President" (produced by T-Seven)
- 2001 "Cry for You" (co-written for No Angels)
- 2002 "Stay" (co-written for No Angels)
- 2002 "Funky Dance" (co-written for No Angels)
