= Lo Mejor de Marta Sánchez =

Greatest hits album by Marta Sánchez
- Released: 1 March 2005
- Genre: Latin pop
- Label: Muxxic, Universal

Marta Sánchez chronology
Soy Yo (2002)	Lo Mejor de Marta Sánchez (2005)	Directo Gira 2005 La Coruña (2006)

Lo Mejor de Marta Sánchez (eng.: The Best of Marta Sanchez) is the second compilation album released by the Spanish singer Marta Sánchez. This was released on 1 March 2005. The album included three new tracks: "Sepárate", "Caradura" and "Profundo Valor", which were promoted as singles. Also included on this album was a reworked version of her hit-single "Soldados del Amor" previously recorded with her group Olé Olé.

== Track listing ==
1. Sepárate (Eva Manzano/Marta Sánchez/Carlos Jean) — 3:08
2. Profundo Valor (Claudio Silvestri/Piero Cassano/Marta Sanchez) — 3:35
3. Caradura (Eva Manzano/Marta Sanchez/Carlos Jean) — 3:08
4. Despesperada 2004 — 3:39 (Original version on the album Mujer)
5. Soldados del Amor 2004 — 4:52
6. Soy Yo (From the album Soy Yo — 4:00
7. Sigo Intentando (From the album Soy Yo) — 3:57
8. No Te Quiero Más (From the album Soy Yo) — 4:13
9. Desconocida (From the album Desconocida) — 4:38
10. Quiero Más de Ti (From the album Desconocida) — 3:26
11. Y Sin Embargo Te Quiero (From the compilation album Tatuaje) — 4:31
12. Moja mi corazón (From the album Azabache) — 4:56
13. Amor Perdido (From the album Azabache) — 4:11
14. La Belleza (From the album Mi Mundo) — 3:32
15. Arena y Sol (From the album Mi Mundo) — 3:16
16. Dime la Verdad (From the album Mi Mundo) — 4:09
17. De Mujer a Mujer (From the album Mujer) — 4:31
