= Mujer (album) =

Studio album by Marta Sánchez
- Released: November 18, 1993
- Genre: Latin pop
- Label: Mercury, Polygram
- Producer: Christian De Walden, Ralf Stemmann

Marta Sánchez chronology
Mujer (1993)	Mi Mundo (1995)

Mujer (Spanish: "Woman") is the title of the first album by Spanish singer Marta Sánchez. Released in 1993, it was produced by Christian De Walden and Ralf Stemmann.

== History and success ==
The album's first single "Desesperada" was an instant success in Mexico and Spain, reaching #1 in both countries and #9 on the Billboard Hot Latin Tracks. For this single, the artist won "Best Dance Song" at the 1994 Eres Awards in México. The second single "De Mujer a Mujer" was another hit. "Tal Vez" (co-written by Thomas Anders of Modern Talking fame) and "Nube de Verano" were released as third and fourth singles, respectively, in Latin America. However, in Europe, "Amén" and "Lejos de Aquella Noche" were successful singles also.

Mujer peaked at #49 on the Top Latin Albums chart. The album sold one million copies internationally and remains the biggest seller for the artist.The Mexican magazine Eres featured it in their Annual Review of the Best Albums of 1994.

Woman, the English version of the album, includes the same tracks but in a different order, and it also has a bonus track: a new version of "Desesperada" entitled "Desperate Lovers" featuring Paulo Ricardo.

== Track listing for Mujer ==
1. "Desesperada" (Steve Singer/Austin Roberts/Carlos Toro) — 3:45
2. "Amén" (Ralf Stemmann/Christian De Walden/Margaret Harris/Carlos Toro) — 3:47
3. "De Mujer A Mujer" (Carlos Toro) — 4:48
4. "Yo No Sé" (Ralf Stemmann/Andrew Klippel/Todd Cerney/Carlos Toro) — 4:08
5. "Eso Es El Soul" (Sara Summers-Pickett/Carlos Toro) — 4:20
6. "Nube De Verano" (Christian De Walden/Ralf Stemmann/Mark Anderson/Carlos Toro) — 3:43
7. "Olvídate De Mí" (Max Di Carlo/Carlos Toro/Margaret Harris) — 3:46
8. "Lejos de Aquella Noche" (Steve Singer/Warren Ham/Adap.: Fernando Allende) — 3:20
9. "Tal Vez" (Christian De Walden/Ralf Stemmann/Mike Shepston/Chris Copperfield/Carlos Toro) — 3:47
10. "El Último Rock" (Carlos Toro/Ralf Stemmann/Andrew Klippel/Todd Cerney) — 3:17
11. "Cuidado" (Andrew Klippel/Todd Cerney/Carlos Toro) — 4:15
12. "Desesperada (English Extended Version)" (Steve Singer/Austin Roberts) — 5:20

== Track listing for Woman ==
1. "Desesperada" (Steve Singer/Austin Roberts) — 3:42
2. "Amen" (Ralf Stemmann/Christian De Walden/Margaret Harris/Carlos Toro) — 3:47
3. "Where The Love Never Ends [De Mujer a Mujer]" (Carlos Toro/English lyrics: Margaret Harris) — 4:48
4. "That's Alright With Me [Yo No Sé]" (Ralf Stemmann/Andrew Klippel/Todd Cerney) — 4:26
5. "So Close To You [Tal Vez]" (Carlos Toro/Chris Copperfield/Christian de Walden/Ralf Stemmann/Mike Shepstone) — 3:53
6. "Out Of The Night [Lejos de Aquella Noche]" (Steve Singer/Warren Ham) — 3:27
7. "Lover In A Million [Nube de Verano]" (Christian De Walden/Ralf Stemmann/Mark Anderson/Carlos Toro; additional English lyrics: Margaret Harris) — 3:43
8. "Once [Eso Es El Soul]" (Sara Summers/Pickett) — 3:20
9. "Dignity [Olvídate de Mí]" (Max Di Carlo/Carlos Toro/Margaret Harris) — 3:50
10. "Whatever It Takes [El Último Rock]" (Carlos Toro/Ralf Stemmann/Andrew Klippel/Todd Cerney) — 3:27
11. "Be Careful Of Your Dreams [Cuidado]" (Andrew Klippel/Todd Cerney) — 4:17
12. "Desesperada (Extended Mix)" (Steve Singer/Austin Roberts) — 5:22
13. "Desperate Lovers" (duet with Paulo Ricardo) (Steve Singer/Austin Roberts) — 3:50

== Personnel ==
- Produced and arranged by: Christian De Walden and Ralf Stemmann
- Co-Produced by and engineered by: Walter Clissen
- Recorded at Flamingo Café Recording Studio, Studio City, California
- Mixed at Enterprise Studios, North Hollywood, California
- Engineered and mixed by: Walter Clisson, John Schmidt and Fred Kelly
- Digitally mastered by: Brian Gardner and Chris Bellman at Bernie Grundman Mastering, Hollywood, California
- Photography: Juan Martin

== Musicians ==
- Synclavier programming: Ralf Stemmann
- Keyboards: Ralf Stemmann and Randy Kerber
- Acoustic piano: Randy Kerber, Larry Steelman
- Guitars: James Harrah, Tim Pierce, Ramon Stagnaro
- Bass: Bob Parr
- Horns: “The Heart Attack” Bill Bergman, Nick Lane, Dennis Farias, Greg Smith and Les Lovett
- Saxophone and flute solos: Doug Norwine
- Percussion: Paulinho Da Costa
- Background vocals arrangements: Christian De Walden
- Background vocals: Kenny O’Brien, Bambi Jones, Brandy Jones, Michael Mishaw, Eric Paletti, Allen Savory, Warren Ham, Kirstina Nichols and Isela Sotelo

== Sales and certifications ==
Region	Certification	Certified units/sales
Mexico	—	200,000
Spain (PROMUSICAE)	Gold	50,000^{^}
^{^} Shipments figures based on certification alone.

== See also ==
- Thomas Anders - Barcos De Cristal (1994)
