= Das Album =

Studio album by Thomas Anders & Florian Silbereisen
- Released: 5 June 2020
- Length: 60:55
- Label: Telamo
- Producer: Christian Geller

Thomas Anders chronology
| Ewig mit dir (2018) | Das Album (2020) | Cosmic (2021) |

Das Album ('The Album') is a collaborative studio album by German singers Thomas Anders and Florian Silbereisen. It was released by Telamo Musik on 5 June 2020 in German-speaking Europe. Produced by Anders' longtime contributor Christian Geller, the album peaked at number-one in Austria, Germany, and Switzerland.

== Track listing ==
All tracks produced by Christian Geller.

| No. | Title | Writer(s) | Length |
|---|---|---|---|
| 1. | "Sie sagte doch sie liebt mich" | Geller; Christoph Assmann; Tobias Reitz | 3:46 |
| 2. | "Sie hat es wieder getan" | Geller; Assmann | 3:39 |
| 3. | "Sie ist wieder da" | Geller; Assmann | 3:39 |
| 4. | "Versuch's nochmal mit mir" | Reitz; Figge Boström | 4:05 |
| 5. | "Rücksicht" | Michael Reinecke; Volker Lechtenbrink | 3:20 |
| 6. | "Deine oder meine" | Werner Petersburg; Alexander Scholz; Tim Peters | 3:06 |
| 7. | "Meine beste Melodie" | Geller; Thomas Rosenfeld; Scholz | 3:48 |
| 8. | "Risiko" | Geller; Assmann | 3:35 |
| 9. | "Freunde wie wir" | Peters; Paul Falk; Katharina Schwarz | 3:58 |
| 10. | "Geliebt, gelacht, geweint" | Geller; Assmann | 3:18 |
| 11. | "Du kannst ein Sieger sein" | Geller; Assmann | 3:45 |
| 12. | "Wie ein großes Feuerwerk" | Geller; Assmann | 3:29 |
| 13. | "Stärker als die Zeit" | Geller; Assmann | 3:35 |
| 14. | "100.000 Wunder" | Geller; Assmann | 3:43 |
| 15. | "Ein kleiner Moment" | Geller; Assmann | 3:35 |
| 16. | "Wenn der Himmel uns umarmt" | Geller; Assmann | 3:56 |
| 17. | "Weiter als der Horizont" | Geller; Assmann | 3:19 |

Winter edition – bonus disc
| No. | Title | Writer(s) | Length |
|---|---|---|---|
| 1. | "Die schönste Zeit des Jahres" | Geller; Assmann | 3:58 |
| 2. | "Manchmal werden Träume wahr" | Geller; Assmann | 3:22 |
| 3. | "Winterwunderwelt" | Geller; Assmann | 3:19 |
| 4. | "Das schönste Geschenk" | Geller; Assmann; Reitz | 3:57 |
| 5. | "Sommer im Dezember" | Geller; Assmann | 3:09 |
| 6. | "Und brennen 100.000 Kerzen" | Rudolf Müssig; Peter Müssig | 4:04 |
| 7. | "Winter in New York" | Geller; Assmann | 3:41 |
| 8. | "Gemeinsam niemals einsam" | Geller; Assmann | 3:45 |
| 9. | "Zuhaus' ist wo das Herz ist" | Geller; Assmann | 3:48 |
| 10. | "10 Millionen Wunder" | Geller; Assmann | 3:41 |
| 11. | "Dies' Jahr (strahlen alle Lichter heller)" | R. Müssig; Christoph Leis-Bendorff | 3:47 |
| 12. | "Früher lag an Weihnacht' richtig Schnee" | R. Müssig; Leis-Bendorff | 3:33 |
| 13. | "Wenn Raketen steigen (Der Silvester Song)" | Geller; Assmann | 3:41 |
| 14. | "Zooom!" | Geller; Assmann | 3:22 |

== Charts ==
=== Weekly charts ===
| Chart (2020) | Peak position |
|---|---|
| Austrian Albums (Ö3 Austria) | 1 |
| German Albums (Offizielle Top 100) | 1 |
| Swiss Albums (Schweizer Hitparade) | 1 |

=== Year-end charts ===
| Chart (2020) | Position |
|---|---|
| Austrian Albums (Ö3 Austria) | 17 |
| German Albums (Official Top 100) | 9 |
| Swiss Albums (Schweizer Hitparade) | 36 |

== Certifications ==
| Region | Certification | Certified units/sales |
|---|---|---|
| Germany (BVMI) | Gold | 100,000^{‡} |
^{‡} Sales+streaming figures based on certification alone.

== Release history ==
| Region | Date | Format | Label | Edition | Ref(s) |
|---|---|---|---|---|---|
| Various | 5 June 2020 | CD; digital download | Telamo | Standard | |
| Various | 16 October 2020 | CD; digital download | Telamo | Winter | |
