= Barcos de Cristal =

Studio album by Thomas Anders
- Released: April 19, 1994 (United States)
- Recorded: 1994
- Genres: Latin pop, dance-pop
- Labels: Polydor, PolyGram
- Producers: Christian De Walden, Ralf Stemmann

Thomas Anders chronology
When Will I See You Again (1993)	Barcos de Cristal (1994)	Souled (1995)

Professional ratings
Review scores
Source	Rating
Allmusic	4/5 stars

Barcos de Cristal (Spanish for "Crystal Ships") is the fifth studio album by singer-songwriter and producer Thomas Anders. It is his first solo album to be sung in Spanish. It was released in 1994 in the United States for Latin America, and was produced by Ralf Stemmann and Christian De Walden (Marta Sánchez). Some tracks were co-written by Thomas Anders a.k.a. Chris Copperfield. A title track was used for the Argentine TV-series and reached No.1 in Argentina. Tu Chica Es Mi Chica was recorded as a duet with Glenn Medeiros. Una Mañana De Sol is a cover in Spanish on When Will I See You Again by The Three Degrees. Luna De Plata was covered by Kiara in 1995.

== Track listing ==
1. "Tonterias" (Chris Copperfield, Ralf Stemmann, Mike Shepstone, Carlos Toro) – 3:43
2. "Luna De Plata" (Steve Singer, Lisa Catherine Cohen, Aides Hidding, Carlos Toro) – 4:01
3. "Miedo De Ti" (Chris Copperfield, Margaret Harris, Ralf Stemmann, Carlos Toro) – 3:38
4. "Tu Chica Es Mi Chica" (Duo Con Glenn Medeiros) (Rick Lane, Lee York, Mike Shepstone, Carlos Toro) – 4:05
5. "Barcos De Cristal" (Steve Singer/Mike Shepstone, Carlos Toro) – 3:55
6. "Una Mañana De Sol" (Kenneth Gamble, Leon Huff, Carlos Toro) – 3:26
7. "Para Sonia" (Chris Copperfield, Mike Shepstone, Carlos Toro) – 4:02
8. "Con Palabras" (Chris Copperfield, Ralf Stemmann, Mike Shepstone, Carlos Toro) – 3:59
9. "Sueños" (Lisa Catherine Cohen/Romano Musumarra, Carlos Toro) – 4:00
10. "Mi Chica Prohibida" (Max Di Carlo, Margaret Harris, Christian De Walden, Ralf Stemmann, Carlos Toro) – 3:30

== Personnel ==
- Produced and arranged by: Christian De Walden and Ralf Stemmann
- Co-Produced by and engineered by: Walter Clissen
- Recorded at Flamingo Café Recording Studio, Studio City, CA
- Mixed at Enterprise Studios, North Hollywood, CA
- Engineered and mixed by: Walter Clissen, Assisted by John Schmidt
- Digitally mastered by: Brian Gardner at Bernie Grundman Mastering, Hollywood, CA
- Design and Art: Graff Group, Miami, FL

== Musicians ==
- Synclavier programming: Ralf Stemmann
- Keyboards: Ralf Stemmann and Randy Kerber
- Acoustic piano: Randy Kerber, Larry Steelman
- Guitars: Tim Pierce
- Acoustic Guitars: Tim Pierce, Paul Jackson Jr.
- Bass: Bob Parr
- Sax and Flute solo: Doug Norwine and Warren Ham
- Horns: "The Heart Attack" Bill Bergman, Greg Smith, Dan Fornero, Dennis Farias and Nick Lane
- Percussion: Paulinho Da Costa
- Stings: "LA Express Strings"
- Background vocals arrangements: Christian De Walden, Kenny O'Brien
- Background vocals: Kenny O'Brien, Brandy Jones, Bambi Jones, Isela Sotelo, Leyla Hoyle, Francis Benitez and Ali Olmo

== See also ==
- Marta Sánchez – Mujer (1993)
