= Miss Sánchez =

Studio album by Marta Sanchez
- Released: 9 July 2007
- Genre: Latin Pop
- Producer: Carlos Jean

Marta Sanchez chronology
| Directo Gira 2005 La Coruña (2006) | Miss Sánchez (2007) | 21 Días (2015) |

Miss Sánchez is the sixth studio album by Spanish singer Marta Sanchez. This is her first album produced by Carlos Jean and her first studio album since Soy Yo released in 2002. This album received gold status on Spain nine weeks after its release, after selling 40,000 copies .

== Recording ==
From the 12 tracks, the singer herself co-wrote five, like the second single "Levantate" (Get Up), which is co-written by her husband Jesús Cabañas and "Tienes Que Vivir" (You Have To Live) dedicated to her daughter Paula.

In this album, Marta Sanchez invited Alaska and the recorded the Carlos Jean's original "Si Me Cambias Los Recuerdos" (If You Change My Memories), an up-tempo track because the singer has stated that she and Alaska could not do a ballad.

Thanks to technology she has a collaboration with Tino Casal on the reworked version of his song "Embrujada". This was picked as the 5th single of the album.

The first single, "Superstar", features a sample from Depeche Mode's hit Just Can't Get Enough, because this was one of the favorite songs of the singer in her youth.

About the title ("Miss Sanchez"), the singer says: "I've always been a miss even when I missbehave" .

The track "Frida y sus Flores" (Frida and her flowers) pays tribute to Mexican painter Frida Kahlo. "Te Imagino" (I Imagine You) came last minute to the recording sessions and is a brand new song from Manuel Alejandro. "Desafinados" is a song from Victoria Gastelo, a new writer, and the singer named it "a classic".

"Reina de la Radio" (Queen of the radio) is a track written by Marta Sanchez about the effect of music on people, and another self-penned song ("High Energy") is a story about the night life.

"Contradicciones" (Contradictions) ia ballad written by Jorge Luis Piloto (who also wrote the #1 Latin hit "Quitame Ese Hombre" sung by Yolandita Monge and later by Pilar Montenegro). "La Noche Que Acabó" (The Night Over) is a piano and voice only recording.

On 29 August 2007 Carlos Jean received a Latin Grammy nomination for Producer of the Year for his work on Miss Sánchez.

== Track listing ==
1. Levántate (Peter Hallström/Lasse Andersson/Nicci Notini/Marta Sánchez/Jesús Cabanas Lumbreras) — 3:54
2. Si Me Cambias Los Recuerdos (Duet with Alaska) (Eva Manzano/Carlos Jean) — 4:24
3. Superstar (Vince Clark/DJ Sammy/Buelent Aris/Oliver Laib/Eva Manzano) — 3:41
4. Reina de la Radio (Grizzly/Mack/Tysper/Breitung/Marta Sánchez/Lucas Álvarez de Toledo) — 3:53
5. Desafinados (Victoria Gastelo) — 4:44
6. Embrujada (Duet with Tino Casal) (José Celestino Casal Álvarez) — 3:47
7. Contradicciones (Jorge Luis Piloto) — 3:12
8. High Energy (Marta Sánchez) — 4:16
9. Te Imagino (Manuel Alejandro) — 3:49
10. Frida y sus Flores (Marta Sánchez/Carlos Jean) — 4:19
11. Tienes Que Vivir (Marta Sánchez/Sacha J. Fernandez/Ignacio Sotomayor) — 5:00
12. La Noche Que Acabó (Christian De Walden/Alessandra Flora/Luigi Patruno/Luigi Rana/Lori Barth) — 3:23
