= When Will I See You Again (Thomas Anders album) =

Studio album by Thomas Anders
- Released: 23 June 1993
- Recorded: 1993
- Genre: Pop, blue-eyed soul
- Label: Polydor
- Producer: Christian De Walden, Ralf Stemmann

Thomas Anders chronology
Down on Sunset (1992)	When Will I See You Again (1993)	Barcos De Cristal (1994)

Singles from When Will I See You Again
- 1. "When Will I See You Again (Duet With The Three Degrees)" Released: 4 June 1993; 2. "I'll Love You Forever" Released: 22 September 1993; 3. "Stay a Little Longer" Released: 1993; 4. "The Love in Me" Released: 21 January 1994

When Will I See You Again is the fourth studio album by German singer-songwriter and producer Thomas Anders. It was released in 1993, and was produced by Ralf Stemmann and Christian De Walden (Amanda Lear). It features a remake of The Three Degrees' classics "When Will I See You Again". "I'll Love You Forever", "The Love in Me", and "When Will I See You Again" (duet with The Three Degrees) were released as singles.

"Marathon of Life" was written by Ralf Stemmann for the Swedish film "Stockholm Marathon", where Anders played a small part.

== Track listing ==
1. "When Will I See You Again" (duet With The Three Degrees) (Kenneth Gamble, Leon Huff) – 3:32
2. "Dangerous Lies" (Thomas Anders, Margaret Harris, Ralf Stemmann) – 3:44
3. "I'll Love You Forever" (Max Di Carlo, Margaret Harris, Christian De Walden, Ralf Stemmann) – 3:46
4. "Midnight" (Lisa Catherine Cohen/Romano Musumarra) – 4:04
5. "Marathon Of Life" (Margaret Harris, Thomas Anders, Christian De Walden, Ralf Stemmann) – 3:44
6. "Is It My Love" (Thomas Anders, Ralf Stemmann, Mike Shepstone) – 3:43
7. "The Love In Me" (Werner Hammer, Timothy Touchton, Margaret Harris) – 4:09
8. "Stay A Little Longer" (Thomas Anders, Ralf Stemmann, Mike Shepstone) – 3:53
9. "Dance In Heaven" (Thomas Anders, Mike Shepstone) – 4:06
10. "Shipwrecked" (Thomas Anders, Ralf Stemmann, Mike Shepstone) – 3:49
11. "Hold My Hand" (Margaret Harris, Thomas Anders, Markus Krochmann, Christian Blau) – 3:45
12. "When Will I See You Again (Unplugged Version)" (Kenneth Gamble, Leon Huff) – 2:59

== Personnel ==
- Produced and arranged by: Christian De Walden and Ralf Stemmann
- Co-Produced by and engineered by: Walter Clissen
- Recorded at Flamingo Café Recording Studio, Studio City, CA
- Mixed at Enterprise Studios, North Hollywood, CA
- Engineered and mixed by: Walter Clissen, Assisted by John Schmidt
- Digitally mastered by: Brian Gardner at Bernie Grundman Mastering, Hollywood, CA
- Cover-Design : PS Design, Hamburg
- Photos: Dieter Eikelpoth

== Musicians ==
- Synclavier programming: Ralf Stemmann
- Keyboards: Ralf Stemmann and Randy Kerber
- Acoustic piano: Randy Kerber, Larry Steelman
- Guitars: Tim Pierce
- Acoustic Guitars: Tim Pierce, Paul Jackson Jr.
- Bass: Bob Parr
- Sax and Flute solo: Doug Norwine and Warren Ham
- Horns: "The Heart Attack Horns" Bill Bergman, Greg Smith, Dan Fornero, Dennis Farias and Nick Lane
- Percussion: Paulinho Da Costa
- Stings: "LA Express Strings"
- Background vocals arrangements: Christian De Walden
- Background vocals: Eric Paletti, Warren Ham, Michael Mishaw, Kenny O'Brien, Brandy Jones, Bambi Jones
- The Three Degrees (appears courtesy of BMG/Ariola)

== Music videos ==
- When Will I See You Again (duet With The Three Degrees) was released on Thomas Anders – The DVD-Collection.
