= Soy Yo =

Soy Yo may refer to:

== Music ==
- "Soy Yo" (Bomba Estéreo song), 2015
- Soy Yo (Los Yonic's album), 1976
- Soy Yo (Marta Sánchez album), 2002
  - "Soy Yo" (Marta Sánchez song), 2002
- Soy Yo (Kany García album), 2018
- "Soy Yo" (Don Omar song), 2022

== See also ==
- Yo Soy (disambiguation)
