= La Que Nunca Se Rinde =

Single by Marta Sánchez
- Released: September 24, 2014
- Genre: Dance-pop
- Length: 3:27
- Label: Entrearte
- Songwriter: Marta Sánchez
- Producer: Pablo Ochando

Marta Sánchez singles chronology
"Y, ¿Si Fuera Ella?" (2013)	"La Que Nunca Se Rinde" (2014)

"La Que Nunca Se Rinde" (English: The One Who Never Gives Up) is a song by Spanish recording artist Marta Sánchez. It was released as a single from her upcoming seventh studio album on September 24, 2014 through digital distribution. The song was written by Sánchez and produced by Pablo Ochando.

== Chart performance ==
Chart (2014)	Peak position
Spanish Singles Chart	11
