= Down on Sunset =

Studio album by Thomas Anders
- Released: 1 September 1992
- Recorded: 1992
- Genres: Pop, latin pop
- Labels: Polydor, PolyGram
- Producers: Christian De Walden, Ralf Stemmann

Thomas Anders chronology
Whispers (1991)	Down on Sunset (1992)	When Will I See You Again (1993)

How Deep Is Your Love

Singles from Down on Sunset
- 1. "How Deep is Your Love" Released: June 1992

Down on Sunset is the third studio album by singer-songwriter and producer Thomas Anders, released in 1992. It is produced by Ralf Stemmann and Christian De Walden (Brigitte Nielsen) and contains Neil Sedaka's classic Laughter in the Rain. Several songs were co-written by Thomas Anders a.k.a. Chris Copperfield. The same year, the album was re-released in Japan. How Deep Is Your Love and Standing Alone (duet with Glenn Medeiros) were released as singles. In 1995, My One And Only was covered in Spanish by Kiara and How Deep Is Your Love was covered by Danny de Munk. In 1998, this album was re-released as How Deep Is Your Love by Spectrum and Universal.

== Track listing ==
1. "How Deep Is Your Love" (Marc Cassandra/ Chris Copperfield, Marc Cassandra, Mike Shepstone) – 4:06
2. "You Have Rescued Me" (Mimmo Castelli, Chris Copperfield / Mike Shepstone, Chris Copperfield) – 3:51
3. "My One And Only" (Steve Singer, Lisa Catherine Cohen, Aides Hidding) – 4:04
4. "Across The World Tonight" (Steve Singer/Mike Shepstone) – 4:48
5. "Standing Alone" (Duet With Glenn Medeiros) (Rick Lane, Lee York/Mike Shepstone) – 3:59
6. "Laughter In The Rain" (Neil Sedaka/Phil Cody) – 3:15
7. "Turn Around" (Mimmo Castelli, Ralf Stemmann, Chris Copperfield / Mike Shepstone, Chris Copperfield) – 3:57
8. "If You Could Only See Me Now" (Ralf Stemmann/ Chris Copperfield, Mike Shepstone) – 3:48
9. "A Little At A Time" (Austin Roberts, Todd Cerney, Nat Kipner) – 3:36
10. "Thru With Love" (Marc Cassandra, Chris Copperfield / Mike Shepstone, Chris Copperfield) – 4:22
11. "Cruising Down On Sunset" (Marc Cassandra, Chris Copperfield, Ralf Stemmann/Mike Shepstone, Marc Anderson) – 3:09

== Personnel ==
- Produced and arranged by: Christian De Walden and Ralf Stemmann
- Recorded and Mixed by: Walter Clissen
- Recorded at Flamingo Café Recording Studio, Los Angeles
- Mixed at Ground Control Studios, Santa Monica, California
- Engineered by: Walter Clissen, assisted by Jimmy Busceme and Esteban Cavoti
- Digitally mastered by: Brian Gardner at Bernie Grundman Mastering, Hollywood
- Cover-Design: PS Grafik, Hamburg
- Photos: Thomas Muller

== Musicians ==
- Synclavier programming: Ralf Stemmann
- Keyboards and Synthesizers: Ralf Stemmann and Patrick Moraz
- Acoustic piano: Patrick Moraz, Larry Steelman
- Guitars: Tim Pierce
- Acoustic Guitars: Tim Pierce, Ramon Stagnaro
- Bass: Bob Parr
- Sax and Flute solo: Doug Norwine
- Horns: "The Heart Attack Horns" Bill Bergman, Greg Smith, Roy Wiegand, Dennis Farias and Nick Lane
- Percussion: Paulinho Da Costa
- Stings: "LA Express Strings"
- Background vocals arrangements: Christian De Walden
- Background vocals: Eric Paletti, Daniel O'Brien, Warren Ham, Michael Mishaw, Kenny O'Brien
- Radio Announcer: Banana Joe (appears courtesy of Premiere Radio Networks)

== Music videos ==
- Standing Alone (duet with Glenn Medeiros) was released as a music video and featured on Thomas Anders – The DVD-Collection.

== See also ==
Brigitte Nielsen – I'm The One... Nobody Else (1992)
