= Yo Soy =

Yo Soy may refer to:

- Yo Soy 132, a Mexican protest movement for the democratization of the country and its media
- Yo Soy (Yolandita Monge album), 1973
- Yo Soy (Pee Wee album), 2009
- Yo Soy (Mariana Ochoa album), 2004
- Yo Soy, album by Américo
- Revés/Yo Soy, 1997 album by Café Tacuba
- Yo Soy (song), a 2021 song by Paulina Rubio
- Yo Soy (Peruvian TV series), Peruvian reality show, 2012-present
- Yo soy Mina, a 2011 album by Mina

== See also ==
- Soy Yo (disambiguation)
