= Luz Rios =

Luz Ríos
- Born: Luz Ríos
- Origin: Guerrero, Mexico
- Genres: Latin pop, regional Mexican, Pop-rock
- Occupations: Singer, songwriter
- Instrument: Vocals
- Years active: 1999–present
- Label: LCR Records (1999–present)
- Website: luzrios.com

Luz Ríos (Guerrero) is a Mexican-born California-based American pop singer and songwriter.

Rios received world-wide recognition with her 4th studio album, "Aire" featuring the hit single "Aire". The song featured a duet with Mexican icon singer-songwriter Joan Sebastian. The album gained Rios nominations at the 2009 Latin Grammys for "Best New Artist" and "Best Female Pop Vocal Album" as well as nominations at the 2009 Latin Billboard Music Awards for "Hot Latin Song of the Year"- Vocal Event for her duet with Joan Sebastian and "Regional Mexican Airplay Song of the Year"- Female Category. The hit single "Aire" penned by Luz peaked at 32 on the Latin Billboard Charts.

== Pre-solo career ==
One of ten siblings born into a musical family from Tlacotepec in Guerrero, Mexico, Latin pop singer Luz Rios grew up in Cuernavaca, in the Mexican state of Morelos. At the age of 16, Rios emigrated to the U.S. Later, a teenage Rios accompanied by four of her siblings formed the band, Morelos Show, where Rios played the drums and sang lead vocals. Rios and her family settled in the Ontario, CA area, where the group became so popular that they received steady work in area clubs.

== Solo career ==
=== 1999–2006 ===
After two years with the group, Rios began her solo career and in 1999, debuted her first studio album, Ayer, Hoy y Siempre, a collection of pop ballads. Rios began to take vocal lessons with the renowned Seth Riggs, a veteran who has worked with the likes of Stevie Wonder, Kelly Clarkson, Faith Hill, and Julio Iglesias, to name a few.

By 2003, she had played in several venues in the U. S. and Spain and as a result of her talented skills as a songwriter, signed an exclusive worldwide publishing agreement with music giant Warner Chappell.

In 2004 Luz entered the studio to work on her 2nd album, De Mi Corazón, which was composed of pop ballads that shift easily between Mexican regional styles like cumbia and ranchera, as well as incorporating a little salsa, samba, and rock and roll.

Rios wrote all of the songs on the album except, "Te Quiero," which was co-written with Luigi Giraldo and recorded in A.B. Quintanilla's McAllen studio and "Vivir con Peter Pan" which was written by world-renowned Carlo Toro Moro and produced by Christian Dewalden, whose credits include Marta Sánchez, Paulina Rubio, Paloma San Basilio, among others.

In 2006, Luz entered the studio once again for her 3rd self-titled album, Luz Rios, featuring the hit song "Llamame" written by the legendary Jorge Luis Borrego.

=== 2008 ===
In 2008, Rios releases her 4th and most successful studio album "Aire" distributed by Selecto Hits. The single "Aire", written by Rios, featuring a duet with Joan Sebastian peaks at 32 on the Latin Billboard Charts and marks Joan Sebastian's first appearance ever on a song not written by himself. The song also peaked at 24 on the Regional Mexican Songs Charts and 27 on the Latin Pop Charts.

=== 2009 ===
In 2009, Rios released her 5th studio album, Humano, featuring the hit single "Es Lo Que Das Que Cuenta" a translation and adaptation of Vince Gill's "What You Give Away". The album also included a DVD of behind the scenes footage for her video "Aire" ft. Joan Sebastian.

Rios performed live at the 9th Annual Latin Grammy Awards at the Toyota Center in Houston, Texas in front of over 12 million viewers and received two Latin Grammy Nominations for "Best New Artist" and "Best Female Pop Vocal Album" for "Aire".

"Aire" also gained Rios Latin Billboard nominations for "Hot Latin Song of the Year"- Vocal Event for her duet with Joan Sebastian and "Regional Mexican Airplay Song of the Year"- Female Category.

She then toured with Joan Sebastian.

That same year she debuted her Mariachi show at the Los Angeles Theater Company and performed the National Anthem at the Dodger Stadium for Viva Los Dodgers Day.

=== 2010 ===
At the 2010 Premios Lo Nuestro Awards held at the American Airlines Arena in Miami, Florida, Rios received a nomination for "Best New Artist". Rios also received an industry award for BMI performing Rights Society.

Currently Luz Rios is working on her 6th Studio Album. The new album is set to release in its entirety by the end of 2011.

== Miscellaneous ==
- Formed part of the video "We Are The World for Haiti in Spanish"
- "Humano" Longest playing single on the Latin BDS charts
- Luz Rios records duet with JD "Tu Amor"

== Philanthropy and humanitarian work ==
Beyond the music, Luz has contributed a lot to the Latino community and is involved with:

- Loma Linda Hospital
- Children's Hospital of Los Angeles
- Musicares Hurricane Katrina Relief Concert
- Girl Scouts of Greater Los Angeles

And community events like:

- Chivas USA
- City of Huntington Park Parade
- Mexican Independence Parade Los Angeles

== Discography ==
=== Albums ===
- 1999: Ayer, Hoy y Siempre
- 2004: De Mi Corazón
- 2005: Luz Ríos
- 2008: Aire
- 2009: Humano
- 2010: De Luz Con Amor
- 2013: México Te Llevo En El Alma
