= History (Thomas Anders album) =

Studio album by Thomas Anders
- Released: 27 May 2016
- Label: White Shell
- Producer: Christian Geller

Thomas Anders chronology
Christmas for You (2012)	History (2016)	Pures Leben (2017)

History is the twelfth studio album by German singer Thomas Anders. It was released by White Shell Music on 27 May 2016 in German-speaking Europe. Produced by Christian Geller, the album consists mainly of new recordings of former Modern Talking songs. It debuted and peaked at number 42 on the German Albums Chart.

== Track listing ==
All tracks produced by Christian Geller.

No.	Title	Writer(s)	Length
1.	"You're My Heart, You're My Soul" (New Hit Version)	Dieter Bohlen	3:28
2.	"You Can Win If You Want" (New Hit Version)	Bohlen	3:45
3.	"Cheri, Cheri Lady" (New Hit Version)	Bohlen	3:36
4.	"Brother Louie" (New Hit Version)	Bohlen	3:47
5.	"Atlantis Is Calling (S.O.S. for Love)" (New Hit Version)	Bohlen	3:55
6.	"Geronimo's Cadillac" (New Hit Version)	Bohlen	3:40
7.	"Jet Airliner" (New Hit Version)	Bohlen	3:59
8.	"In 100 Years" (New Hit Version)	Bohlen	4:02
9.	"You Are Not Alone" (New Hit Version)	Bohlen	3:47
10.	"Sexy, Sexy Lover" (New Hit Version)	Bohlen	3:40
11.	"Lunatic"	Geller	3:22
12.	"Take the Chance"	Geller	3:39

Deluxe edition
No.	Title	Writer(s)	Length
11.	"Win the Race" (New Hit Version)	Bohlen	3:42
12.	"Juliet" (New Hit Version)	Bohlen	3:41
13.	"Lunatic"	Geller	3:22
14.	"Take the Chance"	Geller	3:39

== Charts ==
Chart (2016)	Peak position
German Albums (Offizielle Top 100)	42

== Release history ==
Region	Date	Format	Label	Ref(s)
Various	27 May 2016	CD; digital download	White Shell Music	
