= Azabache =

Studio album by Marta Sánchez
- Released: 22 April 1997
- Genre: Latin pop
- Label: Mercury, Polygram
- Producer: Christian De Walden, Andres Levin, Nile Rodgers, Camus Celli, Robyn Smith, Stephen Budd

Marta Sánchez chronology
Mi Mundo (1995)	Azabache (1997)	Desconocida (1998)

Azabache (Spanish: "jet (lignite)") is the third studio album by Spanish singer Marta Sánchez. This was released in 1997. On this album more producers were involved (Andres Levin, Nile Rodgers, Camus Celli, Robyn Smith and Stephen Budd) along with longtime musical partner Christian De Walden. They created a rock oriented album, instead of the pop music Marta recorded for her first and second albums. Critical reactions were mostly positive. The first single "Moja Mi Corazón", features guitar player Slash and was produced by Nile Rodgers. The album yielded five singles: "Negro Azabache", "Algo Tienes", "Ya Ves" and "Amor Perdido". While promoting this album, Marta recorded along with opera singer Andrea Bocelli the song "Vivo por Ella", which became a worldwide smash hit and was later included on the international pressings of "Azabache". The majority of the tracks were recorded in English (as usual for any Marta Sanchez album) and were released under the title One Step Closer.

== Track listing ==
=== Spanish version: Azabache ===
#	Title	composition	duration
1	"Moja Mi Corazón" (duet with Slash)	Levin/Celli/Osorio) producción Nile Rodgers	4:54
2	"Negro azabache"	Ware/Sawyer/Adaptaciçon al español: C. Toro	5:14
3	"Sexy look"	Max Di Carlo/Christian de Walden/Marta Sánchez	3:52
4	"Algo tienes"	Marta Sánchez	4:22
5	"Amor perdido"	Max Di Carlo/Christian de Walden/Carlos Toro	4:12
6	"Ya ves"	B. Jones/R. Medhurst/R. Smith/ Adapt. Español: C. Toro	4:17
7	"Lámpara mágica"	Rodgers/Levin/Celli) producción Nile Rodgers	4:59
8	"El juego ha terminado"	Viva Marroquin/Carlos Toro/Ludis Sorto/Steve Singer	4:00
9	"Las historias más bonitas"	Max Di Carlo/Christian de Walden/Carlos Toro	4:05
10	"Sólo tú"	Marta Sánchez/Carlos Toro	3:44
11	"Y ahora dices que"	Max Di Carlo/Christian de Walden/Marta Sánchez	4:15
12	"Vuela"	Max Di Carlo/Ludis Sorto/Carlos Toro	3:48

=== English version: One Step Closer ===
#	Title	composition	duration
1	"One step closer (with Slash)"	English version: Darell Spencer/Fernando Osorio/Andres Levin/ producción Nile Rodgers	4:55
2	"If I ever lose this heaven"	Ware/Sawyer	5:02
3	"Sexy look"	Max Di Carlo/Christian de Walden/Marta Sánchez/Adaptación al ingles: Lori Barth	3:39
4	Vivo por ella (dueto con Andrea Bocelli)	Spanish lyrics: Luis Gómez-Escolar/Music: V. Zelli - M. Mengali - G. Panceri	4:23
5	"Death and you"	Rafa Legisima/Carlos de France/Adaptación: Neroli McSherry	4:42
6	"The game is finally over"	Viva Marroquin/Carlos Toro Montoro/Ludis Sorto/Steve Singer/Adaptación al ingles: Lori Barth	3:58
7	"True devotion"	Christian de Walden/Max Di Carlo/Lori Barth	3:11
8	Just forget about it	Max Di Carlo/Christian de Walden/Carlos Toro Montoro/Letra en ingles: Lori Barth	3:41
9	I'll miss you	Max Di Carlo/Christian de Walden/Carlos Toro Montoro/Adaptación al ingles: Elizabeth Mehr	4:26
10	Such a mystery	Christian de Walden/Max Di Carlo/Margaret Harris	4:03
11	La belleza	Carlos Toro Montoro	3:27
12	Moja mi corazón (con Slash)	Fernando Osorio/Andrés Levin) producción Nile Rodgers	4:57

== Personnel ==
For the tracks "Moja Mi Corazón" and "Lampara Mágica"

- Producers: Andres Levin, Nile Rodgers and Camus Celli
- Acoustic guitar: Raúl Conte
- Lead guitar: Slash
- Guitars: Nile Rodgers
- Bass: Andy Hess
- Keyboards and percussions: C-n-A
- Recorded at Le Crib Svuga Svuga & Right Track Studios by Gary Tole
- Mixed at Right Track Studios by C-n-A and Nile Rodgers
- Photography: J.M. Ferratier
- Stylist: Beatriz Alvarez
- Design: Pedro Delgado

For the tracks "Negro Azabache" and "Ya Ves"

- Producers: Robyn Smith and Stephen Budd
- Keyboards programming: Robyn Smith
- Rap ("Ya Ves"): Sarjant D
- Sax: "Snake" Davis
- Guitar: Albert Rutland

For the rest of the tracks

- Producers: Christian De Walden and Max DiCarlo
- Co-Producer and engineer: Walter Clissen
- Recorder and mixer: Walter Clissen and Jeff Griffin
- Drums: John Robinson
- Bass: Bob Glaub
- Acoustic piano: Randy Waldman
- Guitars: John Hannah and Max DiCarlo
- Keyboards and synthesizers: Max DiCarlo
- Percussion: Efrain Toro
- Sax: Doug Norwine
- Background vocals: Thania Sanchez, Gisa Vatchy, Bambi Jones and Brandy Jones

== Chart performance ==
Chart	Single	Year	Peak
Billboard Hot Latin Tracks	"Vivo Por Ella" (Vivo Per Lei) (Duet with Andrea Bocelli)	1998	16
Billboard Hot Latin Tracks	"Moja Mi Corazón"	1997	17
