= Judy (Thomas Anders song) =

Single by Thomas Anders
- B-side: "Liebe Ist Ein Zweites Leben"
- Released: August 1980 (Germany)
- Recorded: 1980
- Genre: Schlager
- Length: 3:57
- Label: CBS
- Songwriter(s): Norbert Hammerschmidt; Randy Vanwarmer
- Producer(s): Daniel David

Thomas Anders singles chronology
"Judy" (1980)	"Du Weinst Um Ihn" (1980)

"Judy" is a schlager ballad by German singer Thomas Anders. It was Thomas Anders' first single, released in 1980 on Columbia Records.

The song is a German cover version of Randy VanWarmer's "Call Me", from the album Warmer.

== Track listing ==
CBS S 8873 7"

1. "Judy" (Norbert Hammerschmidt/Randy Vanwarmer) - 4:50
2. "Liebe Ist Ein Zweites Leben" (Daniel David/Norbert Hammerschmidt/Renus Gern) - 3:50
