= Christmas for You =

Studio album by Thomas Anders
- Released: 16 November 2012
- Label: Electrola; EMI
- Producer: Thomas Anders; Achim Brochhausen

Thomas Anders chronology
Strong (2010)	Christmas for You (2012)	History (2016)

Christmas for You is the eleventh studio album by German singer Thomas Anders. It was released by Electrola on 16 November 2012 in German-speaking Europe. His first Christmas album, it debuted and peaked at number 99 on the German Albums Chart.

== Track listing ==
All tracks produced by Achim Brochhausen and Thomas Anders.

No.	Title	Writer(s)	Length
1.	"It Must Have Been the Mistletoe"	Doug Konecky; Justin Wilde	3:20
2.	"Christmas Is Just Around the Corner"	Barry Manilow; Bruce Sussmann	2:42
3.	"Sleigh Ride"	Leroy Anderson; Mitchell Parish	2:47
4.	"The Christmas Song"	Robert Wells; Mel Tormé	3:13
5.	"It's the Most Wonderful Time of the Year"	Edward Pola; George Wyle	3:38
6.	"Last Christmas"	George Michael	4:35
7.	"Silverbells"	Anders; Brochhausen; Ina Wolff	4:00
8.	"It's Christmas Time"	Oscar Meixner; Morten Kuegler	3:19
9.	"Kisses for Christmas"	Anders; Brochhausen; Wolff	3:11
10.	"Can You Hear the Snowflakes Falling"	Thomas Anders; Henry Albert, Jr.	2:28
11.	"Have Yourself a Merry Little Christmas"	Hugh Martin; Ralph Blane	3:00
12.	"A Christmas Love Song"	Alan Bergman; Marilyn Bergman; Johnny Mandel	3:32
13.	"I'll Be Home for Christmas"	Kim Gannon; Walter Kent	3:39
14.	"Silent Night"	Traditional	3:42
15.	"It's Just Another New Year's Eve"	Manilow; Marty Panzer	3:39

Deluxe edition – bonus disc
No.	Title	Writer(s)	Length
1.	"Der Tannenbaum"	Hans Christian Andersen	21:03
2.	"Knecht Ruprecht"	Theodor Storm	1:47
3.	"Marry You"	Dominik Pobot	2:42
4.	"Stille Nacht"	Traditional	3:39

== Charts ==
Chart (2012)	Peak position
German Albums (Offizielle Top 100)	99

== Release history ==
Region	Date	Format	Label	Ref(s)
Various	16 November 2012	CD; digital download	Electrola; EMI	
