= Ewig mit dir =

Studio album by Thomas Anders
- Released: 19 October 2018
- Length: 49:18
- Label: Warner
- Producer: Christian Geller

Thomas Anders chronology
Pures Leben (2017)	Ewig mit dir (2018)	Cosmic (2021)

Ewig mir dir ("Forever with You") is the fourteenth studio album by German singer Thomas Anders. It was released by the Warner Music Group on 19 October 2018. Produced by Christian Geller, it peaked at number 12 on the German Albums Chart.

== Track listing ==
All tracks produced by Christian Geller.

No.	Title	Writer(s)	Length
1.	"Das Leben ist jetzt"	Hens Hensen; Wolfgang Hofer	3:23
2.	"Sie sagte doch sie liebt mich" (featuring Florian Silbereisen)	Geller; Christoph Assmann; Thomas Anders; Tobias Reitz	3:43
3.	"Ewig mit dir"	Marc Hiller; Patrick Pyke Salmy; Ricardo Muñoz Repko; Simon Allert	3:52
4.	"Wir sind eins"	Elzbieta Steinmetz; Mathias Metten Klyve; Steffen Graef	3:13
5.	"Menschen"	The Killers	4:05
6.	"So wie es ist"	Martin Maria Haller; Matthäus Jaschik; Sebastian Henzel	3:22
7.	"Gemeinsam allein"	Assmann; Steinmetz; Till Münzbergerl	3:22
8.	"Hätte, wäre, wenn"	Florian Sczesny; Peter Trevisan	3:36
9.	"Ich wollte mich nie mehr verlieben"	Steinmetz; Steffen Graef	3:22
10.	"Viva la vida"	Florian Sczesny; Trevisan; Roman Lüth	3:10
11.	"Giganten"	Geller; Assmann; Anders	3:03
12.	"Wunder gibt es auch für dich"	Sczesny; Trevisan; Lüth	3:43
13.	"Was bleibt"	Marc Lennard; Allert	3:24
14.	"Hätt's nie ohne dich geschafft"	Gregor Meyle	3:35

== Charts ==
Chart (2018)	Peak position
Austrian Albums (Ö3 Austria)	30
German Albums (Offizielle Top 100)	12
Swiss Albums (Schweizer Hitparade)	60

== Release history ==
Region	Date	Format	Label	Ref(s)
Various	19 October 2018	CD; digital download	Warner Music Group	
