= Pures Leben =

Studio album by Thomas Anders
- Released: 7 April 2017
- Length: 48:01
- Label: Warner
- Producer: Christian Geller

Thomas Anders chronology
History (2016)	Pures Leben (2017)	Ewig mit dir (2018)

Pures Leben ("Pure Life") is the thirteenth studio album by German singer Thomas Anders. It was released by the Warner Music Group on 7 April 2017. Produced by Christian Geller, it peaked at number 14 on the German albums chart.

== Track listing ==
All tracks produced by Christian Geller.

No.	Title	Writer(s)	Length
1.	"Der beste Tag meines Lebens"	Marc Lennard; Simon Allert	3:25
2.	"Sternenregen"	Patrick Salmi; Ricardo Munoz Repko; Sebastian Bosum	3:42
3.	"Das Lied das Leben heißt"	Joe Walter; Robert Redweik	3:56
4.	"Feuerwerk"	Emanuel Treu; Hubert Molander	3:28
5.	"Sie und ich und du"	Tobias Rietz; Dietmar Kawohl	4:38
6.	"Unendlich"	Geller; Thomas Anders	3:25
7.	"Schwerelos"	Florian Sczesny; Peter Trevisan; Tom Deininger	4:09
8.	"Traumtänzer"	Alexander Zuckowski; Arne Jörgensen	3:28
9.	"Zurück zu dir"	André Franke; Joachim Horn-Bernges	3:40
10.	"Träume"	David Trapp; Sczesny; Trevisan	3:28
11.	"Ein Augenblick, der alles dreht"	Geller; Anders; Reitz	3:20
12.	"Odyssee"	Mitch Keller; Oliver Lukas; Stefan Köhne; Thomas Widrat	3:40
13.	"Fliegen"	Beatrice Reszat; Geller; Anders	3:38

== Charts ==
Chart (2017)	Peak position
Austrian Albums (Ö3 Austria)	31
German Albums (Offizielle Top 100)	14
Swiss Albums (Schweizer Hitparade)	51

== Release history ==
Region	Date	Format	Label	Ref(s)
Various	7 April 2017	CD; digital download	Warner Music Group	
