= Songs Forever =

Studio album by Thomas Anders
- Released: 3 March 2006
- Genre: Swing
- Label: Edel
- Producer: Thomas Anders; Achim Brochhausen; Lukas Hilbert; Peter Ries

Thomas Anders chronology
This Time (2004)	Songs Forever (2006)	Strong (2010)

Songs Forever is the ninth studio album by German singer Thomas Anders. It was released by Edel Records on 3 March 2006. Consisting mainly of popular covers, it debuted and peaked at number 43 on the German Albums Chart.

== Track listing ==
All tracks co-produced by Thomas Anders, Achim Brochhausen, and Peter Ries; except track 14, produced by Lukas Hilbert.

No.	Title	Writer(s)	Length
1.	"Songs That Live Forever"	Anders; Hilbert; Brochhausen	3:02
2.	"Cry for Help"	Rick Astley; Rob Fisher	4:17
3.	"For Your Eyes Only"	Bill Conti; Michael Leeson	4:06
4.	"Have I Told You Lately"	Van Morrison	3:45
5.	"All Around The World"	Lisa Stansfield; Ian Devaney; Andy Morris	4:01
6.	"Some People"	Alan Tarney	4:02
7.	"Tell It to My Heart"	Seth Swirsky; Ernie Gold	4:26
8.	"Do You Really Want to Hurt Me"	Boy George	3:37
9.	"Is This Love"	John Sykes; David Coverdale	3:36
10.	"Sweet Dreams (Are Made of This)"	David A. Stewart; Annie Lennox	4:39
11.	"Arthur's Theme"	Burt Bacharach; Christopher Cross	4:08
12.	"You're My Heart, You're My Soul"	Dieter Bohlen	4:25
13.	"True"	Gary James Kemp	4:54

Special fan edition – bonus track
No.	Title	Writer(s)	Length
14.	"Songs That Live Forever" (Special Grand Prix Version)	Anders; Hilbert; Brochhausen	3:02

== Personnel and credits ==
Adapted from album booklet.

- Thomas Anders – executive producer, mixing, producer
- Achim Brochhausen – mixing, producer
- Manfred Faust-Senn – recording
- Lukas Hilbert – producer (reissue)
- Peter Ries – mixing, producer

== Charts ==
Chart (2006)	Peak position
German Albums (Offizielle Top 100)	43
