= Live Concert (album) =

Live album by Thomas Anders
- Released: 15 January 1997
- Recorded: 1997
- Genre: Jazz
- Producer: Thomas Anders

Thomas Anders chronology
Souled (1995)	Live Concert (1997)	This Time (2004)

Live Concert is the seventh album by singer-songwriter and producer Thomas Anders. It is his first solo album to be recorded live. The album was released in 1997 with a jazz band and features such evergreens as Cole Porter's "Night and Day", Bobby Darin's "Beyond the Sea", and Barry Manilow's "When October Goes".

== Track listing ==
1. "Paradise Café" (Barry Manilow, Bruce Sussman, Jack Feldman) – 4:58
2. "Can't Teach My Old Heart New Tricks" (Richard A. Whiting, Johnny Mercer) – 4:06
3. "Just Remember" (Manilow, Mercer) – 3:40
4. "Fly Me to the Moon" (Bart Howard) – 3:29
5. "When October Goes" (Manilow, Mercer) – 5:16
6. "How Do You Keep the Music Playing?" (Featuring Lilly Thornton) (Michel Legrand, A. & M. Begmann) – 5:19
7. "Night and Day" (Cole Porter) – 6:09
8. "Beyond the Sea" (Charles Trenet, Jack Lawrence) – 5:08
9. "Moonlight in Vermont" (John Blackburn, Karl Suessdorf) – 4:32

== Personnel ==
- Executive Producer: Thomas Anders
- Meinhard "Obi" Jenne - drums
- Claus Koch - saxophone
- Roland Doringer - bass
- Volker Dorsch - piano
- Lilly Thornton - backing vocals
- Recorded live at Brasserie Faustus
