= Strong (Thomas Anders album) =

Studio album by Thomas Anders
- Released: 11 February 2010
- Length: 68:12
- Label: CD Land
- Producer: Vladimir Nichiporuk

Thomas Anders chronology
| Songs Forever (2006) | Strong (2010) | Christmas for You (2012) |

Strong is the tenth studio album by German singer Thomas Anders. It was first released by CD Land on 11 February 2010 in Russia.

== Track listing ==
All tracks written by Sergey Revtov and produced by Vladimir Nichiporuk.

Standard edition
| No. | Title | Length |
|---|---|---|
| 1. | "Why Do You Cry?" | 3:38 |
| 2. | "Stay with Me" | 3:55 |
| 3. | "Make You" | 3:35 |
| 4. | "Stop!" | 3:09 |
| 5. | "You Will Be Mine" | 4:06 |
| 6. | "Suddenly" | 3:22 |
| 7. | "Music, Dance" | 3:23 |
| 8. | "My Angel" | 3:21 |
| 9. | "I'll Be Strong" | 3:37 |
| 10. | "Clear Sign" | 3:27 |
| 11. | "One More Chance" | 3:37 |
| 12. | "I Wanna" | 2:53 |
| 13. | "Sorry, Baby" | 3:17 |
| 14. | "Why Do You Cry?" (Acoustic Piano Version) | 3:47 |

Bonus tracks
| No. | Title | Length |
|---|---|---|
| 15. | "Why Do You Cry?" (Silver & Mesmer Extended Club Mix) | 5:29 |
| 16. | "Make You" (DJ Shevtsov Mix) | 6:25 |
| 17. | "Make You" (DJ Denis Rublev & DJ Natasha Baccardi Remix) | 7:31 |

Premium edition (CD 2)
| No. | Title | Length |
|---|---|---|
| 1. | "Why Do You Cry?" (Pheromons Project Remix) | 5:43 |
| 2. | "Why Do You Cry?" (Soho Jeff & Black Version) | 6:09 |
| 3. | "Why Do You Cry?" (DJ Nejtrino & DJ Kirill Clash Radio Edit) | 3:40 |
| 4. | "Why Do You Cry?" (DJ Nejtrino & DJ Kirill Extended Mix) | 5:41 |
| 5. | "Why Do You Cry?" (Silver & Mesmer Radio Edit) | 3:41 |
| 6. | "Why Do You Cry?" (Silver & Mesmer Drive Mix) | 3:46 |
| 7. | "Why Do You Cry?" (Silver & Mesmer Extended Club Mix) | 6:49 |
| 8. | "Why Do You Cry?" (G.ll.v Space Remix) | 6:34 |
| 9. | "Why Do You Cry?" (DJ Vini Radio Edit) | 4:17 |
| 10. | "Why Do You Cry?" (DJ Vini Club Version) | 6:18 |
| 11. | "Why Do You Cry?" (Danny Verde Club Mix) | 6:38 |
| 12. | "Make You" (Alex AsterO & Evan Sax Radio Mix) | 6:38 |
| 13. | "Make You" (Alex AsterO & Evan Club Radio Mix) | 3:13 |
| 14. | "Make You" (Aleks Milano Summer Mix) | 5:12 |

Oriflame edition
| No. | Title | Length |
|---|---|---|
| 1. | "Why Do You Cry?" | 3:38 |
| 2. | "Make You" | 3:35 |
| 3. | "Stay with Me" | 3:55 |
| 4. | "Suddenly" | 3:22 |
| 5. | "Stop!" | 3:09 |
| 6. | "You Will Be Mine" | 4:06 |
| 7. | "Music, Dance" | 3:23 |
| 8. | "One More Chance" | 3:37 |
| 9. | "Clear Sign" | 3:27 |
| 10. | "I Miss You" | 2:56 |

== Charts ==
=== Weekly charts ===
Weekly chart performance for Strong
| Chart (2010) | Peak position |
|---|---|
| Russian Albums (2M) | 2 |

=== Year-end charts ===
Year-end chart performance for Strong
| Chart (2010) | Position |
|---|---|
| Russian Albums (2M) | 19 |

== Certifications ==
Certifications for Strong
| Region | Certification | Certified units/sales |
|---|---|---|
| Russia (NFPF) | Platinum | 9,380 |

== Release history ==
| Region | Date | Format | Edition | Label | Ref(s) |
|---|---|---|---|---|---|
| Russia | 11 February 2010 | CD; digital download | Standard; premium | CD Land | |
| Russia | 22 February 2011 | CD; digital download | Oriflame | CD Land | |
| Germany | 9 March 2012 | CD; digital download | Standard | White Shell Music | |
