= Different (Thomas Anders album) =

- Cover photography by Peter Ashworth

Studio album by Thomas Anders
- Released: 29 August 1989
- Recorded: 1987–1989
- Studios: Sound Studio N in Germany and Alan Parson's studio in London, United Kingdom
- Genres: Pop, pop rock
- Length: 48:02 (LP); 57:06 (CD)
- Labels: Teldec, East West, Time Warner
- Producers: Gus Dudgeon, Alan Tarney, Marc Cassandra

Thomas Anders chronology
Different (1989)	Whispers (1991)

Singles from Different
- 1. "Love of My Own" Released: 26 April 1989; 2. "One Thing" Released: 1989; 3. "Soldier" Released: 27 October 1989

Different is the debut solo album by German singer Thomas Anders, who first attained success as the lead vocalist for Modern Talking in the mid-1980s. It was released in August 1989 by Teldec Records. The album was recorded in London at Alan Parsons' studio and was produced by Gus Dudgeon (Elton John) & Alan Tarney (a-ha). It features a cover of Chris Rea's Fool (If You Think It's Over). The album was re-released in 1991 by East West Records on CD.

Although the album's lead single, "Love of My Own", managed to peak at No. 24 in Germany, the album, including two more singles, "One Thing" and "Soldier", did not chart.

== Track listing ==
1. "Love Of My Own" (Marc Cassandra, Chris Venis, Timothy Touchton) — 4:52
2. "On My Way" (Vitale) — 5:54
3. "Turn On The Light" (Bob) — 4:16
4. "Living On The Edge" (*) (Alan Tarney) — 4:45
5. "You Are My Life" (**) (Marc Cassandra, Chris Venis, Heisig, Mary S. Applegate) — 4:44
6. "One Thing" (**) (Thomas Anders, Marc Cassandra, Mary S. Applegate) — 3:57
7. "Soldier" (*) (Alan Tarney) — 4:37
8. "Someone New" (*) (Alan Tarney) — 4:51
9. "Close Your Eyes To Heaven" (**) (Thomas Anders, Marc Cassandra, Mary S. Applegate) — 5:06
10. "Fool (If You Think It's Over)" (Chris Rea) — 5:41
11. "True Love" (Thomas Anders, Marc Cassandra, Mary S. Applegate) — 4:30
12. "You Are My Life (Classical Mix)" (**) (Marc Cassandra, Chris Venis/Heisig, Mary S. Applegate) — 4:44

=== Alternative track listing ===
The title of the first solo-album was supposed to be Fool If You Think It's Over with track-listing as follows:

1. "Love Of My Own (LP-Version)"
2. "True Love"
3. "One Thing (LP-Version)"
4. "You Are My Life"
5. "Soldier"
6. "Close Your Eyes To Heaven"
7. "Fool If You Think It's Over"
8. "Light For Love"
9. "I'm On My Way"
10. "Time To Touch"
11. "I'm On The Edge"
12. "That Someone (Someone New)"
13. "You Are My Life (Classical Mix)"
14. "One Thing (12" Maxi-Mix)"

== Personnel ==
- Ian Lynn, Marc Cassandra – keyboards, programming
- Thomas Anders – Fender Rhodes piano, vocals
- Phil Palmer, Reinhard Besser – guitar
- Martin Jenner – acoustic guitar
- Jeremy Meeks – bass
- Jeremy Stacey – drums
- Frank Ricotti – percussion
- Pete Zorn – saxophone
- Gürzenich Orchestra – strings
- Ian Lynn, Andy Brown & Pete Zorn, Thomas Anders, Sabine van Baaren, Marc Cassandra – backing vocals

=== Technical personnel ===
- Produced by Gus Dudgeon (A member of The British Producers Guild)
- Arranged by Ian Lynn, Gus Dudgeon & Marc Cassandra
- Digitally Engineered & Mixed by Tony Richards & Gus Dudgeon at the Grange, Benenden, Kent/England
- Edited at The Town House, London/England by Gordon Vicary
- (*) Produced & arranged by Alan Tarney
- Recorded at RG Jones Studio, London/England
- (**) Produced by Thomas Anders & Marc Cassandra
- Recorded at Sound Studio N. Cologne/West Germany, by Gunter Kasper
- Mixed at Wisseloord Studios, Hilversum/Netherlands, by Ronald Prent
- Mixed by Bert Bevans, Remix Engineer Ian Grimble at Livingston Studio, London/England
- Photos by Peter Ashworth
- Art Direction and design: Mainartery, London

== Release history ==
- 1989 Germany: Teldec Records Service GmbH 246 187-1 & 4 (LP and MC), 246 188-2 (CD)
- 1989 France: East West Records/A Time Warner Company WE 481 (CD), (LP) & (Cassette)
- 1989 Taiwan: UFO Group WU 1475 (LP) & (Cassette)
- 1989 (1991, 1998) Germany: East West Records GmbH 2292-46188-2 (CD), (LP) & (Cassette)
- 1998 Russia: Soyuz Music 2292-46188-4 (Cassette)

== Music videos ==
- Love Of My Own and One Thing were released on Thomas Anders - The DVD-Collection. Soldier was released on its own as a music video.
