= Es war die Nacht der ersten Liebe =

Single by Thomas Anders

Single by Thomas Anders
- B-side: "Mädchen So Wie Du"
- Released: 1981 (Germany)
- Recorded: 1981
- Genre: Schlager
- Length: 4:17
- Label: CBS
- Songwriters: Daniel David; Norbert Hammerschmidt
- Producer: Daniel David

Thomas Anders singles chronology
"Du Weinst Um Ihn" (1980)	"Es war die Nacht der ersten Liebe" (1981)	"Ich Will Nicht Dein Leben" (1982)

Es war die Nacht der ersten Liebe (English: It Was The Night of The First Love) is a German ballad by singer Thomas Anders. It was Thomas Anders' third single, released in 1981.

== Track listing ==
CBS A 1549 7"

1. "Es War Die Nacht Der Ersten Liebe" (Daniel David/Daniele Prencipe/Jean Frankfurter) - 4:17
2. "Mädchen So Wie Du" (Daniel David/Daniele Prencipe/Renus Gern) - 3:52
