= This Time (Thomas Anders album) =

Studio album by Thomas Anders
- Released: 23 February 2004
- Length: 47:23
- Label: Na Klar!; BMG

Thomas Anders chronology
Live Concert (1997)	This Time (2004)	Songs Forever (2006)

This Time is the eighth studio album by German singer Thomas Anders. It was released by Na Klar! and BMG on 23 February 2004. His first solo album after six years of hiatus, it peaked at number 14 on the German Albums Chart. The album is Anders' 19th album, other releases included.

== Track listing ==
All tracks co-produced by Thomas Anders.

No.	Title	Writer(s)	Producer(s)	Length
1.	"King of Love"	Matthias Hass; Maren Stiebert; K. Kama	Sebastian da Silva; Alonzo da Silva	3:34
2.	"Independent Girl"	Benjamin Boyce; Jany Scheller; Andreas Babren	Peter Ries	3:41
3.	"Tonight Is The Night"	Martin Warnke; Ralph Suda	Warnke; Suda	3:43
4.	"Live Your Dream"	Sven "Delgado" Jordan; Alex Trime	Sven	3:42
5.	"Nothings Gonna Stop Me Now"	Warnke; Suda	Warnke; Suda	3:36
6.	"Playing With Dynamite"	Martin Frainer; Petra Bonmassar; Ina Wolf	Sven	3:12
7.	"Every Little Thing"	Bonmassar; Frainer; Wolf	Ries; Dirk Kurock	3:40
8.	"World of Stars"	Jock-E; Tucker; Savan Kotecha	Ries	3:37
9.	"Night to Remember"	Axel Breitung; Michael Kronenberger; Steffen Harning	Breitung	3:18
10.	"This Time"	Frederik Bjork; Per Eklund; Tony Malm	Ries	3:22
11.	"In Your Eyes"	Anders; Ries	Ries	4:30
12.	"How Deep Is Your Love"	Carsten Wegener	Carsten Wegener; Timo Hohnholz	3:32
13.	"Paradise"	Philippe Moritz	Ries	4:01

== Personnel and credits ==
Adapted from album booklet.

- Thomas Anders – co-producer, executive producer
- Tom Appl – mixing
- Axel Breitung – producer
- Timo Hohnholz – producer
- Alonzo da Silva – producer
- Sebastian da Silva – producer
- Peter Ries – mixing, producer
- Ralph Suda – arranger, producer
- Sven – producer
- Martin Warnke – arranger, producer
- Carten Wegener – producer

== Charts ==
Chart (2004)	Peak position
German Albums (Offizielle Top 100)	14
