= Whispers (Thomas Anders album) =

Studio album by Thomas Anders
- Released: 17 May 1991
- Recorded: 1990–1991
- Genres: Pop, pop rock
- Label: East West
- Producers: Paul Muggleton, Mike Paxman

Thomas Anders chronology
| Different (1989) | Whispers (1991) | Down on Sunset (1992) |

Singles from Whispers
- 1. "The Sweet Hello, the Sad Goodbye" Released: April 1991; 2. "Can't Give You Anything (But My Love)" Released: July 1991; 3. "True Love" Released: November 1991

Whispers is the second studio album by German singer Thomas Anders, released in 1991. It was produced by Paul Muggleton and Mike Paxman (Nick Kamen) and mixed by Stephen W Tayler. Some tracks for the album were provided by songwriters of Roxette (Per Gessle) and Jennifer Rush (Candy DeRouge). It features a remake of The Stylistics' classic "Can't Give You Anything (But My Love)". Backing vocals were provided by Judie Tzuke and Don Snow (ex-Squeeze).

== Track listing ==
1. "The Sweet Hello, the Sad Goodbye" (Per Gessle) – 4:36
2. "Whispers of Love" (Thomas Anders, Müller, Christ, Zimmermann) – 5:08
3. "The Echo of My Heart" (Candy DeRouge, Peter Ries) – 4:30
4. "Maybe I'm Dreaming" (Thomas Anders, Marc Cassandra) – 4:25
5. "For All That We Know" (Mike Paxman, Paul Muggleton) – 4:07
6. "Can't Give You Anything (But My Love)" (George David Weiss) (*) – 4:19
7. "For Your Love" (Matthias Schmidt, Ernst Luksch) – 4:41
8. "True Love" (Candy DeRouge) – 4:47
9. "Don't Say You Love Me" (Cassandra, Ball) – 4:42
10. "Hungry Hearts" (Candy DeRouge) – 4:09

== Personnel ==
- Music performed by Mike Paxman, Paul Muggleton, Bob Noble, Don Snow
- Backing vocals: Judie Tzuke, Paul Muggleton, Don Snow, Deborah Robson
- Featuring vocals by Judie Tzuke

Production

- Recorded and produced by Mike Paxman and Paul Muggleton for Big Ocean Productions
- Mixed by Stephen W Tayler at Metropolis, London, except:
  - (*) Mixed by Mark "Tufte" Evans
- Art direction and design: Mainartery, London
- Photos by Paul Cox

== Music videos ==
- "Can't Give You Anything (But My Love)" was released on its own as a music video.

== Release history ==
- 1991 Germany: East West Records GmbH 9031-74628-2 (CD), (LP) & (Cassette)
- 1991 France: East West Records/A Time Warner Company WE 833 (CD), (LP) & (Cassette)
- 1991 South Africa: Artone CTNT 5037 (CD) & (LP)
- 1991 Taiwan: UFO Group WU 1665 (LP) & (Cassette)
- 1991 South Korea: SKC (CD) & (LP)

== See also ==
- Judie Tzuke – Left Hand Talking (1991)
