= Soy Yo (Marta Sánchez album) =

Studio album by Marta Sánchez
- Released: July 16, 2002
- Genre: Latin Pop
- Label: Muxxic Latina

Marta Sánchez chronology
Grandes Éxitos: Los Mejores Años de Nuestra Vida (2001)	Soy Yo (2002)	Lo Mejor de Marta Sánchez (2004)

Soy Yo (Eng.: It's Me) is the fifth studio album by Spanish singer Marta Sánchez. It was released on July 16, 2002 and achieved gold status in Spain in the first week of sales. It was recorded in Madrid, Spain, London, UK and Los Angeles, CA. The first single in Spain was "Sigo Intentado" a ballad written by the singer and dedicated to her sister. In Mexico the first single was "Soy Yo", a dance song written by Paul Berry and Mark Taylor with a translation by the singer herself. The album was produced by Carl James, Gary Miller, Carlo Nasi, Brian Rawling and Christian De Walden.

== Track listing ==
#	Title	composition	Duration
1	"Sigo intentando"	Marta Sánchez	3:59
2	"Soy Yo"	Mark Taylor/Paul Barry/Adaptación: Marta Sánchez	3:56
3	"En tus brazos"	Alberto Mastofrancesco/Vito Mastofrancesco/Carlos Toro	3:52
4	"Amor cobarde"	Alberto Mastofrancesco/Vito Mastofrancesco/Carlos Toro	4:05
5	"Noche tras día"	Carl James/Marta Sánchez	3:53
6	"Como un ángel"	Stephanie Bentley/Rob Crosby/Adaptación: Marta Sánchez	4:15
7	"Socorro"	Marivana Viscuso	3:59
8	"Encontrándote"	Steve Singer/Claudia Brant	3:30
9	"Si crees en mí"	Michelle Rowe/Frank Fossey/Juan Carlos Melián	3:51
10	"No te quiero más"	Marivana Viscuso	4:12
11	"Secretos"	Julio Fowler	4:09
12	"Tal vez fuiste tú"	Steve Singer/Dennis Clark/Carlos Toro	4:10
13	"El país de nunca jamás"	Carl James/Marta Sánchez/Carlos Toro	4:57

== Certifications and sales ==
Region	Certification	Certified units/sales
Spain (PROMUSICAE)	Platinum	100,000^{^}
^{^} Shipments figures based on certification alone.
