= Ich will nicht dein Leben =

Single by Thomas Anders
- B-side: "Ich Hatte Mal Freunde"
- Released: July 1982
- Recorded: 1982
- Genre: Schlager
- Length: 3:38
- Label: Hansa
- Songwriter(s): Axel Breitung; Michael Kunze; Uwe Busse
- Producer(s): Bernd Dietrich

Thomas Anders singles chronology
"Es War Die Nacht Der Ersten Liebe" (1981)	"Ich will nicht dein Leben" (1982)	"Was Macht Das Schon" (1983)

"Ich will nicht dein Leben" (English: I Don't Want Your Life) is a German schlager song by singer Thomas Anders. It was Anders' fourth single.

== Track listing ==
Hansa 104 591-100 7"

1. "Ich Will Nicht Dein Leben" (Axel Breitung / Michael Kunze / Uwe Busse) - 3:38
2. "Ich Hatte Mal Freunde" (Axel Breitung / René Marcard / Uwe Busse) - 3:37
