= Souled =

Studio album by Thomas Anders
- Released: 7 April 1995
- Recorded: May–November 1994
- Studios: The Embassy in Los Angeles, California, United States
- Genres: Soul, blue-eyed soul, R&B, new jack swing
- Length: 49:01
- Label: Polydor 523 865-2
- Producer: Peter Wolf

Thomas Anders chronology
Barcos De Cristal (1994)	Souled (1995)	Live Concert (1997)

Singles from Souled
- 1. "Road to Higher Love" Released: 31 October 1994; 2. "Never Knew Love Like This Before" Released: 10 March 1995; 3. "A Little Bit of Lovin' (Summer Mix)" Released: 1995

Souled is the sixth studio album by singer-songwriter Thomas Anders. It was released in April 1995, and was produced by Peter Wolf, who had previously worked with Starship. The album featured covers of The Beatles' "Michelle", Stephanie Mills' "Never Knew Love Like This Before" and a duet with The Pointer Sisters on "Feel for the Physical". "Road To Higher Love", "A Little Bit Of Lovin'" and "Never Knew Love Like This Before" were released as singles.

== Overview ==
After his lackluster success in pop music, Anders decided to experiment with new styles of music, which culminated in the 1994 release of Barcos De Cristal, a Latin-style album which was recorded entirely in Spanish. Although Barcos De Cristal was not successful in its native country, it was a commercial success in Argentina. Anders decided to focus on soul music for his next album. While working in the United States, Anders met producer Peter Wolf, who would produce his next solo album, Souled. Recording took place between May and November 1994. The album was released in April 1995 by Polydor Records, but like its predecessor, Barcos De Cristal, it was met with very little success in its home country, failing to chart in Germany.

== Singles ==
The first single, "Road to Higher Love" was released in fall 1994, and even had a music video made. The next single is a cover version of Stephanie Mills' "Never Knew Love Like This Before". The third and final single to be released from the album was a remix of "A Little Bit of Lovin'".

== Track listing ==
1. "Souled In" (Featuring Lynn Davis) (Peter Wolf, Lynn Davis, Ina Wolf) – 0:21
2. "Michelle" (John Lennon, Paul McCartney) – 4:58
3. "Never Knew Love Like This Before" (James Mtume, Reggie Lucas) – 4:24
4. "Will You Let Me Know" (Peter Wolf, Thomas Anders, Ina Wolf) – 4:22
5. "The Heat Between the Girls and the Boys" (Peter Wolf, Thomas Anders, Ina Wolf) – 4:51
6. "Look at the Tears" (Peter Wolf, Thomas Anders, Ina Wolf) – 3:47
7. "Feel for the Physical" (Duet With The Pointer Sisters) (Peter Zizzo, Peter Wolf) – 4:32
8. "Carry You With Me" (Steve Plunkett, Mark Vogel) – 4:17
9. "Road to Higher Love" (Peter Wolf, Thomas Anders, Ina Wolf) – 4:08
10. "South of Love" (Peter Roberts, Peter Wolf, Ina Wolf) – 4:01
11. "A Little Bit of Lovin'" (Peter Wolf, Thomas Anders, Ina Wolf) – 3:56
12. "Point of No Return" (Peter Wolf, Thomas Anders, Ina Wolf) – 4:57
13. "Souled Out" (Featuring Lynn Davis) (Peter Wolf, Lynn Davis, Ina Wolf) – 0:38

== Personnel ==
- Produced and arranged by: Peter Wolf
- Associate producer: Paul Ericksen
- Recorded and mixed by Paul Ericksen at "The Embassy" in Los Angeles, CA
- Additional recording by David Jahnsen
- Mixing Assistant: Rejean DeGrandMaison
- Additional Studios: "Front Page Recorders" in Los Angeles, CA
- Mastered by Steven Marcussen at "Precision Mastering" in Los Angeles, CA
- Artwork by Grafiksalon
- Photos by Gerhard Hirsch

== Musicians ==
- David Williams, Jeff Richman, Bruce Gaitsch, Peter Roberts - guitar
- Tony Braunagel - drums
- Sean Thomas - rap
- Thomas Anders, Phillip Ingram, Anita, June and Ruth Pointer, Alex Brown, Lynn Davis, Ina Wolf - backing vocals
- Peter Wolf - all other instruments

== Release details ==
- 1995 - Polydor CD: 523 865-2

== Music videos ==
- "Road To Higher Love" was released as a music video and featured on Thomas Anders – The DVD-Collection.

== See also ==
- The Pointer Sisters – Only Sisters Can Do That (1993)
