= Du weinst um ihn =

Single by Thomas Anders
- B-side: "Einer Von Uns Beiden"
- Released: 1980 (Germany)
- Recorded: 1980
- Genre: Schlager
- Length: 3:57
- Label: CBS
- Songwriter(s): Daniel David; Norbert Hammerschmidt
- Producer(s): Rudolf Zawrel

Thomas Anders singles chronology
"Judy" (1980)	"Du weinst um ihn" (1980)	"Es War Die Nacht Der Ersten Liebe" (1981)

Du weinst um ihn (English: You Cry for Him) is a German ballad by singer Thomas Anders. It was his second single.

== Track listing ==
CBS S 9482 7"

1. "Du Weinst Um Ihn" (Daniel David/Norbert Hammerschmidt) - 3:57
2. "Einer Von Uns Beiden" (Anders Glenmark/Bo Maniette/Norbert Hammerschmidt) - 4:56
