= You Can Win If You Want =

1985 single by Modern Talking

Single by Modern Talking

from the album The 1st Album
- Released: 13 March 1985
- Recorded: October 1984
- Genre: Eurodisco
- Length: 3:55
- Label: Hansa
- Songwriter(s): Dieter Bohlen
- Producer(s): Dieter Bohlen; Luis Rodríguez

Modern Talking singles chronology
"You're My Heart, You're My Soul" (1984)	"You Can Win If You Want" (1985)	"Cheri, Cheri Lady" (1985)

Audio video
- "You Can Win If You Want" on YouTube

"You Can Win If You Want" is a song by German pop duo Modern Talking, released as the second and final single from their debut studio album, The 1st Album (1985). The single was released on 13 March 1985 and entered the top 10 in Germany on 13 May 1985. After spending three weeks within the top five, the single reached the top spot, eventually going gold for sales in excess of 250,000 units in West Germany alone. The single peaked at number eight in France, where it also reached a gold status for sales of 500,000 units.

The video for the song was shot at Bavaria Studios in Munich and directed by Michael Bentele.

== Track listings ==
- 7-inch single
1. "You Can Win If You Want" (Special Single Remix) – 3:44
2. "One in a Million" – 3:42
- 12-inch maxi single
1. "You Can Win If You Want" (Special Dance Version) – 5:19
2. "You Can Win If You Want" (Instrumental) – 3:43
3. "One in a Million" – 3:42

== Charts ==
=== Weekly charts ===
Weekly chart performance for "You Can Win If You Want"
Chart (1985)	Peak position
Austria (Ö3 Austria Top 40)	1
Belgium (Ultratop 50 Flanders)	2
Denmark (IFPI)	2
Europe (European Top 100 Singles)	12
Finland (Suomen virallinen lista)	16
France (SNEP)	8
Netherlands (Dutch Top 40)	6
Netherlands (Single Top 100)	7
Portugal (AFP)	2
South Africa (Springbok Radio)	10
Spain (AFYVE)	2
Switzerland (Schweizer Hitparade)	2
UK Singles (OCC)	70
West Germany (GfK)	1

=== Year-end charts ===
Year-end chart performance for "You Can Win If You Want"
Chart (1985)	Position
Austria (Ö3 Austria Top 40)	8
Belgium (Ultratop 50 Flanders)	3
Netherlands (Dutch Top 40)	26
Netherlands (Single Top 100)	38
Switzerland (Schweizer Hitparade)	11
West Germany (Official German Charts)	10

== Certifications ==
Certifications for "You Can Win If You Want"
Region	Certification	Certified units/sales
France (SNEP)	Gold	500,000^{*}
Germany (BVMI)	Gold	500,000^{^}
^{*} Sales figures based on certification alone.^{^} Shipments figures based on certification alone.
