= Ralf Stemmann =

German musical artist

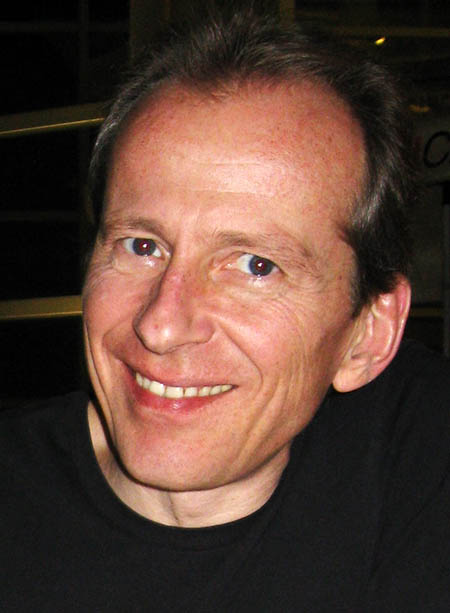

Background information
- Origin: Germany
- Genres: Pop
- Occupations: Record producer, composer, arranger, remixer
- Instruments: Keyboards, Programming
- Years active: 1980-2017
- Website: MySpace.com

Ralf Stemmann (21 June 1958 – 7 August 2017) was a German-born record producer, composer, remixer, keyboard player, and synthesizer programmer. Global record sales of productions he has been involved in as a composer, producer, and arranger exceed 150 million units. He earned Latin Grammy nominations for his work with Paulina Rubio (“Yo No Soy Esa Mujer”, Best Music Video, as a composer) and Luz Rios (“Aire”, Best New Artist and Best Female Pop Vocal Album, as producer). He also won the 20th Annual USA Songwriting Competition in the Latin category with the song "Enamorados" with Luz Rios in 2014.

== Biography ==
Ralf Stemmann was born in Germany. Ralf had degrees in Mathematics and Natural Science from Albert-Einstein-Gymnasium in Nordheide, Germany. He also received a broad classical piano instruction from 1965 to 1981. While residing in Germany Ralf Stemmann worked as an arranger, studio and live-keyboard player and teacher.

Later, he learned comprehensive studio techniques in engineering, arranging, synthesizer programming, and sound design at Studio 33 (formerly Star Studio) together with Spanish producer Luis Rodriguez. He also instructed adults and children in piano, organ, and harmony theory at the private music school of Frank Valdor. He lived and worked in Hamburg, Berlin, London, Miami, and Los Angeles, allowing him to collaborate with a diverse array of artists and earn many awards. He died on August 7, 2017, in Malibu, California.

=== Professional career ===
Stemmann started his music career in the early 80s with Schampus, with the project "Phantom In Rom" for the label Night’n’Day Records where he collaborated with Mike Mareen. In the mid 1980s, Stemmann worked as a studio engineer and sound designer at Studio 33 with Modern Talking, being co-arranger together with Luis Rodríguez.

His credits as a producer, composer, arranger and keyboard player include collaborations with: Modern Talking, Chris Norman, C.C. Catch, Blue System, Engelbert Humperdinck, London Boys, Nino de Angelo, London Royal Philharmonic Orchestra, Baccara, Marianne Rosenberg, Roberto Blanco, Howard Carpendale, Mary Roos, Bonnie Bianco, Ricky Shayne, Audrey Landers, Jason Everly, Paul Bennett, The Three Degrees, Michael Holm, Denyce Graves, Thelma Houston, Trini Lopez, Smokie, The Tremeloes, Thomas Anders and many others.

Ralf also composed, produced, and arranged music for films, TV, and videos including ZDF-Hitparade and several episodes of the TV crime show Tatort, The Old Fox and TV series such as Rivalen der Rennbahn, videos for Sportschau, themes for the PBS Kids series The Huggabug Club, themes for the Buscando Estrellas series from 1992-1993 as well as Supermodels of the World, International Auto-Show Detroit and others. He worked on the scores for the animated TV series History of Mexico and for the movies The Pearl and Ring of the Musketeers.

After moving to the USA, he worked as composer, producer, arranger of Latin stars including Ricky Martin, Thalia, Paulina Rubio, Marta Sanchez, Luz Rios, Paloma San Basilio, Martin Nievera, Cusco, Sarah Geronimo, Pablo Ruiz.

== Awards ==
Year	Nominee / work	Award	Result	
			Credits	
1989	"Rivalen der Rennbahn" (soundtrack album)	BMG Ariola / Hansa (Germany) Gold Album	Arranger	Won
1990	"Twilight" - Blue System	BMG Ariola / Hansa (Germany) Gold Album	Arranger	Won
1994	"Mujer" - Marta Sanchez	Polygram Iberica (Spain) Gold Album	Arranger, producer, composer	Won
1994	"Love Is The Answer" - Teri Ann Linn	Fazer Music / Warner (Philippines) Gold Album	Arranger, producer, composer	Won
1995-2000	"The Huggabug Club" (educational TV series for kids)	The Parents Choice Award, The Dove Foundation Award, The Kids First! Award, The Media Access Award	Arranger, producer, composer	Won
2003	"Yo No Soy Esa Mujer" - Paulina Rubio	BMI Latin Award	Composer	Won
2006	"Becoming" - Sarah Geronimo	ASAP (Philippines) Pop Viewer's Choice Awards: Pop Album of the Year	Arranger, composer	Won
2006	"I Still Believe In Loving You" - Sarah Geronimo	ASAP (Philippines) Pop Viewer's Choice Awards: Pop Song of the Year	Arranger, composer	Won
2007	"Dream On" - Mark Bautista	VIVA Entertainment (Philippines) Gold Album	Arranger, composer	Won
2007	"Becoming" - Sarah Geronimo	VIVA Entertainment(Philippines) Platinum Album	Arranger, composer	Won
2009	"Music And Me" - Sarah Geronimo	VIVA Entertainment(Philippines) Platinum Album	Arranger	Won
2009	"I'll Be The One" - Mark Bautista	VIVA Entertainment(Philippines) Platinum Album	Arranger, composer	Won
2009	"Your Christmas Girl" - Sarah Geronimo	VIVA Entertainment(Philippines) Platinum Album	Arranger	Won
2014	"Enamorados" - Luz Rios	20th Annual USA Songwriting Competition	Arranger, producer, composer	Won
