= Thomas Anders =

German pop singer and songwriter (born 1963)

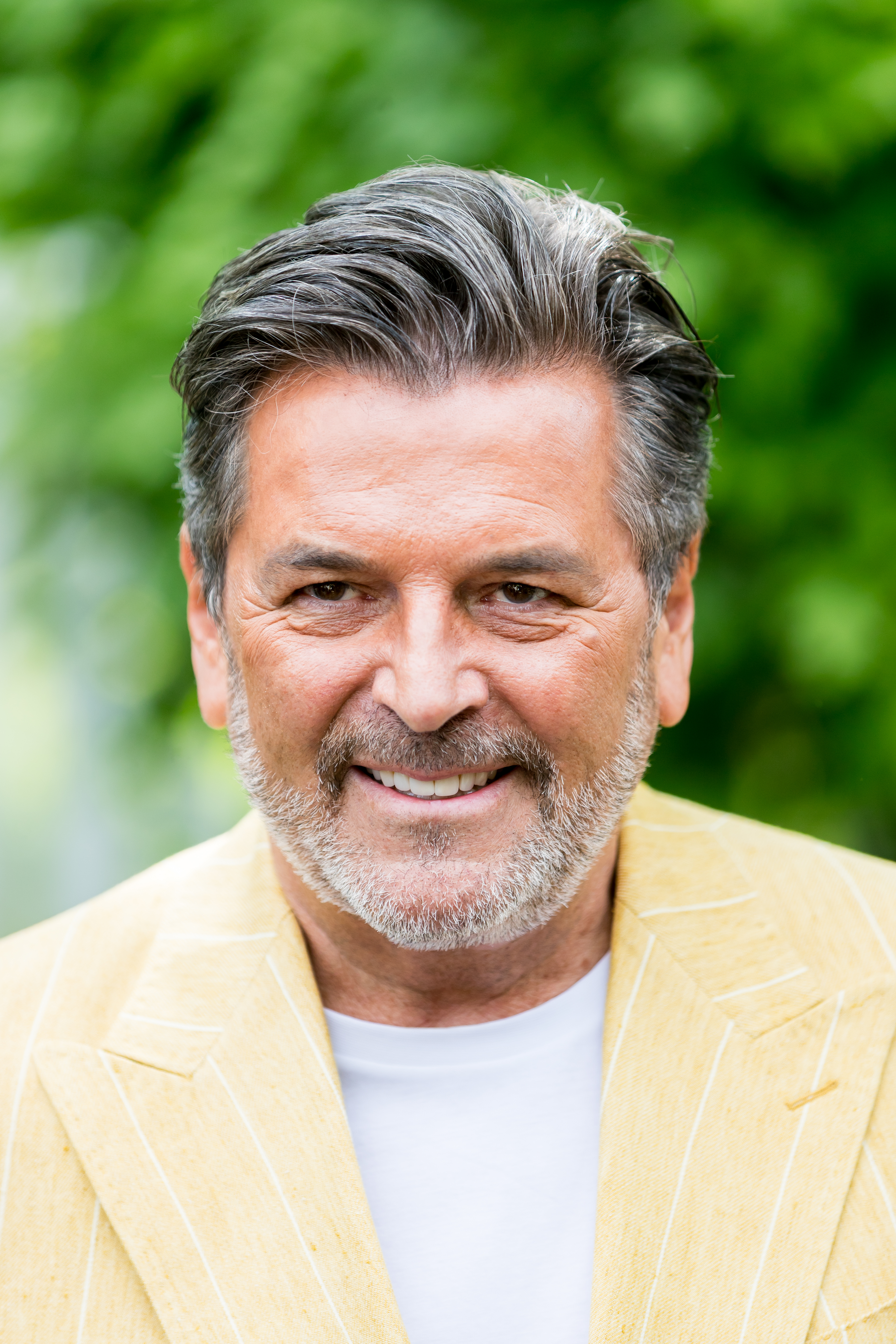
- Anders in 2025

Background information
- Born: Bernd Weidung; 1 March 1963 (age 63); Koblenz, West Germany
- Genres: Europop; Eurodance; Euro disco; dance-pop; house; schlager
- Occupations: Singer; songwriter; record producer
- Instruments: Vocals; piano
- Years active: 1980–present
- Labels: Teldec; East West; Polydor; BMG; Edel
- Formerly of: Modern Talking
- Spouses: Nora Balling (m. 1984; div. 1999) Claudia Weidung-Anders (m. 2000)
- Website: thomas-anders.com

Thomas Anders (German pronunciation: [ˈtoːmas ˈandɐs], born Bernd Weidung (German pronunciation: [ˈbɛʁnt ˈvaɪ̯dʊŋ]); 1 March 1963) is a German singer, songwriter and record producer. He is best known as the vocalist of the former pop duo Modern Talking.

Starting his singing career while still in school, Anders unsuccessfully attempted to establish himself as a Schlager artist for several years. After forming the Eurodisco duo Modern Talking with Dieter Bohlen in 1983, they became a worldwide sensation with their hit "You're My Heart, You're My Soul". They followed up with a string of other hits, namely "You Can Win If You Want", "Cheri, Cheri Lady", "Brother Louie", "Atlantis Is Calling (S.O.S. for Love)", "Geronimo's Cadillac", and "Jet Airliner", before dissolving in 1987. In 1998, they reunited and produced several new songs such as "You Are Not Alone", "Sexy, Sexy Lover", "No Face, No Name, No Number", "Ready for the Victory", and "TV Makes the Superstar", before dissolving again in 2003. Their controversial break-ups led to several lawsuits and heavy coverage from the German tabloid press. During their two stints together, the duo sold 120 million records worldwide and received numerous sales certifications around the globe.

After the two break-ups of Modern Talking, Anders performed as a solo artist during the 1990s and after 2003. During the first Modern Talking split, he released six studio albums, none of which managed to chart, whereas some singles such as "Love of My Own" achieved mediocre success. Only his Spanish language album Barcos de Cristal (1994) proved successful in Argentina, where its eponymous title track climbed to number 1. Following the second break-up, Anders started a more successful solo career, with his album This Time (2004) reaching number 14 in Germany and producing number 1 hits in Russia and Turkey. His 2010 album Strong reached Platinum status in Russia for sales of more than 650,000 copies. Two (2010), a collaboration album with Jörn-Uwe Fahrenkrog-Petersen reached number 11 in Germany, while his first German language album Pures Leben (2017) climbed at number 14.

While being unable to match his success with Modern Talking with his solo career, Anders is considered a musical icon in Eastern Europe, where he is more revered than in his native country and regularly performs stadium tours and on New Year's Eve in Poland. In 2006, the Taras Shevchenko National University of Kyiv made him an honorary professor for "shaping the musical taste of a generation", and he holds the distinction for being the best-selling foreign artist of all time in Russia.

== Early life ==
Anders was born in Koblenz, West Germany and grew up in the small village of Mörz, a suburb of Münstermaifeld, with an older brother and a younger sister. His father worked as a civil servant at the local revenue service agency, while his mother ran a convenience store. He began showing interest in music early as a child, and subsequently took piano and singing lessons. He did his first stage-performance at the age of six, playing Saint Nicholas in a religious children's play. At the age of ten, he entered a singing contest and won against 100 other children. As a prize, he performed over 300 times at a local music hall in Koblenz, offering a variety of children's songs and Schlager music. During his childhood, he performed as "Bernie von der Mosel".

Anders attended Kurfürst-Balduin-Gymnasium in Münstermaifeld. He finished his 'Abitur' in 1982 at Eichendorff-Gymnasium in Koblenz, to take advanced music classes. After that, he studied musicology, publishing and German studies for five semesters at Johannes Gutenberg University in Mainz, with the intention to become a music journalist, while also trying to become a singer. However, after getting his big break as the lead singer of Modern Talking, he dropped out to focus on his career.

== Career ==
=== 1978–1983: Early career and attempts at German Schlager ===
Following a string of performances at several clubs and discothèques, Anders participated in a music contest organized by the radio station Radio Luxembourg in 1979, which he walked away from without earning enough points. Two days after the contest, Anders was offered a record contract by the same jury members of the radio contest. He signed his first record contract with CBS while still in school and took up the stage name of Thomas Anders, performing in the then-popular German Schlager genre. In 1980, at the age of 17, he published his first single, Schlager ballad "Judy", which failed to chart. A year later, he appeared in German TV show Hätten Sie heut' Zeit für mich? and performed his second single, "Du weinst um ihn", another Schlager ballad. Again, the song failed to make an impact, as did his third single, "Es war die Nacht der ersten Liebe", an attempt at an upbeat Schlager song. Consequently, he was released by CBS in late 1981.

After finishing school, Anders signed a contract with Hansa Records in 1982. He next released another commercially unsuccessful Schlager ballad, "Ich will nicht dein Leben", produced by fellow Schlager artist G.G. Anderson.

In 1983, he was approached by Intersong, a subsidiary of Hansa, whether he was interested to record several German Schlager cover versions of English songs. Thus, he was introduced to producer Dieter Bohlen, with whom he recorded "Was macht das schon?", the German cover version of F. R. David's "Pick Up the Phone" and also "Heißkalter Engel", the German cover version of Real Life's "Send Me an Angel". From late 1983 to the mid of 1984 Bohlen produced other tracks for Anders including "Wovon träumst du denn", "Endstation Sehnsucht" and "Es geht mir gut heut' Nacht", which he performed at German TV shows such as Night Club. As was the case with his previous attempts at Schlager music, however; all of these songs failed to achieve commercial or critical success.

=== 1983–1987: Breakthrough and worldwide success with Modern Talking ===
After both Bohlen and Anders had failed to achieve success in the Schlager genre, Bohlen pitched the idea of forming a Eurodisco duo consisting of Anders as lead singer and himself to BMG. The label agreed, however; they invested only little money in the project, resulting in low-budget videos and production. To capitalize on the popularity of the genre, they sang in easily accessible English lyrics, simple and catchy rhythms, and sported then-popular outfits. Modern Talking became an overnight sensation in 1985 when their video for "You're My Heart, You're My Soul", originally released in October of the previous year, was shown in popular German music show Formel Eins. After that, the song occupied top ten positions in thirty-five countries, including their homeland, where it remained perched at the top of the charts for six consecutive weeks. The single eventually went on to sell eight million copies worldwide, reaching number one in Austria, Belgium, Switzerland, as well as the European Hot 100. The track was then followed by another number-one hit in Germany and Austria, "You Can Win If You Want", which was released in the middle of 1985 from the debut album The 1st Album. "You Can Win If You Want" eventually went gold and sold well over 250,000 units in Germany alone. The single also peaked at No. 8 in France where it also reached a gold status for sales of 500,000 units The album was certified platinum in Germany for selling over 500,000 units. and reached the top ten in Belgium, the Netherlands, South Africa, Spain, and Switzerland.

Soon after their second hit, Modern Talking released the single "Cheri, Cheri Lady" which also quickly climbed to the top of the charts in Germany, Switzerland, Austria and Norway, meanwhile entering the top ten in Sweden and the Netherlands. The single, being the only track released from their second album Let's Talk About Love, managed to push the album to a platinum status in West Germany for sales of over 500,000, while the single itself went gold selling well over 250,000 units, as well as being certified silver in France for certified sales of 250,000 units. The success continued with two other number one singles, "Brother Louie" and "Atlantis Is Calling (S.O.S. for Love)" both from the third album Ready for Romance, giving them five consecutive number one hits in Germany. Both singles also had significant chart success worldwide. "Brother Louie" was their only hit in the UK, where it peaked at No. 4 in the charts and went silver for selling over 250,000 units. It was also certified silver in France for selling over 250,000 units. The song also reached number one in Spain, South Africa and Sweden. The duo also charted high with their sixth single "Geronimo's Cadillac" from the fourth album In the Middle of Nowhere and "Jet Airliner" from their fifth album Romantic Warriors. Both singles reached the German top ten but where especially successful in Spain, where they reached number one and three, respectively. However, neither their fifth, nor their sixth album In the Garden of Venus managed to sell well and the latter one's only single "In 100 Years..." only reached number 30 in Germany, while reaching number 4 in Spain. Furthermore, Modern Talking and Anders were especially successful in the Soviet Union, where they were one of the first Western bands allowed to sell their records and perform. During the 80s, the band sold over 60 million copies worldwide.

Due to their lacklusterly received sixth album, Bohlen terminated the project during an interview, while Anders was in Los Angeles. This sparked further animosity between the two, who had had a tumultuous and quarreling relationship even when they were together. According to Bohlen, the main reason for breaking up the group was Anders' then-wife Nora, who refused to have her husband interviewed by female reporters, and constantly demanded huge changes made to shows, videos or recordings, a fact that Anders later admitted in his biography. After a final phone call during which both men heavily insulted each other, they refused to speak with each other for over 10 years. During their break-up, the band released a string of licensed greatest hits albums.

=== 1987–1998: Lackluster solo career and switch to pop music ===
Following the break-up of Modern Talking, Anders and his wife emigrated to the United States, where they were unknown. He then embarked on a world tour, where he performed Modern Talking's hits, covering cities like Budapest, Ljubljana, Potsdam, Wrocław, Gdańsk, Hong Kong, Singapore, Taipei, Moscow, Viña del Mar and Sun City. After that, he returned to his solo career, which, however, could not match his success with Modern Talking. In 1989, he released his first studio album as a solo artist, Different. Produced by Gus Dudgeon and Alan Tarney, the pop album abandoned his previous Schlager and Eurodisco attempts, but failed to chart. Nonetheless, its lead single, "Love of My Own" peaked at number 24 in Germany. He recorded an alternative English title track for the animated TV series Ducktales by Disney in 1990. In 1991, he released his second studio album, Whispers, which also failed to chart. "Can't Give You Anything (But My Love)", a cover of the eponymous song by The Stylistics, managed to reach number 73 on the German singles charts. The follow-up album Down on Sunset, released in 1992, produced the single "How Deep is Your Love", which charted at number 71 in Germany, whereas the album again could not chart. Neither did his fourth album, 1993's When Will I See You Again. The release was helmed by a cover of the song of the same name, which also featured original artists The Three Degrees, and "I'll Love You Forever", which charted at numbers 31 and 79 in Germany, respectively.

After this later lack of success in pop music, Anders decided to experiment with new styles for his next releases and moved back to Koblenz. His fifth studio album Barcos de Cristal (1994), was recorded completely in Spanish. In 1995, he released Souled, a soul album featuring covers of The Beatles, Stephanie Mills, as well as original songs and a duet with The Pointer Sisters. The same year, he portrayed the pop star Ypsilon in the episode "Stockholm Marathon" of the police procedural series Kommissar Beck. His 1997 live album Live Concert featured a jazz band and consisted entirely of jazz covers. However, neither release was commercially successful. Also in 1997, he starred in the musical short film Phantomschmerz.

=== 1998–2003: Modern Talking reunion and return to worldwide success ===
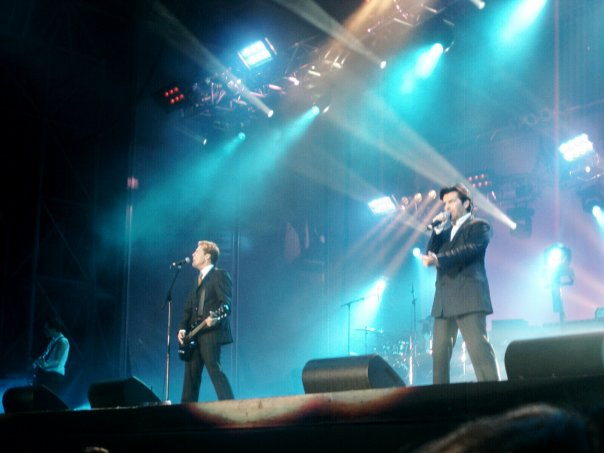
Anders (right) and Dieter Bohlen perform as Modern Talking in 2003.

Bohlen and Anders had both opposed the recording of a proper greatest hits album for years. In late 1997, Bohlen suggested the recording of a new album instead and contacted Anders, who had signed a contract with Ariola for an eventual comeback several years prior. Combining the idea of a greatest hits album and a new release, it was decided to rerecord and remix their previous songs while adding a few new ones. The rerecording switched their style from Euro disco to the 1990s Eurodance, incorporating techno and additional rap vocals by Eric Singleton. In early 1998, the duo officially reunited during popular TV show Wetten, dass..? and performed an updated version of "You're My Heart, You're My Soul" It entered the top 5 in number of countries including Germany, Switzerland, Austria, France, while entering the top 10 in many others including Sweden and Finland. In Germany, the single entered the top 10 on 6 April 1998, it peaked at number 2 the following week. After spending 10 weeks within the top 10, it eventually earned a platinum-award for selling over 500,000 units in Germany alone. In France, "You're My Heart, You're My Soul '98" peaked at no. 3 eventually earning a gold-award for selling over 250,000 units. "Brother Louie '98" was released in Germany and in other European territories on 20 July 1998. While, the single entered the top-20 in (Germany) and Austria, it managed to enter the top-10 in Sweden and the top-5 in France. In France, "Brother Louie '98" reached a gold status for selling over 250,000 units. The corresponding album Back For Good entered the number one position in Germany on 13 April 1998 and spent total of five weeks at the top, it eventually earned 5 gold-awards in Germany alone for selling over 1,250,000 units. Back for Good spent total of 54 weeks on the German album chart. Back for Good was also successful outside of Germany, topping the album charts of many other countries including Sweden, Finland, Norway, Switzerland and Austria. Back for Good eventually went on to sell over three million copies in Europe alone, and received various certifications in countries such as Spain, Norway, Latvia, Italy, or Belgium.

Their next albums were still highly successful, albeit not matching the success of Back for Good. In 2000, the album Alone, composed entirely of new songs, entered the German album chart at No. 1 on 8 March 1999 and spent four consecutive weeks at the top. After spending total of 27 weeks on the album chart, Alone eventually went platinum, shipping more than 500,000 units in Germany. Furthermore, the album was certified platinum in Poland, Sweden and Switzerland, while going gold in Spain, Finland and Austria. The singles "Sexy, Sexy Lover" and "You Are Not Alone" were able to enter the top ten and even top five in various European countries. Coinciding with the Chinese calendar, their ninth studio album was titled Year of the Dragon, being certified platinum in Germany. The lead single "China in Her Eyes" reached number eight in Germany, while going as high as number 6 in Spain. A second song, "No Face, No Name, No Number" proved to be highly popular in Romania and Moldavia, where it reached number 1.

Their 2001 effort, America, failed to achieve a certification, but produced the hit single "Win the Race", which became the anthem for Formula One in Germany for the 2001 series. The single peaked at No. 5 in Germany on 26 March 2001, exactly one month after its release. With their two final albums, Victory (2002) and Universe (2003), the band reached gold status in Germany. The singles "Ready for the Victory" and "TV Makes the Superstar" managed to peak at number 7 and 2, respectively.

Aside from performing with Modern Talking, Anders was also active as a producer and songwriter. For German Big Brother candidates Jürgen Milski and Zlatko Trpkovski, he co-wrote "Großer Bruder", which managed to stay at number 1 in Germany for 8 weeks and achieve platinum by selling 800.000 records. Furthermore, he produced girl group The It-Girls with "My Heart It Feels Like (Dub Dub…)" and wrote "Cry for You" for No Angels.

In 2003, Modern Talking dissolved again, again in controversial fashion. After a serious altercation before a concert in Rostock, Bohlen announced the end of the band live on stage, to the shock of Anders and the public. In his 2003 book Hinter den Kulissen, Bohlen further marginalized Anders' input to their music and accused him of stealing money from him. Anders subsequently sued Bohlen for libel and succeeded in having certain passages removed, but lost the lawsuit for compensation in 2005. In his 2011 book 100% Anders, he called the way Bohlen broke the band up and his antics "pathetic", and blamed him for breaking up the duo. Their final release, The Final Album, a greatest hits album, was released in August 2003.

=== 2003–2017: Success as a solo artist ===
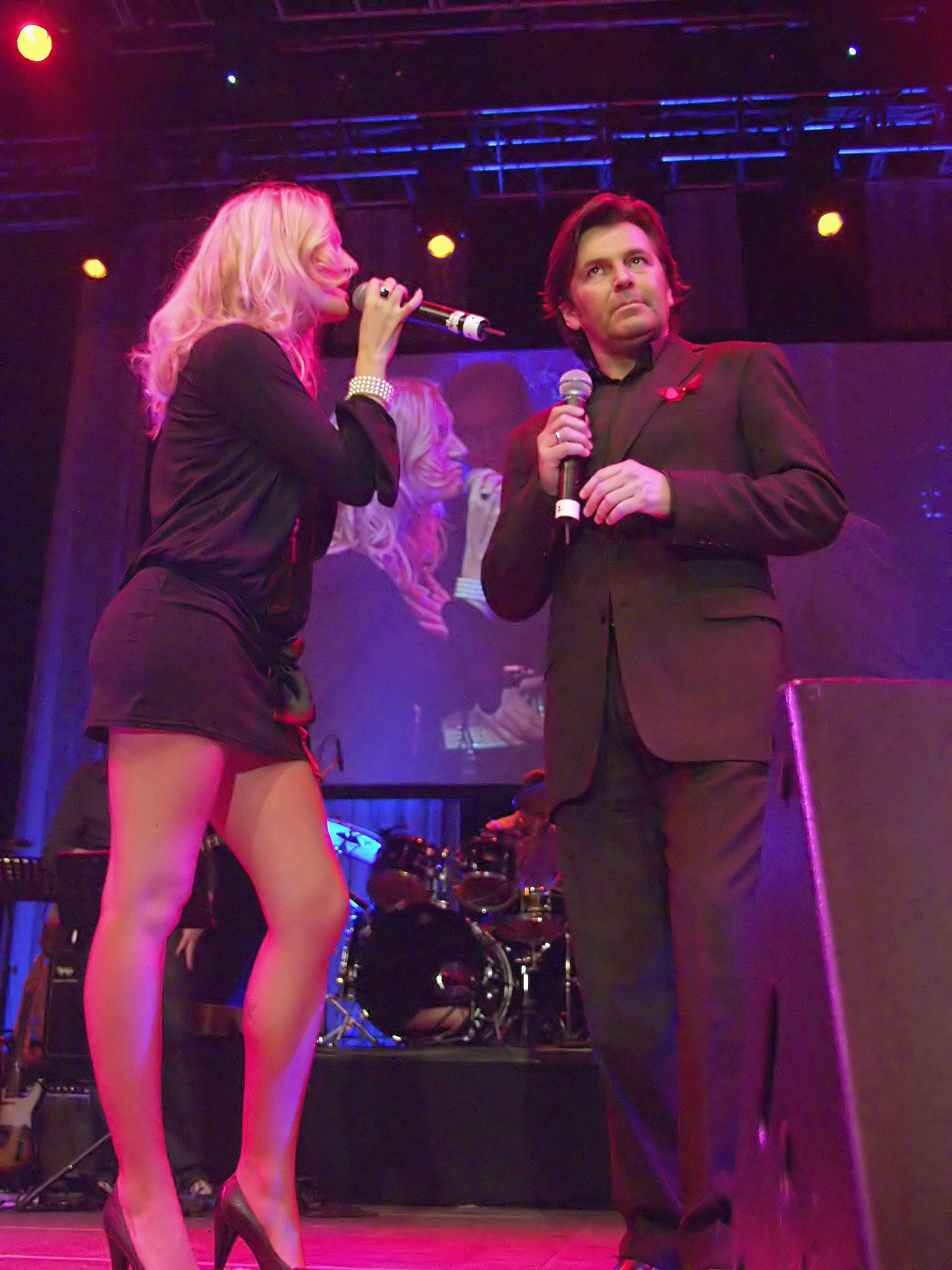
Anders performing with Juliette Schoppmann in 2007

Anders' third attempt at a solo career proved to be more successful, albeit unable to match the popularity of his Modern Talking periods. Shortly after the break-up of Modern Talking, Anders started recording his eighth solo album, pop effort This Time, which was released in February 2004. Unlike his previous attempts at a solo career, this album proved to be rather successful, climbing to the number 14 spot in Germany. Furthermore, the three singles from the album, "Independent Girl", "King of Love", and "Tonight Is the Night" charted at 17, 37, and 60 respectively, making This Time his biggest success as a solo artist in his native country. Furthermore, "King of Love" became a number 1 hit in Turkey, whereas "Independent Girl" reached number 1 in Russia. For the show Holiday on Ice, Anders composed and performed "Just Dream", which reached number 64 in Germany. He took part as a jury member in Stefan Raab's casting show SSDSGPS (Stefan sucht den Super Grand Prix Star), which searched for the German entrant for the 2003 Eurovision Song Contest and was a competing event to Dieter Bohlen's Deutschland sucht den Superstar. The same year and in 2009, he hosted the German companion show for the Eurovision Song Contest and became the host of Best of Formel Eins on Kabel1 in 2004. With his 2006 album Songs Forever, Anders again tried himself at swing cover songs, such as "For Your Eyes Only" or "Do You Really Want to Hurt Me". The album managed to peak at number 43 in Germany, but he failed to win the preliminaries to represent Germany during the 2006 Eurovision Song Contest. Also, during the 2006 FIFA World Cup in Germany, he hosted the accompanying music show "Auf nach Berlin" – WM-KultTour. In 2006, the Taras Shevchenko National University of Kyiv made him an honorary professor for "shaping the musical taste of a generation." Anders is especially successful in Eastern Europe, where he is considered a musical icon and still fills stadiums, while holding the distinction of being the most commercially successful foreign artist in Russia.

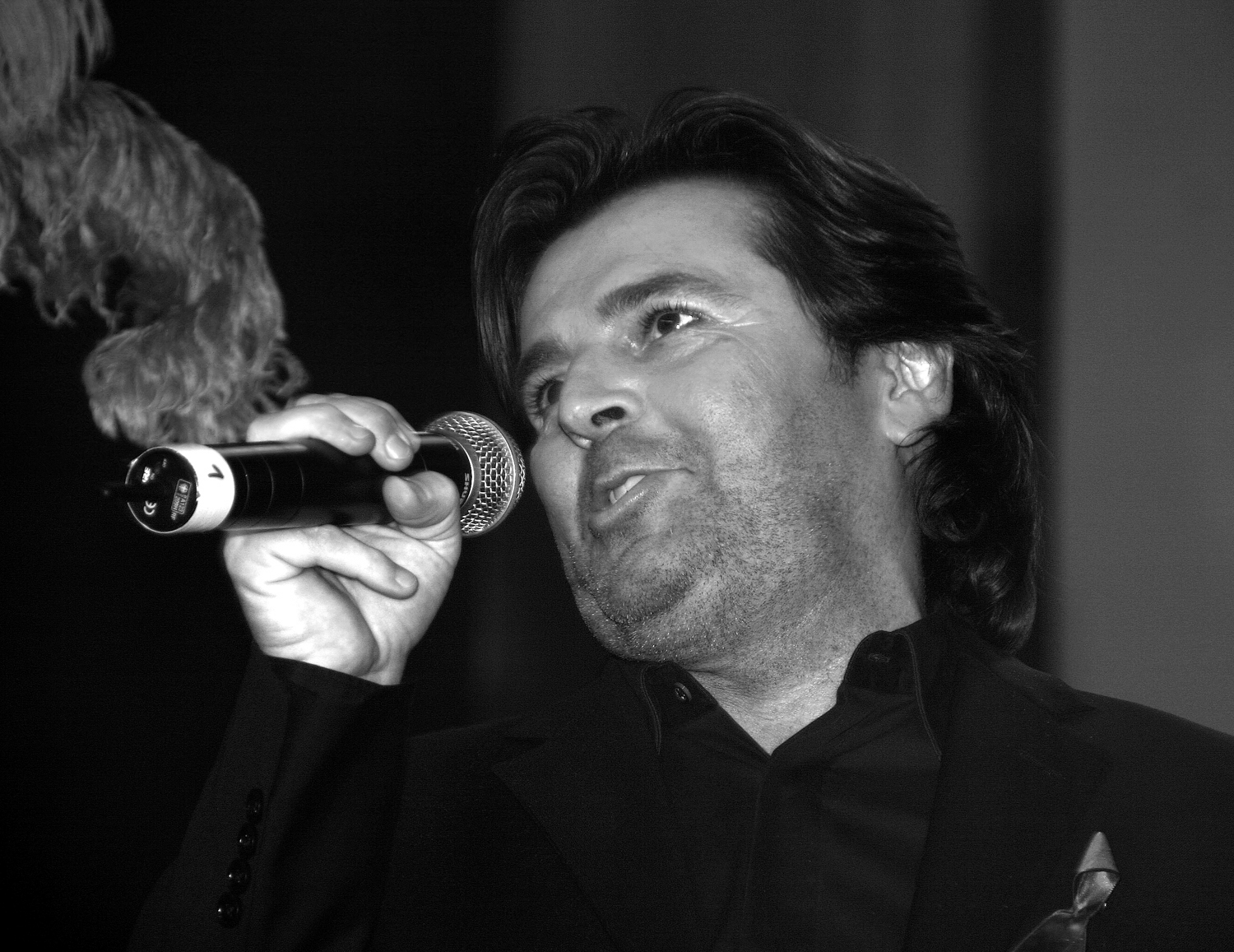
Anders performing at a charity concert in Cologne in November 2007

After not releasing any new material except a Christmas song and several features in 2008, as well as being featured on Sandra's 2009 single "The Night Is Still Young", which reached number 46 in Germany, Anders released another studio album in 2010. Strong, a return to electronic and pop, reached Platinum status in Russia for sales of more than 650.000 units, making him the best-selling international artist in Russia that year, while it failed to chart in Germany or other regions. The singles "Why Do You Cry" and "Stay With Me" also failed to make an impact, while the former peaked at No. 21 on Russian Airplay Chart. In 2010, he hosted music show Die neue Hitparade on RTL II. He returned to success with electronic and pop oriented Two, a 2011 collaboration album with German producer Jörn-Uwe Fahrenkrog-Petersen, performing under the moniker Anders|Fahrenkrog. The album reached number 11 in Germany, his highest charting release not with Modern Talking, and the single "Gigolo" climbed to number 40. In November 2012, Anders released a new solo album called Christmas for You. It includes seasonal hits such as "I'll Be Home for Christmas" and "It's the Most Wonderful Time of the Year" as well as covers of well-known classics such as "Silent Night" and Wham!'s "Last Christmas". On 9 August 2013, Anders in collaboration with Persian singer Omid Soltani released the song "We Are One". Due to the success of the releases in the vein of his Modern Talking era hits, he released the album History in 2016, which featured two new songs as well as new renditions of most Modern Talking singles. It peaked at number 42 in Germany.

=== 2017–present: Return to German language music ===
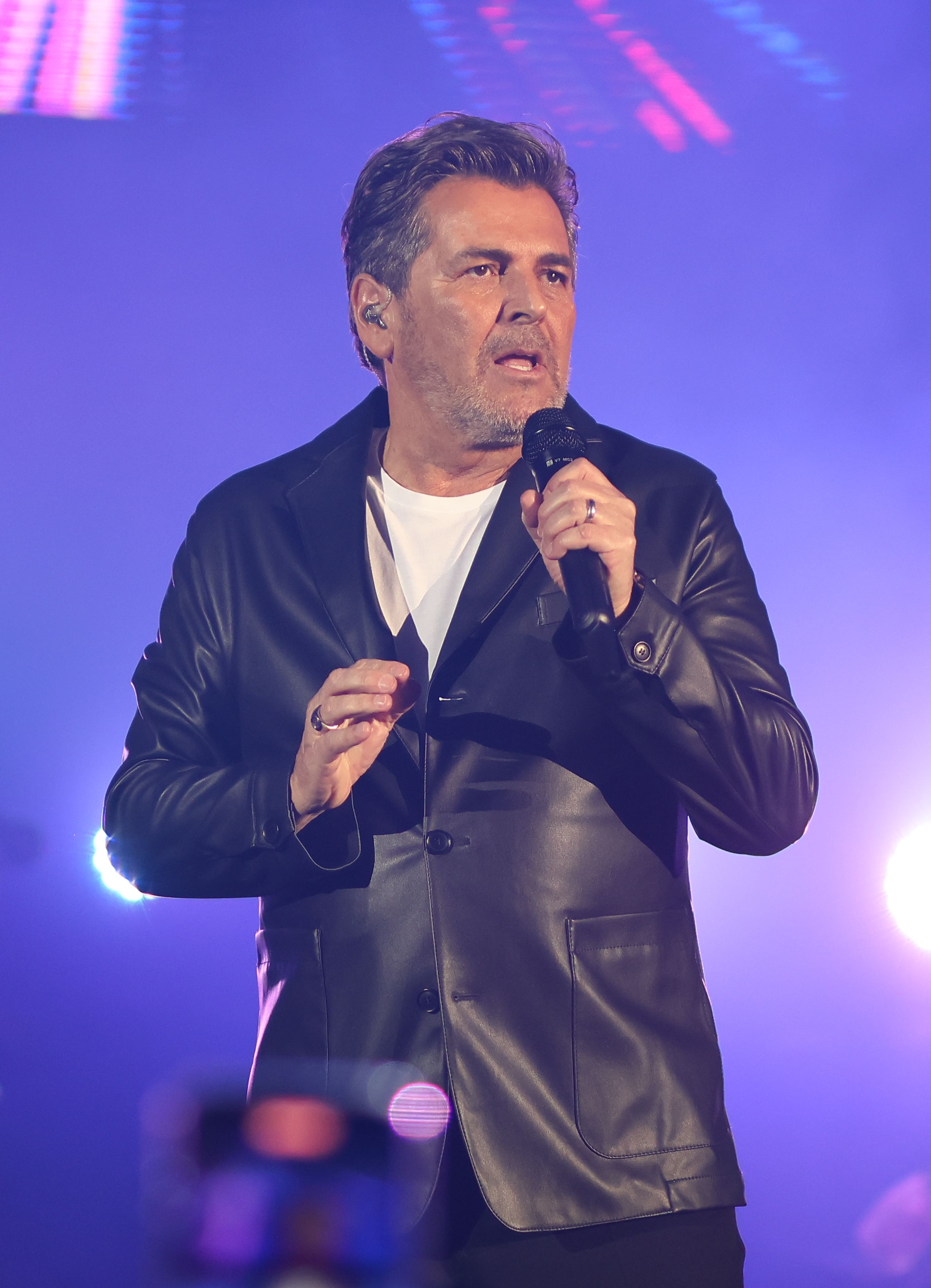
Anders performing in Sofia in 2023.

In April 2017, Anders released his first German language song in almost 35 years, "Der beste Tag meines Lebens" ("The best day of my life"). While it failed to chart, the accompanying studio album Pures Leben ("Pure Life"), promoted as his first German language release, peaked at number 14 in Germany. Anders has stated that he was pleasantly surprised by the album's success, asserting that he is more popular abroad than in his home country, fully knowing that people would most likely be indifferent to a German language album by him. On 1 May 2018, Anders was announced as a judge on the revival of the German version of X Factor. Later that year, he released his second German language album, Ewig mit dir ("Forever with you"), which managed to climb to number 12 on the German albums chart. It produced two singles, "Das Leben ist jetzt" ("Life is now") and "Sie sagte doch sie liebt mich" ("But she said she loved me"), a duet with Florian Silbereisen, which managed to reach number 70 on the German singles chart. In 2025, he started a project called Thomas Anders ...sings Modern Talking.

== Personal life ==
Anders is the son of Helga and Peter Weidung. He has one brother, Achim, and one sister, Tania. He was married to Nora Balling from 1984 to 1999. On 15 July 2000 he married Claudia Hess. They have one son, Alexander Mick Weidung who was born on 27 June 2002.

In early 2026, Anders officially dropped his birth name, since artist names no longer being listed in passport documents led to problems while travelling. His wife and son also changed their last name to Anders at the same time.

== Discography ==
- Different (1989)
- Whispers (1991)
- Down on Sunset (1992)
- When Will I See You Again (1993)
- Barcos de Cristal (1994)
- Souled (1995)
- This Time (2004)
- Songs Forever (2006)
- Strong (2010)
- Christmas for You (2012)
- History (2016)
- Pures Leben (2017)
- Ewig mit dir (2018)
- Cosmic (2021)
