= Florian Silbereisen =

German schlager singer

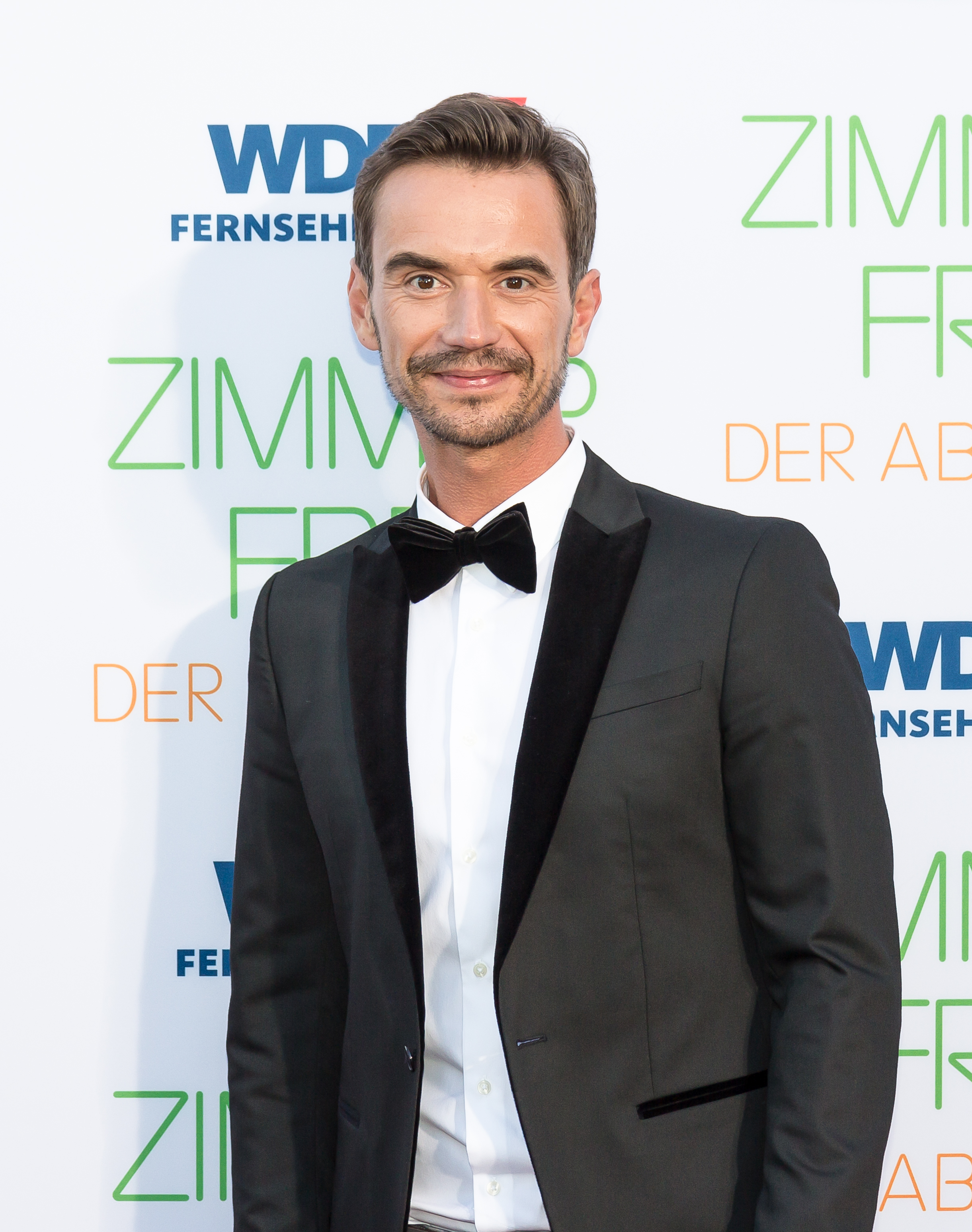
- Silbereisen in 2016
- Born: Florian Bernd Silbereisen; 4 August 1981 (age 43); Passau, West Germany
- Occupation(s): Singer, show host
- Years active: 1990s–present
- Television: Feste der Volksmusik
- Partner: Helene Fischer (2008-2018)
- Musical career
- Genres: Schlager, Volksmusik
- Instrument(s): Vocals, accordion

Florian Bernd Silbereisen (born 4 August 1981) is a German schlager singer and television host. Since February 2004, Silbereisen has been a television presenter of the show Feste der Volksmusik on German broadcaster ARD.

He was in a relationship with singer Helene Fischer.
