= Christian De Walden =

Christian de Walden
- Origin: Italy
- Genres: Pop, Latin pop
- Occupations: Songwriter, producer
- Instruments: Keyboards, programming
- Years active: 1972–present
- Website: dewaldenmusic.com

Christian de Walden (September 12, 1946 – November 8, 2025) was a record producer, composer, arranger and songwriter of Italian origin, who resided in Los Angeles, California. He wrote and produced songs for Amanda Lear, Audrey Landers, Bonnie Bianco, Anne Murray, Brigitte Nielsen, Engelbert Humperdinck, Michael Holm, Thomas Anders, Marta Sánchez, the Three Degrees, Cheap Trick, Bad English, XLR8, Charlie Green, Rachelle Ann Go, Lorena Herrera, Sarah Geronimo, Vanna Vanna and others.

In 2003, de Walden was honored by the BMI Latin Awards as a songwriter of "Yo No Soy Esa Mujer", recorded by the Latin Grammy nominee Paulina Rubio.

== Charted songs ==
- “How Deep Is Your Love” - Thomas Anders (1992, #71 Germany)
- “Standing Alone” - Thomas Anders & Glenn Medeiros (1992, #72 Germany)
- “When Will I See You Again” - Thomas Anders & the Three Degrees (1993, #37 Germany)
- “I'll Love You Forever” - Thomas Anders (1993, #79 Germany)
- “Desesperada” - Marta Sánchez (1994, #10 Billboard Hot Latin Tracks)
- “De Mujer a Mujer” - Marta Sánchez (1994, #22 Billboard Hot Latin Tracks)
- “Luna de Plata (My One and Only)” - Kiara (1995, #26 Billboard Hot Latin Tracks)
- “Dime La Verdad” - Marta Sánchez (1995, #9 Billboard Hot Latin Tracks)
- “Arena Y Sol” - Marta Sánchez (1995, #20 Billboard Hot Latin Tracks)
- “La Belleza” - Marta Sánchez (1996, #26 Billboard Hot Latin Tracks)
- “No More Turning Back” - Gitta (2000, #63 Holland)
