= Marta Sánchez =

Spanish singer (born 1966)

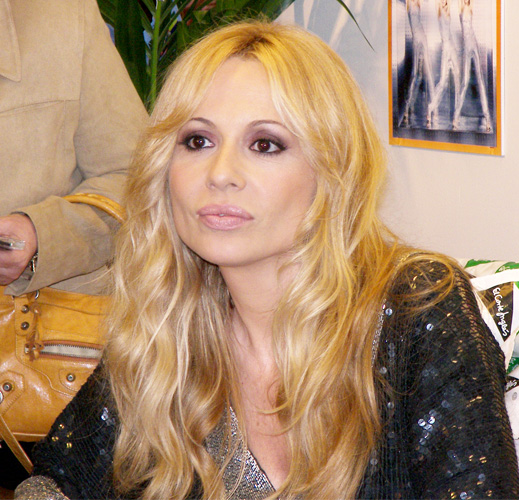
- Sánchez in 2007

Background information
- Born: Marta Sánchez López; 8 May 1966 (age 60); Madrid, Spain
- Genres: Pop rock; dance; pop; R&B; Latin pop
- Occupations: Singer; guitarist
- Years active: 1985–present
- Website: Official website

Marta Sánchez López (born 8 May 1966) is a Spanish singer. She has sold more than 10 million albums.

== Biography ==
Marta was born in Madrid, Spain. Her father, Antonio Sánchez Camporro, was an Asturian opera singer. She began her musical career with the band Cristal Oskuro, but shortly after she was discovered by Tino Azores, a sound technician for the popular pop/rock group Olé Olé. In 1985, Marta became the band's lead singer replacing Vicky Larraz, which brought her to fame and made her one of the biggest sex symbols of the 1980s in Spain, during a time when the country was easing the traditional rigid moral values of Catholicism.

Her first hit with Olé Olé was "Lili Marlen", a Spanish adaptation of the popular World War II German love song (Its greatest hit was singing this same theme in the Televisión Española New Year Celebration, aired on 31 December 1986). Other hits like "Bailando Sin Salir de Casa" and "Con Sólo Una Mirada" followed with the group. She remained with the band until 1991 before deciding to pursue a solo career.

In 1993, Sanchez released her debut solo album, Mujer produced by Ralf Stemmann. Its first single, "Desesperada", written by Stephen Singer, Austin Roberts was released both in Spain and The Americas was a huge top ten hit and now with 99 Million streams on Spotify. A second single, "Tal Vez", was provided by Thomas Anders and Ralf Stemmann, but it was the 3rd single, "De Mujer a Mujer" which would establish her as a household name all over Latin America. Following this successful debut album, Marta released Woman, an English version of Mujer. This made her one of the first Latin artists to do the English crossover. Sánchez received a nomination for a Lo Nuestro Award for Pop New Artist of the Year at the 7th Lo Nuestro Awards.

Marta's second solo album, Mi Mundo, was released in 1995 with worldwide hits like "Dime La Verdad" followed by "Arena y Sol" and "La Belleza". Due to the success of Mi Mundo, Marta once again released her second album in English titled My World. In 1996, Marta recorded "Obsession", a song for the movie Curdled produced by Quentin Tarantino.

Her third solo album, Azabache, was released in 1997 with the collaboration of Slash (formerly from Guns N' Roses) and Nile Rodgers. The first single, "Moja Mi Corazón" reached number one in Spain and Mexico's pop airplay in 1997. Also in 1997, she recorded the duet "Vivo Por Ella" ("Vivo per lei") with Andrea Bocelli. It became a major hit in Latin America. Marta released her fourth album, Desconocida, written by Stephen Singer in 1998. Its hits include "Desconocida", "Quiero Más de Ti" and "Los Mejores Años de Nuestra Vida". In 2000 she led the musical La Magia de Broadway.

Her fifth album, Soy Yo, was released in 2002 and sold over 200,000 units in Spain. In 2004, she released Lo Mejor de Marta Sánchez a greatest hits compilation with three new songs, "Profundo Valor", "Caradura". The compilation also included updated versions (with new recorded vocals) of "Desesperada" and "Soldados del Amor" (from her Olé Olé days), produced by Carlos Jean. In 2005, she launched her first live album, Gira 2005: La Coruña En Directo, which was released on CD and DVD.

April 2007 saw the release of "Superstar", the lead single from her sixth studio album, Miss Sánchez. Produced and co-written by the electro hit maker DJ Sammy, the song became an instant hit, reaching the top positions on airplay and digital sales charts in Spain. Miss Sánchez debuted at number three on physical CD sales and at number one on digital sales. It is Marta's most successful album in Spain in terms of charting and was certified gold. Instead of releasing songs which had become fan favorites like "Si me cambias los recuerdos" or "Reina de la radio" as the second single, Marta choose the disco-influenced "Levántate", which became a minor hit in Spain, overshadowed by "Superstar"'s enduring popularity.

Sanchez was chosen as Europride 2007's Special Guest and the album was named Spanish Album of the Year at the 2007 Shangay Awards. In the end of 2008, she collaborated with Venezuelan singer Carlos Baute with the song "Colgando en tus manos". This was a huge hit, setting iTunes records in Spain and maintaining its number one spot for 29 straight weeks. The single was later released in the Americas and reached the coveted "Top Five" in Colombia, Venezuela, Argentina, Uruguay, Chile, Puerto Rico, El Salvador, Ecuador and Peru. The single was number one in Mexico and was number one on Billboard Latin Pop Songs for two weeks in a row.

A greatest hits album with special guests was released on 3 November 2010. After major success with her duets Greatest Hits been only released in her native Spain. Marta released the English language song "Get Together" with D-Mol in association with Bacardi. In 2012 and 2013, Marta released the song "Mi Cuerpo Pide Mas" with a remake of her Ole Ole hit "No Controles 2012" featuring Fashion Beat Team and her duet "Hasta el Fin" with fellow artists Monica Naranjo and Maria Jose. Late 2013 saw the last Marta single "Y, Si Fuera Ella?" part of the Alejandro Sanz tribute album of the same name.

Late 2014 saw the return of Marta with new material. On 23 September 2014, "La Que Nunca Se Rinde" was released on iTunes and a new album with unedited material was announced been in the works. The music video debuted on 13 October 2014. It was announced in December that the album would be titled "21 Dias" and the cover art was shown. Marta announced on her Facebook that pre-orders were made available for "21 Días" and the release date would be 24 February 2015 on Digital Download and physical release (Spain Only), 5 songs were made available with digital pre-orders. On 16 February 2015 it was announced that "Welcome" an English song would serve as the album's second single. The song was made available on iTunes that same day with the music video debuting on 20 February 2015.

== Discography ==
=== Albums ===
- Mujer (1993) * Woman (1994)
- Mi Mundo (1995)
- My World (1995)
- Azabache (1997)
- One Step Closer (1997)
- Desconocida (1998)
- Perfect Stranger (1999)
- Los Mejores Años de Nuestra Vida Greatest Hits (2001)
- Soy Yo (2002)
- Lo Mejor de Marta Sánchez (2004)
- Marta Sánchez en Directo La Coruña Gira 2005 (2005)
- Miss Sánchez (2007)
- De Par en Par (2010)
- 21 Días (2015)
- 40 años 1985-2025 (2025)

=== Singles ===
==== As lead artist ====
List of singles, with selected chart positions and certifications, showing year released and album name
Title	Year	Peak chart positions					Album
Title	Year	SPA	US Latin	ARG	CHI	MEX	Album
"Desesperada"	1993	1	10	1	1	1	Mujer
"Tal Vez"	1994	20	—	—	—	—	Mujer
"De Mujer a Mujer"	1994	2	22	3	2	1	Mujer
"Lejos de Aquella Noche"	1994	—	—	—	—	—	Mujer
"Dime la Verdad"	1995	1	9	3	1	1	Mi Mundo
"Arena y Sol"	1995	1	20	3	1	1	Mi Mundo
"¿Qué Harás Tú Cuando Mueras?"	1995	38	—	—	—	—	Mi Mundo
"La Belleza"	1995	4	—	—	—	10	Mi Mundo
"Vivo por Ella" (with Andrea Bocelli)	1996	1	17	1	1	1	Azabache & Romanza
"Moja Mi Corazón" (featuring Slash)	1997	1	16	4	2	1	Azabache
"Negro Azabache"	1997	—	—	—	—	—	Azabache
"Amor Perdido"	1997	10	—	3	3	2	Azabache
"Ya Ves"	1997	—	—	—	—	4	Azabache
"Quiero Más de Ti"	1998	9	—	6	9	4	Desconocida
"Desconocida"	1999	3	—	2	4	2	Desconocida
"Los Mejores Años de Nuestra Vida"	1999	4	—	12	9	5	Desconocida
"Estrellas de Fuego"	1999	—	—	—	—	—	Desconocida
"Loca de Amor"	1999	9	—	—	—	—	Desconocida
"Sigo Intentando"	2002	1	—	–	–	1	Soy Yo
"Soy Yo"	2002	1	—	2	7	1	Soy Yo
"No Te Quiero Más"	2002	2	–	–	–	–	Soy Yo
"Amor Cobarde"	2002	—	—	—	—	–	Soy Yo
"Es La Noche del Amor"	2003	–	—	—	—	—	Disney: Ellas & Magia
"Profundo Valor"	2004	1	—	—	—	—	Lo Mejor de Marta Sánchez
"Superstar"	2007	14	—	—	—	12	Miss Sánchez
"Levántate"	2007	—	—	—	—	–	Miss Sánchez
"Si Me Cambian Los Recuerdos"	2007	—	—	—	—	—	Miss Sánchez
"Reina de La Radio"	2007	—	—	—	—	—	Miss Sánchez
"Colgando En Tus Manos" (with Carlos Baute)	2008	1	4	1	1	1	De Mi Puño y Letra
"Soy Yo" (with Nena Daconte)	2010	–	—	—	—	—	De Par en Par
"Mi Cuerpo Pide Más"	2012	–	—	—	—	—	Non-album single
"Y, ¿Si Fuera Ella?"	2013	–	—	—	—	—	Non-album single
"Get It Up	2013	–	—	—	—	—	Non-album single
"La Que Nunca Se Rinde"	2015	11	—	—	—	–	21 Días
"Welcome"	2015	—	—	—	—	–	21 Días
"21 Días" (with Carlos Rivera)	2015	—	—	—	—	–	21 Días
"Duermes Mientras Yo Escribo"	2015	—	—	—	—	–	21 Días
"El Ganador"	2016	–	—	—	—	—	Non-album single

== Videography ==
- "Desesperada"
- "Desperate Lovers"
- "De Mujer A Mujer"
- "Dime La Verdad"
- "Such A Mystery"
- "Arena Y Sol"
- "Vivo Por Ella"
- "Moja Mi Corazón"
- "La Noche Del Amor"
- "Desconocida"
- "Perfect Stranger"
- "Quiero Más de Ti"
- "Sigo Intentando"
- "Soy Yo"
- "Profundo Valor"
- "Nadie Mejor Que Tú (Fangoria)"
- "Superstar"
- "Levantate"
- "Embrujada"
- "Get Together"
- "Mi Cuerpo Pide Mas"
- "Y, ¿Si Fuera Ella?"
- "La Que Nunca Se Rinde"
- "Welcome"
- "21 Dias"
- "El Ganador"
- "Brillar"

== Filmography ==
Year	Title	Notes
2012	(Mexico) La Academia 10: The Decade Generation	Judge
2013–2014	(Spain) Tu cara me suena 3	Judge
2016	(Argentina) Bailando 2016	Disqualified
2023	(Uruguay) ¿Quién es la máscara? 2	1st unmasked

== Other sources ==
- Small biography about Marta Sánchez
- Biography and discography
- Biography of the singer Marta Sánchez
- Entry at Biografías.es
- Biography at MundoDescargas
- Pictures and Notes of Marta Sánchez
