= Sky (disambiguation) =

The sky is the area above the Earth as seen from the ground.

Sky or SKY may also refer to:

- The atmosphere, gases surrounding a planet or other material body
- The heavens, religious cosmological or transcendent supernatural place
- Outer space, the expanse that exists beyond Earth and between celestial bodies

== People ==
=== Surname ===
- Amy Sky (born 1960), Canadian musician, actress, and TV host
- Big Sky, later stage name for Canadian professional wrestler and actor Tyler Mane
- Captain Sky (born 1957), American musician and singer

=== Given name ===
- Li Xiaofeng (born 1985), nicknamed Sky, Chinese professional gamer
- Ron Nesher (aka Sky, Sky Da Mac or Ron Sky Nesher) (born 1983), Israeli rapper
- Sky Andrew (born 1962), English Olympian and sports agent
- Sky Blu (rapper) (born 1986), American rapper and singer-songwriter
- Sky Brown (born 2008), British-Japanese skateboarder
- Sky Christopherson (born 1976), American cyclist
- Sky Cubacub, Filipino-American designer and activist
- Sky Dayton (born 1971), American entrepreneur and investor
- Sky du Mont (born 1947), German-Argentine actor
- Sky Dylan-Robbins (born 1989), American journalist
- Sky Ferreira (born 1992), American singer-songwriter, model, and actress
- Sky Gilbert (born 1952), Canadian writer and actor
- Sky Glabush (born 1970), Canadian artist
- Sky Hopinka (born 1984), Native American visual artist and filmmaker
- Sky Kim (born 1982), Korean-Australian Olympic archer
- Sky Lee (born 1952), Chinese-Canadian artist and novelist
- Sky Low Low (1928–1998), Canadian professional midget wrestler
- Sky Macklay (born 1988), American composer
- Sky Metalwala (born 2009), a boy from Redmond, Washington who disappeared in 2011
- Sky Rompiendo (born 1992), Colombian producer, songwriter and DJ
- Sky Saxon (1937–2009), American musician
- Sky van Hoff (born 1986), German record producer
- Sky Wu (born 1966), Taiwanese singer
- Suryakumar Yadav (born 1990), Indian cricketer known by his initials SKY

=== Religion and mythology ===
- Sky deity, a deity associated with the sky

=== Fictional characters ===
- Sky (Winx Club), in Winx Club
- Sky, in the Shantae franchise
- Sky, from Total Drama: Pahkitew Island
- Cure Sky, from the anime series Soaring Sky! Pretty Cure
- Sky Love Cruz, from Philippine drama series Senior High and High Street
- Sky Mangel, from the Australian television soap opera Neighbours
- Sky Smith, from the British science fiction television series The Sarah Jane Adventures
- Sky Tate, from the Power Rangers television series universe
- Reby Sky (born 1986), in Total Nonstop Action Wrestling
- Velvet Sky (born 1981), in Total Nonstop Action Wrestling

== Places ==
- Griffing Sandusky Airport (IATA airport code SKY), Ohio, US
- Sky (skyscraper), New York, US
- Sky Crater, Thule, 486958 Arrokoth (Ultima Thule), Kuiper Belt, Solar System

== Business ==
=== Aviation ===
- Sky Airline, in Chile
- Skymark Airlines, in Japan by ICAO code
- Sky Paragliders, a Czech aircraft manufacturer
- Sky Airlines, Antalya, Turkey
- Sky Aviation (Indonesia)
- Sky Aviation (Sierra Leone)
- Sky Aviation Leasing International, acquired by Goshawk Aviation
- Blue Sky Airlines, Armenia
- SkyTeam, an airline alliance

=== Broadcasting ===
- Sky Television (disambiguation)
- Sky Group, a pan-European satellite broadcasting company
  - Sky Deutschland, its German and Austrian subsidiary
    - Sky Cinema (Germany), a channel of Sky Deutschland
    - Sky Sport (Germany), a channel of Sky Deutschland
    - Sky Atlantic (German TV channel), a channel of Sky Deutschland
    - Sky Switzerland, its Swiss subsidiary
  - Sky Ireland, its Irish subsidiary
  - Sky Italia, its Italian subsidiary
    - Sky HD (Italy), a channel of Sky Italia
    - Sky Sport (Italian TV channel), a channel of Sky Italia
    - Sky TG24, a channel of Sky Italia
    - Sky Uno, a channel of Sky Italia
    - Sky Atlantic (Italian TV channel), a channel of Sky Italia
  - Sky UK, its UK subsidiary
    - Sky One, a former channel of Sky UK; replaced Sky Showcase and Sky Max
    - Sky Showcase, a channel of Sky UK; replaced by Sky One
    - Sky Max, a channel of Sky UK; replaced by Sky One
    - Sky Replay, a channel of Sky UK
    - Sky+, a former product of Sky UK
    - Sky+ HD, a former product of Sky UK
    - Sky Q, a product of Sky UK
    - Sky Glass, a product of Sky UK
    - Sky Stream, a product of Sky UK
    - Sky Go, a service of Sky UK
    - Sky Broadband, a service of Sky UK
    - Sky Cinema, a channel of Sky UK
    - Sky News, a channel of Sky UK
    - Sky Sports, a channel of Sky UK
    - Sky Atlantic, a channel of Sky UK
    - Now (Sky), a service of Sky UK
- Sky Brasil, a subscription television service in Brazil
- Sky México, a subscription television service in Mexico, Central America and Dominican Republic
- Sky News Australia, a TV channel
- Sky Angel, a Christian TV and radio service
- Sky Racing, an Australian racing broadcaster
  - Sky Sports Radio, Australia
- Sky HD (South Korea)
  - Sky Living
- Sky Media Group, an Estonian media company
  - Sky Plus, an Estonian radio station
  - SKY Radio, a Russian language radio station in Estonia
- Sky Network Television, a subscription television service in New Zealand
  - Sky News New Zealand
  - Sky Sport (New Zealand), sports-oriented television channels
  - Sky 5, formerly "SKY 1" and "the BOX"
  - Sky Movies (New Zealand), subscription television movie channels
  - Sky Box Office (New Zealand), a group of movie pay-per-view channels
- SKY PerfecTV!, a Japanese satellite broadcasting company
- Sky Turk, a Turkish national news channel
- Sky Cable Corporation, a Filipino telecommunications company involved primarily in pay television
  - Sky Cable, a Philippine cable television provider
- Tata Play, an Indian satellite broadcasting company formerly known as Tata Sky
- WSKY-FM, an FM radio station in Florida
- WSKY-TV, SKY 4 TV, a North Carolina television station
- Sky Radio Group, a chain of Dutch radio stations
  - Sky Radio, a Dutch radio station, part of Sky Radio Group
- Thai Sky TV, a defunct Thai satellite television broadcaster

=== Other ===
- Sky Financial Group or Sky Bank, former American financial services holding company
- Sky Global, Canadian communication network and secure-messaging provider
- Sky Railway, tourist railroad in New Mexico

== Books and periodicals ==
- Sky Magazine, a publication of BSkyB
  - Sky Kids magazine, included with Sky Magazine from 2004 to 2009
- SKY Magazine, a UK entertainment magazine published between the late 1980s and June 2001
- The Sky (magazine), an amateur astronomy magazine published between 1935 and 1941
- Delta Sky Magazine (aka "Sky"), magazine of Delta Air Lines

== Film and TV ==
=== Film ===
- Sky (2015 film), a French-German film
- Sky (2021 film), a Russian film
- Sky (2026 film), an Indian film

=== Television series ===
- Sky (TV serial), a 1975 British children's fantasy series
- Sky (Malaysian TV series), a 2007 Malaysian Chinese idol drama
- "Sky" (The Sarah Jane Adventures), a television episode
- The Sky (Canadian TV series)

== Music ==
=== Groups ===
- Sky (American band), American country band in the 1970s
- Sky (Canadian band), Canadian pop rock group (1997–2005)
- Sky (English/Australian band), instrumental / progressive rock band (1979–1995)
- Nina Sky, US musical twins

=== Albums ===
- Sky (Faye Wong album), 1994
- Sky (Sky album), 1979
- Sky 2 (album), 1980, released as Sky in North American markets
- Sky (Yui Horie album), 2003
- The Sky (album), by Anita Kerr and Rod McKuen

=== Songs ===
- "Sky" (Playboi Carti song), 2020
- "Sky" (Sonique song), 2000
- "Sky" (Titanium song), 2012
- "Sky", by Alan Walker and Alex Skrindo, 2017
- "Sky", by Crash Vegas from Red Earth, 1989
- "Sky", by Damien Leith from The Winner's Journey, 2006
- "Sky", by the Human League from Credo, 2011
- "Sky", by Jolin Tsai from J-Game, 2005

== Sports ==
- Chicago Sky, a women's basketball team
- Team Sky, a British cycling team
- SkyRace or Sky, a skyrunning discipline
- SKY Racing Team VR46, an Italian motorcycle team

== Other uses ==
- SKY technique, or spectral karyotype, in cytogenetics
- Saturn Sky, an automobile
- Sky (hieroglyph), ancient Egyptian
- SKY (universities), 3 universities in South Korea
- Sky blue
- Sky Bar, candy
- SKY (keyboard layout), for Japanese with Latin alphabet
- Sky (video game), 2019
- Finnish Cannabis Association (Suomen kannabisyhdistys)

== See also ==
- Sky island (disambiguation)
- Skye (disambiguation)
  - Isle of Skye, Scotland
- Skyy (disambiguation)
- Celestial (disambiguation)
- Heaven (disambiguation)
- Space (disambiguation)
- Touch the Sky (disambiguation)
