= Sky (magazine) =

Sky is the name of multiple magazines.

It may refer to:

- SKY Magazine (1987–2001; aka "SKY"), British pop cultural magazine, published fortnightly by News International and then monthly by EMAP
- Sky Magazine (ceased 2011; aka "Sky Mag"), British pop culture magazine for Sky Digital subscribers published by BSkyB
  - Sky Kids (magazine) (2004–2009), a children's edition of the BSkyB magazine
  - Skymag Ireland, the Irish edition of the BSkyB magazine
- The Sky (magazine) (1935–1941), U.S. astronomy magazine, predecessor to Sky and Telescope
- Delta Sky Magazine, Delta Air Lines inflight magazine published by MSP Communications

It may also refer to:

- Sky & Telescope (since 1941), U.S. astronomy magazine founded as a merger between The Sky and The Telescope and The Amateur Astronomer
- BBC Sky at Night (since 2005), British astronomy magazine, complement to the TV programme The Sky At Night

== See also ==
- Sky (disambiguation)
