= Sky Kids =

Sky Kids may refer to:

- Sky Kids (magazine), a magazine
- Sky Kids (TV channel), a British television channel
- Sky Kids (New Zealand TV channel), a New Zealand television channel
- The Flyboys (film), a 2008 film that was released internationally as Sky Kids

== See also ==
- Sky Kid
- Spy Kids (disambiguation)
