= Hall of the Amigos del País =

Hall of the Amigos del País was located in Los Angeles, California. Erected in 1844, it was the first social hall or club house ever built on the North American Pacific Coast. It was the hall of the Sociedad Económica de los Amigos del País (Friends of the Country), a society or club made up of the leading citizens of the town, both native and foreign born, who, during the 1840s, formed a group with the dual purposes of providing pensions and stimulating the reading of literature.

A lot, 100 varas square, free of taxes, was granted the society by the Ayuntamiento. An adobe building was erected and fitted up with a dancing hall, reading room and card tables. The hall was dedicated by a grand ball and a number of social entertainments were held. The Amigos for a time enjoyed their social privileges, and the society flourished. But it was a time of revolutions and political disturbances. In time social amenities gave place to political animosities. Although the members were "Friends of the Country," they became enemies to one another. The society ran in debt. Its membership fell off. The building was finally put up at a lottery. Andrés Pico drew the lucky number. The Amigos del Pais disbanded during the Mexican–American War. Their hall in the course of time became a saloon and afterwards it was "Los dos Amigos," ("the two friends") —the friend behind the bar and the one in front of it. The McDonald Block, on North Main Street, was later built on the site of the Amigos’ hall.

== Reading room ==
The hall was the first attempt at a reading room and library during the Mexican era of Los Angeles’ history. A reading room was partitioned off from the main hall and a small library of books was collected. There were no daily newspapers in the reading room. A newspaper six months old was late news, and a book of the last century was quite fresh and readable. Again in 1856 and 1859, the Amigos furnished additional reading rooms in Los Angeles with donated books for members' use, which ultimately led to the development of the Los Angeles Library Association.
