= Josh Kun =

American academic

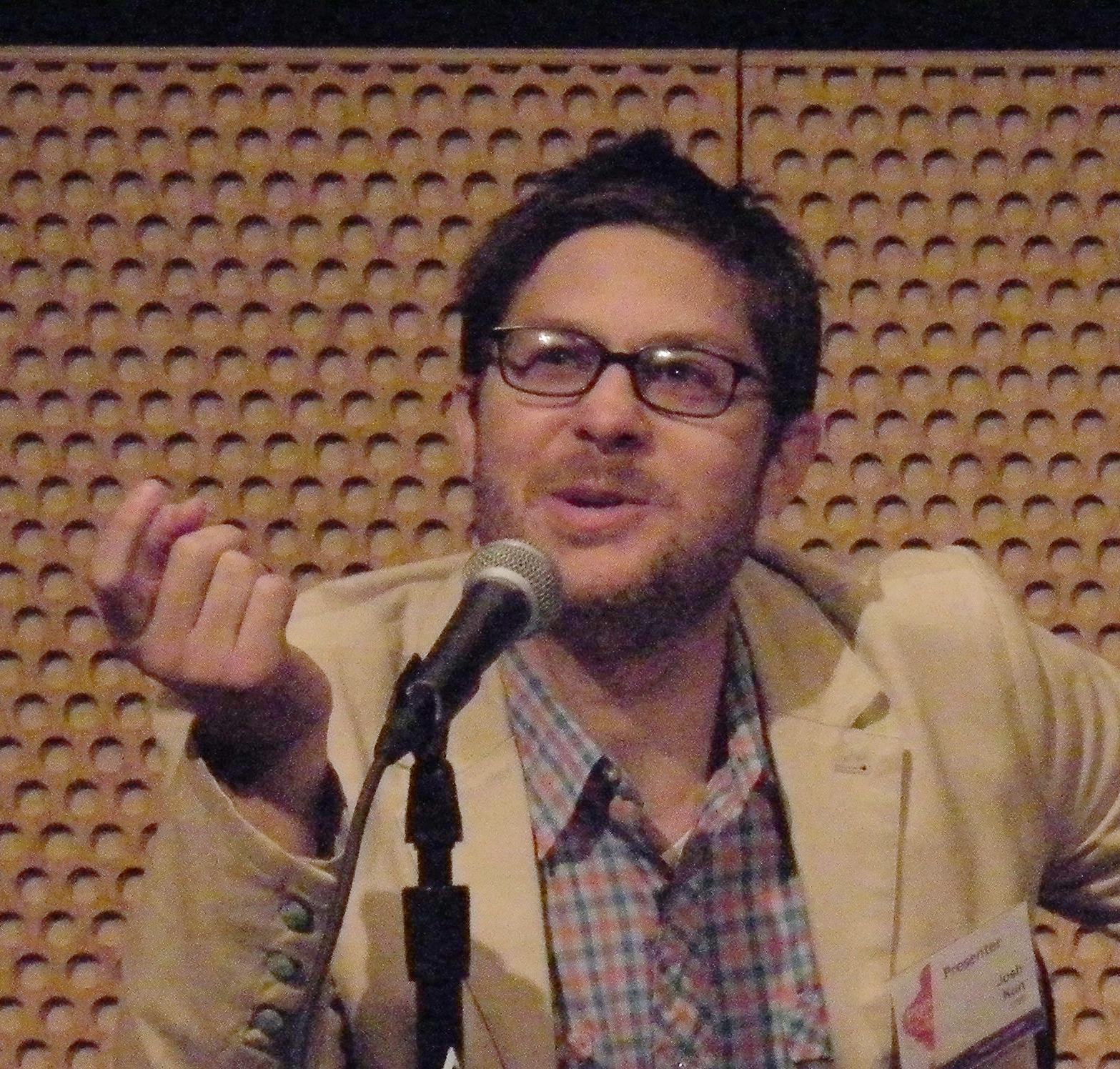
- Josh Kun in 2016
- Awards: MacArthur Fellowship

Academic background
- Education: University of California, Berkeley

Academic work
- Discipline: Music critic
- Sub-discipline: Popular music
- Institutions: University of California, Riverside, USC Annenberg School for Communication and Journalism

Josh Kun is an American author, academic and music critic. Kun is Professor of Communication and Journalism and chair in Cross-Cultural Communication in the Annenberg School at the University of Southern California. He also holds a joint appointment at USC's Department of American Studies and Ethnicity. He is the director of USC Annenberg's School of Communication, director of the Popular Music Project at USC Annenberg's the Norman Lear Center and co-editor of the book series Refiguring American Music for Duke University Press.

Kun serves on the boards of Dublab, Los Angeles Contemporary Exhibitions, and the Latin American Cinemateca, and on the editorial boards of American Quarterly, the International Journal of Communication, and the Journal of Popular Music Studies. He has also worked as a consultant and curator with the Los Angeles Public Library, the Walt Disney Concert Hall, the Autry National Center, and the Santa Monica Museum of Art. He is a 2016 MacArthur Fellow.

== Early life and education ==
Josh Kun attended the Harvard School (prior to its merger with Westlake), a private university preparatory day school in Los Angeles, and then Duke University, where he received a B.A. in literature in 1993. He graduated from University of California, Berkeley, with a Ph.D. in ethnic studies. Prior to USC, he was an associate professor of English at the University of California, Riverside. His research focuses on the arts and politics of cultural connection, with an emphasis on popular music, the cultures of globalization, the US-Mexico border, and Jewish-American musical history.

== Works ==
In 2005, he co-founded Reboot Stereophonic, a non-profit record label dedicated to excavating lost treasures of Jewish-American music. Reboot has been featured in The New York Times and on National Public Radio. He is also a co-founder of the Idelsohn Society for Musical Preservation, which is named for Abraham Zevi Idelsohn, legendary Jewish musicologist and writer of the classic "Hava Nagila". The Idelsohn Society is committed to the belief that music creates conversations otherwise impossible in daily life. The Society's goal is to incite a new conversation about the present by listening anew to the past, focusing on stories of hybrid identities, eclectic communities, racial dialogue, and pioneering musical style, music that forces listeners to interrogate their own identities.

Dr. Kun's October 2009 exhibit "Last Exit USA" at the Steve Turner Contemporary Gallery in Los Angeles focused on popular music exchanges between Mexico and the U.S. in the 1960s, complete with 44 album covers and two listening stations. According to the Los Angeles Times review of the exhibit, "Listening to Kun's selections is like visiting a world both familiar and strange, a sort of parallel universe that is disorienting, eye-opening, exciting."

As a critic and journalist, Kun is a regular contributor to The New York Times, the Los Angeles Times, Los Angeles, Vibe, Tu Ciudad Los Angeles, the San Francisco Bay Guardian, and the Boston Phoenix.

In an article for American Quarterly titled "What Is an MC If He Can't Rap to Banda? Making Music in Nuevo L.A.", Kun wrote about the cultural—especially musical—crossovers between the United States and Mexico, particularly between Los Angeles and Mexico. He analyzes the cultural implications and intersections in the song "No Hay Manera" by Akwid, a song first popularized in 2003, which aired on both KPWR 105.9, a popular R&B and hip-hop station in L.A., and La Que Buena (KBUE), one of Mexico's leading radio stations. The song samples brass and vocal elements from Banda El Recodo's rendition of the song "Te Lo Pido Por Favor". Kun argues that "No Hay Manera" is a sufficient representation of the idea that cultural and musical hybridity is a form of authenticity, and that immigrant communities express their diaspora in an active, not passive (or observatory), fashion.

== Awards ==
- Arts Writers Fellow with the Sundance Institute
- Fellow of the Ucross Foundation and the Mesa Refuge
- 2006 American Book Award, for Audiotopia: Music, Race, and America
- 2007 Unity Award in Media, for his journalism on the US-Mexico border
- 2007 finalist for Southern California Journalism Award

== Books ==
- 2011: The Song Is Not the Same: Jews and American Popular Music. The Jewish Role in American Life; Vol. 7., Annual Volume of the USC Casden Institute.
- 2011: Black and Brown Los Angeles: A Contemporary Reader (with Laura Pulido)
- 2011: Sound Clash: Listening to American Studies; American Quarterly special issue (with Kara Keeling)
- 2008: And You Shall Know Us by the Trail of Our Vinyl: The Jewish Past As Told by the Records We've Loved and Lost (with Roger Bennett)
- 2005: Audiotopia: Music, Race, and America

== Exhibitions and lectures ==
- 2011: "Re-Assembling Tijuana" – Guest speaker, with Adriana Trujillo and José Inerzia. Led by Rene Peralta. West Hollywood Library.
- 2010: "Black Sabbath: The Music of Blacks and Jews" – Co-curator. Contemporary Jewish Museum, San Francisco.
- 2009: "Jews on Vinyl" – Co-curator. Contemporary Jewish Museum (San Francisco) and Skirball Cultural Center (Los Angeles).
- 2009: "Last Exit USA" – Solo installation. Steve Turner Contemporary Gallery, Los Angeles.

== Academic publications ==
- 2011: "Playing the Fence, Listening to the Line: Sound, Sound Art, and Acoustic Politics at the US-Mexico Border". Performance in the Borderlands: A Critical Anthology. Eds. Harvey Young and Ramon Rivera-Servera. Palgrave.
- 2011: "The Tijuana Sound: Blues, Brass, and the Musical Borders of the 1960s". Transnational Encounters: Music and Performance at the U.S.-Mexico Border. Ed. Alejandro Madrid. Oxford University Press.
- 2011: "California Sueños". Boom: A Journal of California Studies. Issue 1, Volume 1. UC Press.
- 2011: "The Sound of '68: Notes on the Musical Legacy of Tlateloco". Kalfou. Special journal issue, "1968". University of Minnesota Press.
- 2010: "Black Sabbath". Liner notes essay. Black Sabbath: The Secret Musical History of Black-Jewish Relations. Idelsohn Society for Musical Preservation.
- 2010: "El Disco Es Cultura". The Record: Contemporary Art and Vinyl. Ed. Trevor Schoonmaker.
- 2010: "Tijuana and the Borders of Race". The Blackwell Companion to Los Angeles. Eds. William Deverell and Greg Hise.
- 2009: "Have An Hors D' Ouevrey Irvy: The Music of Jewish-American Food". Koscher & Co. Exhibition Catalog. Judisches Museum Berlin.
- 2009: "The Sound of the Desert Sublime". Convergence: Special Issue on "The Sonic West." Ed. Stephen Aron.
- 2009: "Mazel Tov, Mis Amigos". Liner notes essay. Juan Calle and His Lantzmen, Mazel Tov, Mis Amigos. Idelsohn Society for Musical Preservation.
- 2007: "Abie the Fishman: On Masks, Birthmarks, and Hunchbacks". In E. Weisbard (Ed.), Listen Again: A Momentary History of Pop Music (pp. 50–68). Durham, NC and London: Duke University Press.
- 2005: "Bagels, Bongos, and Yiddishe Mambos, or the Other History of Jews in America". Shofar: An Interdisciplinary Journal of Jewish Studies, 23(4), 50–68.
- 2004: "File under: Post-Mexico". Aztlan, 29(1), 271–277.
- 2004: "What Is an MC If He Can't Rap to Banda? Making Music in Nuevo L.A." American Quarterly, 56(3), 741–758.
- 2002: "Two Turntables and a Social Movement: Writing Hip-Hop at Century's End". American Literary History, 14(3), 580–592.
- 2002: Introduction to Papa, Play for Me by Mickey Katz.
- 2000: "The Aural Border". Theatre Journal, 52, 1-21.
