= Skyy (disambiguation) =

Skyy is a brand of vodka.

Skyy may also refer to:

- Alexis Skyy (born 1994), American television personality
- Skyy Moore (born 2000), American football player
- Skyy (band), a former American band
  - Skyy (album), the band's 1979 debut album
- Skyy Radio 106.6FM, a commercial radio station in Sierra Leone

== See also ==
- Sky (disambiguation)
- Skye (disambiguation)
