= Sky Kids (TV channel) =

- Logo used since 2026

- Alternate Logo for UI/EPG, digital and small format spaces.
- Broadcast area: United Kingdom & Ireland

Programming
- Language: English
- Picture format: 1080i HDTV

Ownership
- Owner: Sky Group (Comcast)
- Sister channels: List of Sky UK channels

History
- Launched: 13 February 2023; 3 years ago

Links
- Website: www.sky.com/tv/kids

Sky Kids is a British and Irish children's subscription service owned and operated by the Sky Group, a subsidiary of Comcast and launched on 13 February 2023 as the first in-house Sky-branded children's network.

== History ==
The concept of a Sky-branded children's television channel was first proposed in 1986 as part of Rupert Murdoch's bid to acquire British Satellite Broadcasting, a British direct broadcast satellite company which merged with Sky plc to form British Sky Broadcasting (then Sky Limited, now Sky UK). The Children's Channel was eventually taken up by BSB after a failed attempt to acquire a 50% stake in TCC, Sky launched Fox Kids in 1996. A stake in the channel, which later rebranded in 2004 as Jetix, eventually reduced over time until it was fully acquired by The Walt Disney Company, who renamed the channel Disney XD in 2009. Sky also previously held a 40% stake in the 1993-launched the British venture of Nickelodeon and carried the networks with brand owner MTV Networks International (now Paramount International Networks) having 60% stake.

Prior to the launch of Sky Kids, a Sky Kids Magazine was briefly available for subscribers of Sky Magazine. A Sky Kids app was launched on 30 March 2016 featuring On Demand content specifically for children for Sky customers.

On 31 October 2022, Sky sold their full stake in Nickelodeon UK Ltd. to Paramount Networks UK & Australia; the Nickelodeon agreement had contained a non-compete clause that otherwise restricted Sky and Comcast from launching a children's television network while still holding a stake in Nickelodeon UK Ltd.

On 22 November 2022, Sky UK announced the launch of a linear and commercial-free Sky Kids channel in February the following year.

== Programming ==
Sky Kids airs both original commissions and acquired shows.

Original commissions for the network include the television serial programmes Ready, Eddie, Go! and My Friend Misty, the latter executive produced by Fearne Cotton, animated specials based on the book series Pip and Posy and co-productions such as Funny Talking Animals with BBC Studios Kids & Family. The channel also broadcasts programmes that were already produced for the Sky Kids app such as MC Grammar: Wonder Raps and The Brilliant World of Tom Gates.

Acquired programming on the channel consists of content produced by Comcast-owned DreamWorks Animation such as Trolls: TrollsTopia, Where's Wally?, and Madagascar: A Little Wild. Other programmes on the channel includes content featuring Australian band The Wiggles and The Pingu Show.
