= Skye (name) =

Skye is both a given name and surname.

== Surname ==
- Alexis Skye (born 1974), American model
- Azura Skye, Azura Dawn Storozynski (born 1981), American actress
- Freya Skye (born 2009), English singer-songwriter and actress
- Ione Skye, Ione Skye Lee (born 1970), British-American actress
- Justine Skye (born 1995), American singer
- Obert Skye (born 1970), American children's writer

== Given name ==
- Skye Celine Baker (born 1997), Guamanian beauty pageant titleholder
- Skye Blakely (born 2005), American gymnast
- Skye Blue (born 1999), American professional wrestler
- Skye Bolt (born 1994), American baseball player
- Skye Borgman, American film director and cinematographer
- Skye Chan (born 1983), Hong Kong actress
- Skye Dawson (born 1990), former American football player
- Skye Drynan, American businesswoman and fashion designer
- Skye Edwards (born 1974), often known as Skye, English singer
- Skye-Jilly Edwards (born 1972), Australian fashion model
- Skye Gunn (born 1997), American soccer player
- Skye Gyngell (1963–2025), Australian chef
- Skye Kakoschke-Moore (born 1985), Australian politician
- Skye Lourie (born 1990), New Zealand-British actress
- Skye P. Marshall (born 1981), American film actress
- Skye McCole Bartusiak (1992–2014), American actress and model
- Skye McNiel (born 1978), American politician
- Skye Nicolson (born 1995), Australian boxer
- Skye Patrick, African-American librarian
- Skye Sweetnam (born 1988), Canadian singer
- Skye Townsend (born 1993), African-American actress and singer
- Skye Wallace, Canadian singer-songwriter

== Fictional characters ==
- Skye, a character in Paw Patrol
- Skye, a fictional eagle in Grandia II
- Skye, an alias of Daisy Johnson in Agents of S.H.I.E.L.D.
- Skye, a character from the video game Darkened Skye
- Skye, a champion in Paladins
- Skye, a character in the battle royale game Fortnite, introduced in Chapter 2 Season 2
- Skye Alexandria Tate, a character in Terra Nova
- Skye Chandler Quartermaine, is a fictional character from ABC soap operas
- Skye Masterson, a character from the musical Guys and Dolls
- Skye Miller, a character in the novel and Netflix series 13 Reasons Why
- Skye Nakaiye, a character from The Puzzle Place
- Deirdre Skye, a faction leader in Sid Meier's Alpha Centauri
- Ema and Lana Skye, Ace Attorney characters
- Kirra Foster, codenamed Skye, an agent in Valorant
- Skye, a character from The Summer I Turned Pretty (TV series)
- Skye Riley, the pop-star main character in Smile 2
- Skye, a unicorn in Sofia the First: Mystic Isles subseries.
- Skye Elizabeth Aitken, a character from the film Then Came You

== See also ==
- Skye (disambiguation)
