= Planet Pop (disambiguation) =

Planet Pop is an album by German group ATC.

Planet Pop may also refer to:

- Planet Pop (1, 2, 3...), a series of pop compilation albums by Sony Music Canada
- Planet Pop, a British music television channel now called Now Rock

== See also ==
- For "planetary population", see world population
- Popworld, UK Channel 4 music programme
