= Why Oh Why =

Why Oh Why may refer to:

- "Why Oh Why", a 2020 single by L.A.B.
- "Why Oh Why", a 1997 song by Celine Dion from Let's Talk About Love
- "Why Oh Why", a 2001 song by A Touch of Class from Planet Pop
