= Touch the Sky =

Touch the Sky may refer to:

== Film and television ==
- Touch the Sky (film), a 2007 film
- Touch the Sky, a 2012 documentary starring Guy Laliberté

== Music ==
=== Albums ===
- Touch the Sky (ATC album), 2003
- Touch the Sky (Carole King album), 1979
- Touch the Sky (Smokey Robinson album), 1983
- Touch the Sky EP, an EP by Radical Face

=== Songs ===
- "Touch the Sky" (Cartouche song), 1994
- "Touch the Sky" (Hostyle Gospel song), 2012
- "Touch the Sky" (Julie Fowlis song), 2012
- "Touch the Sky" (Kanye West song), 2006
- "Touch the Sky" (Sean Paul song), 2012
- "Touch the Sky", a song by Cedric Gervais featuring Digital Farm Animals and Dallas Austin, 2017
- "Touch the Sky", a song by Hillsong United from the 2015 album Empires
- "Touch the Sky", a song by Julian Lennon from the 2011 album Everything Changes
- "Touch the Sky", a song by Smokey Robinson from the 1983 album of the same name
- "Touch the Sky", a 2018 song by NEFFEX

== See also ==
- Let's Touch the Sky, 2010 album of the jazz group Fourplay
- Reach Up and Touch the Sky, 1981 double live album by Southside Johnny & The Asbury Jukes
- "Touching the Sky", 2024 song by Rauw Alejandro
