= A Touch of Class (group) =

Germany-based Eurodance group (1997–2003)

- Original lineup in February 2001 (From left to right: Tracey Elizabeth Packham, Joseph "Joey" Murray, Livio Salvi, and Sarah Egglestone)

Background information
- Also known as: ATC
- Origin: Hamburg, Germany
- Genre: Eurodance
- Years active: 1997–2003
- Past members: Joseph "Joey" Murray; Sarah Egglestone; Tracey Elizabeth Packham; Livio Salvi

A Touch of Class (often shortened in initials as ATC) were an international Eurodance group based in Germany. The pop group was active from 1997 and their most successful release was "Around the World (La La La La La)", released in 2000. The group disbanded at the end of 2003.

== Career ==
Logo

The original members of ATC each came from different countries—Joseph "Joey" Murray from New Zealand, Sarah Egglestone from Australia, Livio Salvi from Italy, and Tracey Elizabeth Packham from England. The four met in Hamburg, Germany, as cast members of the international Broadway theatre German production of the stage musical Cats from October 1997 to April 1998. Egglestone played Bombalurina, Salvi played Mungojerrie, Packham played Syllabub, and Murray played as Munkustrap/swing dancer. The four quickly became friends and decided to form a dance group together.

The group was active from as early as 1997. Egglestone noted, "We were there sitting watching television one day, seeing groups and saying 'there's no reason [...] why we can't do this.'" The group first met with producers Alex Christensen and Thomas M. Stein in 1999 and began working on material under the name ATC. The group experimented with merging male and female vocals together. "Producers don't seem to want to mix the voices so often [...] that helps give us that little bit of an edge," Murray remarked.

Their first single, "Around the World (La La La La La)" (which was an English cover of the song "Pesenka" by the Russian group Ruki Vverh!) was first released on 1 April 2000 and went number one in Germany for six weeks in summer 2000. In the United States, the song peaked at number 28, and in the United Kingdom, it peaked at number 15. Their debut album Planet Pop, featuring songs from Alex Christensen and Clyde Ward, was released on 6 February 2001 by King Size (BMG Entertainment) and Republic (Universal Music), for which they were awarded an ECHO for Best Dance Act.

In 2001, the group released the single "I'm in Heaven (When You Kiss Me)", which was moderately successful in parts of Europe. In 2002, "Set Me Free" was released as a single but was not successful. In 2003, German DJ and producer ATB successfully took the band's record label to court, and the band was forced to formally drop the ATC initials. Following the name change, the group released a final single, "New York City", and their second album, Touch the Sky in 2003, but they did not match the success of their previous records and the group disbanded as the members decided to go their separate ways.

== Post-disbandment ==
The band members all pursue different activities post-disbandment; Egglestone runs a pilates studio in Australia, and Packham works as a carer. Murray and Salvi would together form a cover band, Démodé Trio, with Yvette Robinson in 2016.

In 2019, Dutch-Moroccan DJ R3hab remade All Around the World (La La La), crediting ATC and collaborating with the group to make the remixed version. In 2021, American singer-songwriter Ava Max interpolated the song in her single "My Head & My Heart".

In 2020, the original 4 members of the band reunited for a photo, while hinting that the band could reunite for the sake of performing for 90s music festivals. The group was intending to reunite for a tour before the outbreak of COVID-19.

== Discography ==
=== Albums ===
Title	Album details
Planet Pop	Released: 6 November 2000 (Int.) 6 February 2001 (US); Label: Republic/Universal (formerly; US), King Size/BMG (currently; worldwide); Formats: CD, Audio Cassette
Touch the Sky	Released: 23 March 2003; Label: King Size/BMG; Formats: CD, digital download

=== Singles ===
List of singles, with selected chart positions and certifications, showing year released and originating album
Single	Year	Peak chart positions													Certifications (sales thresholds)	Album
Single	Year	AUS	AUT	BEL	FIN	FRA	GER	IT	NED	POL	SWE	SWI	UK	US	Certifications (sales thresholds)	Album
"Around the World (La La La La La)"	2000	11	1	10	7	12	1	16	5	1	8	1	15	28	GER: Platinum; AUT: Gold; SWI: Gold; FRA: Silver	Planet Pop
"My Heart Beats Like a Drum (Dum Dum Dum)"	2000	76	6	11	12	39	3	46	37	18	38	21	—	—	GER: Gold	Planet Pop
"Thinking of You"	2000	—	—	—	—	—	46	—	—	—	—	51	—	—		Planet Pop
"Why Oh Why"	2001	—	16	39	—	—	16	—	—	29	—	64	—	—		Planet Pop
"I'm in Heaven (When You Kiss Me)"	2001	—	27	—	—	—	22	—	—	—	—	31	—	—		Touch the Sky
"Set Me Free"	2002	—	—	—	—	—	44	—	—	—	—	—	—	—		Touch the Sky
"Call on Me"	2002	—	—	—	—	—	—	—	—	—	—	—	—	—		Touch the Sky
"New York City"	2003	—	—	—	—	—	81	—	—	—	—	—	—	—		Touch the Sky
"All Around the World (La La La)" (with R3hab)	2019	—	35	11	10	63	29	—	18	—	62	39	—	—	SWI: Platinum	Non-album single
"—" denotes a recording that did not chart or was not released in that territory.
