= Skye (disambiguation) =

Skye is the largest island in the Inner Hebrides of Scotland.

Skye or Isle of Skye may also refer to:

== Places ==
- Skye (Charlotte), a skyscraper in Charlotte, North Carolina, United States
- Skye, Ontario, a community of The Nation, Canada
- Skye, South Australia, an eastern suburb of Adelaide
- Skye, Victoria, a suburb in Melbourne, Australia
- Skye of Curr, a hamlet near Grantown-on-Spey, Highland, Scotland
- Isle of Skye, a former name for Newham, Victoria, Australia
- Isle of Skye, a moorland location and former pub near the head of the Wessenden Valley in West Yorkshire, England
- Isle of Skye, Ontario, Canada, an island in Lake Muskoka, Ottawa
- Broadford Airfield, Scotland

== People and fictional characters ==
- Skye (name), a list of people or fictional characters with the surname or given name
- Vicky Swain (born 1985), often known as Skye, former British professional wrestler

== Other uses ==
- Isle of Skye: From Chieftain to King, a board game
- Operation Skye, code name for the radio component of an Allied military deception in World War II
- Skye Bank, a commercial bank based in Nigeria
- Skye Records, a former music label

== See also ==
- Sky (disambiguation)
- Skyy (disambiguation)
