= Spy Kids (disambiguation) =

Spy Kids is an American media franchise created by Robert Rodriguez.

Spy Kids may also refer to:

- Spy Kids (film), a 2001 American action comedy film
- Spy Kids: Mission Critical, a 2018 animated television series

== See also ==
- Sky Kids (disambiguation)
