= My Heart Beats Like a Drum (Dum Dum Dum) =

2000 single by A Touch of Class

Single by A Touch of Class

from the album Planet Pop
- Released: 2 September 2000
- Length: 3:43
- Label: Kingsize
- Songwriters: Alex Christensen; Peter Könemann
- Producer: Alex Christensen

A Touch of Class singles chronology
| "Around the World (La La La La La)" (2000) | "My Heart Beats Like a Drum (Dum Dum Dum)" (2000) | "Thinking of You" (2000) |

Music video
- "My Heart Beats Like a Drum (Dum Dum Dum)" on YouTube

"My Heart Beats Like a Drum (Dum Dum Dum)", originally released and also known as "My Heart Beats Like a Drum (Dam Dam Dam)", is the second single by German Eurodance group A Touch of Class from their debut album Planet Pop. While not as successful as "Around the World (La La La La La)", it was still a Top 10 hit in several countries across Europe.

== Background ==
"My Heart Beats Like a Drum" was released after the success of "Around the World (La La La La La)" and was produced by the same producers, Alex Christensen and Peter Könemann. It was first available in Europe on 2 September 2000, and had multiple Top 40 peaks across the continent. Despite the single's moderate success, it never surpassed the peak positions of "Around The World (La La La La La)" in any country.

The single was first released with the title "My Heart Beats Like a Drum (Dam Dam Dam)" in Europe, but was released under the title "My Heart Beats Like a Drum (Dum Dum Dum)" in North America and Australia.

== Music video ==
A music video for the song was released on the same day as the audio release. It features the four original singers, Tracey, Joey, Sarah and Livio in a room with red, blue, green, walls, and windows, the latter of which has a zebra print on one side with a purple ceiling. The members of ATC are seen mostly dancing in gold shining clothes. Every time the "Dum Dum Dum" hook is sung, the members first raise their arms above their heads, then lower them to their torso, and finally lower them to their thighs. The scenes without the choreography show two of the singers walking on the ceilings (done via rotating the camera upside down), with the last minute of the video having all four band members dance upside down on the purple ceiling.

== Track listings ==
CD single

1. "My Heart Beats Like a Drum (Dam Dam Dam)" (radio edit)
2. "My Heart Beats Like a Drum (Dam Dam Dam)" (extended club mix)

German CD maxi-single

1. "My Heart Beats Like a Drum" (radio edit)
2. "My Heart Beats Like a Drum" (extended club mix)
3. "My Heart Beats Like a Drum" (Rüegsegger#wittwer Clubremix)
4. "My Heart Beats Like a Drum" (Triple X extended remix)
5. "My Heart Beats Like a Drum" (Rüegsegger#wittwer Frantic remix)
6. "My Heart Beats Like a Drum" (Triple X Dub Attack)

== Charts ==
=== Weekly charts ===
Weekly chart performance for "My Heart Beats Like a Drum (Dum Dum Dum)
| Chart (2000–2001) | Peak position |
|---|---|
| Australia (ARIA) | 76 |
| Austria (Ö3 Austria Top 40) | 6 |
| Belgium (Ultratop 50 Flanders) | 11 |
| Belgium (Ultratip Bubbling Under Wallonia) | 3 |
| Denmark (IFPI) | 13 |
| Europe (Eurochart Hot 100) | 20 |
| Finland (Suomen virallinen lista) | 12 |
| France (SNEP) | 39 |
| Germany (GfK) | 3 |
| Italy (FIMI) | 46 |
| Netherlands (Dutch Top 40) | 34 |
| Netherlands (Single Top 100) | 37 |
| Romania (Romanian Top 100) | 3 |
| Sweden (Sverigetopplistan) | 38 |
| Switzerland (Schweizer Hitparade) | 21 |

=== Year-end charts ===
Year-end chart performance for "My Heart Beats Like a Drum (Dum Dum Dum)"
| Chart (2000) | Position |
|---|---|
| Europe Border Breakers (Music & Media) | 65 |
| Germany (Media Control) | 41 |
| Romania (Romanian Top 100) | 33 |
| Switzerland (Schweizer Hitparade) | 88 |

== Release history ==
Release dates and formats for "My Heart Beats Like a Drum (Dum Dum Dum)"
| Region | Date | Format(s) | Label(s) | Ref. |
|---|---|---|---|---|
| Germany | 2 September 2000 | 12-inch vinyl; CD | King Size | |
| Finland | 25 September 2000 | CD | King Size | |
| Sweden | 25 September 2000 | CD | King Size | |
