= I'm in Heaven (When You Kiss Me) =

Single by A Touch of Class

from the album Touch the Sky
- Released: July 21, 2001
- Length: 3:51
- Label: King Size; BMG
- Songwriters: Alex Joerge Christensen, Peter Koenemann, Jane Ward
- Producer: Alex Christensen

A Touch of Class singles chronology
"Why Oh Why" (2001)	"I'm in Heaven (When You Kiss Me)" (2001)	"Set Me Free" (2002)

Music video
- "I'm in Heaven (When You Kiss Me)" on YouTube

"I'm in Heaven (When You Kiss Me)" is a song by Eurodance group A Touch of Class. It was released in July 2001 as the lead single from their second album Touch the Sky. The single charted in the Top 40's in Germany, Austria, Switzerland, and Romania.

== Music video ==
The music video starts out with a group of people looking up onto the night sky and spotting a luminous beam of light. It later zooms into a barren foreign planet where ATC are sitting and looking up into the sky. The group then stands up and walks through a grasslands, ending up in front of a tree full of bubbles instead of leaves, which they all later get trapped inside of. They all start floating up high into the sky inside of their respective bubbles, hence the album's name, Touch the Sky. They all then manage to escape the bubbles and land back onto the grasslands. The group then arrives in a winter setting where they ride unicorns and later spout angel wings, then proceed to fly up into outer space. Whilst flying through outer space, they land on a flying stingray and dance on top of it. They are later sent back to the grasslands from earlier, and now continue to dance with the group of people seen at the very beginning. Later, only the group of people are warped back to planet Earth, dubbed as "wonderland", leaving ATC in outer space, with one girl having a necklace that glows up as a gift from ATC.

== Track listing ==
CD maxi - Europe (2001)

1. "I'm in Heaven (When You Kiss Me)" (Radio Edit 5 Inch-Version) - 3:47
2. "I'm in Heaven (When You Kiss Me)" (Radio Edit 12 Inch-Version) - 4:36
3. "I'm in Heaven (When You Kiss Me)" (Record Rescue @ Blue PM Mix) - 4:16
4. "I'm in Heaven (When You Kiss Me)" (BKA 2 Blue PM Mix) - 3:55
5. "I'm in Heaven (When You Kiss Me)" (Disco Mix) - 3:50
6. "I'm in Heaven (When You Kiss Me)" (Trance Ibiza Space Mix) - 5:51
7. "I'm in Heaven (When You Kiss Me)" (Club Pop Mix) - 4:26

== Charts ==
Chart (2001–02)	Peak position
Austria (Ö3 Austria Top 40)	27
Germany (GfK)	22
Romania (Romanian Top 100)	18
Switzerland (Schweizer Hitparade)	31
