= Rod McKuen discography =

American poet, singer-songwriter and actor

Rod McKuen was an American poet, singer-songwriter, and actor.

== Albums ==
Year	Album	Type	Notes
1956	Songs For A Lazy Afternoon	Studio	debut album, according to Billboard; McKuen's official website places this as his second album
1958	Lonely Summer	Studio	debut album released in 1955, according to McKuen's official website; Billboard places this as his second album, released in 1958
1958	Time Of Desire	Studio	spoken word album
1959	Beatsville	Studio	spoken word album
1959	Anywhere I Wander	Studio	vocal album
1960	Alone After Dark	Studio	vocal album
1960	Written In the Stars (The Zodiac Suite)	Studio	astrology-themed instrumental album composed by McKuen, conducted by Dick Jacobs
1961	Stranger In Town	Studio	vocal album
1961	In Search Of Eros	Studio	spoken word album
1962	Mr. Oliver Twist	Studio	vocal album
1963	New Sounds In Folk Music	Studio	vocal album
1964	There's a Hoot Tonight (with the Horizon Singers)	Studio	vocal album
1964	Sings Rod McKuen	Studio	vocal album
1964	Seasons In the Sun	Studio	vocal album
1964	Rod McKuen	Reissue	UK version of "There's a Hoot Tonight"; omits four tracks and adds one by the Sherwood Singers
1964	Sings Folk	Reissue	alternate UK version of "There's A Hoot Tonight"; omits four tracks (different from the above reissue)
1965	In Concert	Live	compiles various live performances from the US, UK, and France
1965	Prolific Composer Sings His Own	Studio	vocal album
1965	Got To Roam	Reissue	UK version of "New Sounds In Folk Music"; omits two tracks
1966	The Loner	Studio	vocal album
1966	Other Kinds Of Songs	Studio	vocal album
1967	The Sea	Studio	mood music with spoken word by Jesse Pearson; written by McKuen, composed by Anita Kerr, performed by The San Sebastian Strings
1967	Through European Windows	Studio	vocal album
1967	The Earth	Studio	mood music with spoken word by McKuen; written by McKuen, composed by Anita Kerr, performed by The San Sebastian Strings
1967	Listen To The Warm	Studio	spoken word/vocal album
1967	Seasons In The Sun, 2	Studio	vocal album
1967	The Sea/The Earth/The Sky	Compilation	3-record set compiling "The Sea" and "The Earth" by The San Sebastian Strings, as well as the previously unreleased "The Sky"
1967	The Love Movement	Studio	vocal/instrumental album performed by various artists; written, composed, and produced by McKuen
1967	The Sea	Studio	Japanese-language version of "The Sea: with narration by Koji Ishizaka
1967	The Earth	Studio	Japanese-language version of "The Earth" with narration by Koji Ishizaka
1968	The Sky	Studio	mood music with spoken word by Gene Merlino; written by McKuen, composed by Anita Kerr, performed by The San Sebastian Strings
1968	Home To The Sea	Studio	mood music with spoken word by Jesse Pearson; written by Rod, composed by Anita Kerr, performed by The San Sebastian Strings
1968	The Beautiful Strangers	Studio	vocal album
1968	Rod McKuen’s Something Beyond	Studio	instrumental album, credited to “The Orchestra Of Two Worlds”
1968	The Rod McKuen Folk Album	Compilation	folk-themed compilation album, including new songs
1968	Blessings In Shades Of Green	Studio	vocal album
1968	Joanna: Original Motion Picture Soundtrack	Studio	instrumental and vocal soundtrack from the film Joanna
1968	The Single Man	Studio	vocal album
1968	Lonesome Cities	Studio	spoken word album; winner of the Grammy Award for Best Spoken Word Recording of 1968
1968	Concerto No. 1 For Four Harpsichords And Orchestra/Four Statements From Three Books	Studio	classical album, conducted by Arthur Greenslade and performed by The London Arte Orchestra
1968	Very Warm	Reissue	re-release of Alone After Dark; omits 4 tracks and adds 2 new tracks
1968	Bits And Pieces	Compilation	contains tracks from Anywhere I Wander and Lonely Summer, along with 4 uncollected tracks
1968	Takes A San Francisco Hippie Trip	Reissue	retitled, edited for content, and resequenced version of Beatsville
1968	About Me	Reissue	contains tracks from Time Of Desire, some of them edited with new titles
1968	Desire Has No Special Time	Reissue	re-release of Time Of Desire, omits 1 track
1968	Life Is	Reissue	re-release of Beatsville
1968	The Sky	Studio	Japanese-language version of The Sky with narration by Koji Ishizaka
1968	Home To The Sea	Studio	Japanese-language version of Home To the Sea with narration by Koji Ishizaka
1969	Greatest Hits Of Rod McKuen	Studio	new recordings of McKuen's best-known songs up to that point; 1996 CD reissue adds 6 additional tracks
1969	The Prime Of Miss Jean Brodie (Original Motion Picture Soundtrack)	Studio	instrumental and vocal soundtrack from the film “The Prime of Miss Jean Brodie”; contains 19 tracks
1969	The Prime Of Miss Jean Brodie (Original Motion Picture Score)	Studio	instrumental and vocal songs from the film “The Prime of Miss Jean Brodie” with The Cinema Sound Stage Orchestra; contains 15 tracks
1969	The Best Of Rod McKuen	Compilation	collects previously released songs from his six RCA studio albums
1969	Me, Natalie (Original Sound Track Recording)	Studio	instrumental and vocal soundtrack from the film “Me, Natalie”; lyrics by Rod, music composed & conducted by Henry Mancini
1969	Rod McKuen At Carnegie Hall	Live	recorded in live performance at Carnegie Hall on April 29, 1969
1969	(...The Sun Shines Down For Everybody But Especially) For Lovers	Studio	mood music with spoken word by Joey Benson; written by Rod, composed by Anita Kerr, performed by The San Sebastian Strings
1969	The Complete Sea	Compilation	3-record set compiling The Sea and Home To The Sea by The San Sebastian Strings, as well as the previously unreleased The Soft Sea
1969	The Sounds Of Day, The Sounds Of Night	Reissue	re-release of Time Of Desire; omits 6 tracks and adds 3 tracks from Beatsville
1969	Il Mare	Studio	Italian-language version of The Sea with narration by Arnoldo Foà
1970	New Ballads	Studio	vocal album
1970	The Prime Of Miss Jean Brodie	Studio	instrumental and vocal songs from the film “The Prime of Miss Jean Brodie”; contains 12 tracks
1970	Love’s Been Good To Me	Studio	vocal album
1970	A Boy Named Charlie Brown: Selections From The Soundtrack	Studio	book-and-record format; from the film A Boy Named Charlie Brown; music and lyrics by McKuen
1970	Live In London!	Live	recorded in live performance at the London Palladium on May 23, 1970; 2008 CD/digital reissue adds 15 live bonus tracks
1970	Symphony No. 1 “All Men Love Something”	Studio	classical album, conducted by Arthur Greenslade and performed by The Westminster Symphony Orchestra
1970	The Soft Sea	Studio	mood music with spoken word by Jesse Pearson; written by Rod, composed by Anita Kerr, performed by The San Sebastian Strings
1970	A Boy Named Charlie Brown	Studio	instrumental and vocal selections from the films A Boy Named Charlie Brown, The Prime Of Miss Jean Brodie, Me, Natalie, and Joanna
1970	Rod McKuen's Greatest Hits 2	Compilation	collects previously released songs with newly recorded versions; 1996 CD reissue adds 6 additional tracks
1970	Try Rod McKuen In The Privacy Of Your Own Home	Compilation	collects previously released studio and live tracks with newly recorded songs
1970	So My Sheep May Safely Graze	Studio	Christmas-themed vocal album
1970	Concerto No. 2 For Guitar & Orchestra/Five Pieces For Orchestra	Studio	classical album, conducted by Arthur Greenslade and performed by The Symphony de Madrid & The London Arte Orchestra
1970	In The Beginning...	Compilation	collects previously released tracks from Songs For A Lazy Afternoon and The Yellow Unicorn; the 2015 CD/digital reissue includes an additional 17 tracks from the 1955-1961 period
1970	Love’s Been Good To Me	Reissue	re-release of Sings Rod McKuen; omits 3 tracks; this is a completely different release from the identically titled studio album also released in 1970
1970	The World Of Rod McKuen	Compilation	Japan-only release
1970	La Mer	Studio	French-language version of The Sea with narration by Marc Ogeret
1970	The Body Electric - 1	Studio	spoken word album; music by Rod, words by Walt Whitman, spoken by Jesse Pearson
1970	The Body Electric - 2	Studio	spoken word album; music by Rod, words by Walt Whitman, spoken by Jesse Pearson
1970	Classical Compositions	Compilation	compiles three classical releases in their entirety: Symphony No. 1, Concerto No. 1, and Concerto No. 2
1971	Pastorale	Studio	vocal album
1971	Scandalous John: The Original Sound Track Album	Studio	instrumental and vocal soundtrack from the film Scandalous John; composed & performed by Rod
1971	The Rod McKuen Show	Studio	UK-only vocal album; selections from Rod's BBC television series featuring The Stanyan Strings
1971	Grand Tour	Live	double LP recorded at various locations during Rod's 1971 concert tour
1971	An Evening In Vienna (with Greta Keller)	Live	recorded live in the Brahms-Saal, Vienna, June 4, 1971; Rod produced the album, but sings on Side B only (Side A is Greta Keller)
1971	New Carols For Christmas	Reissue	re-release of “So My Sheep May Safely Graze”; omits 2 tracks, adds 3 new tracks
1971	The Poetry That Is	Reissue	re-release of “In Search Of Eros”
1972	The Amsterdam Concert	Live	recorded in live performance at Concertgebouw on October 15, 1971; 2006 CD/digital reissue adds 12 live bonus tracks
1972	McKuen Conducts McKuen	Studio	instrumental album, Ron conducts The Westminster Symphony Orchestra & Members of the Paris Conservatory Orchestra
1972	Grand Tour (Vol. 3)	Live	recorded at various locations during Rod's 1971 concert tour; titled “Vol. 3” because the preceding “Grand Tour” album was a double LP
1972	The Word	Live	spoken word performances recorded at Carnegie Hall and The Wilshire Ebell Theatre
1972	Pastures Green	Compilation	collects previously released and unreleased tracks from the 1965-1971 period
1972	Seasons In The Sun Vol. 1 & 2	Compilation	2-record set compiling “Seasons In The Sun” and “Seasons In The Sun, 2”
1972	Greatest Hits Vol. 3	Compilation	collects previously released live and studio tracks; 1996 CD reissue adds 6 additional tracks
1972	Have A Nice Day	Compilation	collects previously released tracks along with several new songs
1972	Odyssey	Studio	vocal album
1972	Rod	Studio	vocal album
1972	A Portrait Of Rod McKuen (with The Stanyan Strings)	Compilation	collects previously released tracks along with several new songs
1972	Two Against The Morning (with Liesbeth List)	Studio	Netherlands-only release; vocal album featuring Rod solo songs, Liesbeth List solo songs, and duets between the two
1972	Winter	Studio	mood music with spoken word by Rod; written by Rod, composed by Anita Kerr, performed by The San Sebastian Strings
1972	Sings Jacques Brel	Compilation	collects previously released tracks along with several new songs, all written or co-written by Jacques Brel
1972	Listen To The Warm	Reissue	re-release of the original spoken word/vocal album; includes the 15 previously unreleased tracks from the original “Listen To The Warm” recording sessions
1972	Concerto No. 3 For Piano & Orchestra	Studio	classical album, conducted by Arthur Greenslade and performed by Westminster Philharmonic Orchestra
1972	Soldiers Who Want To Be Heroes...	Compilation	Netherlands-only release, collects previously released live and studio tracks
1972	In A Lonely Place	Reissue	re-release of “Stranger In Town”
1972	The Sounds Of Day, The Sounds Of Night/About Me	Compilation	2-record set compiling the reissues “The Sounds Of Day, The Sounds Of Night” and “About Me”; the title on the record jacket only says “About Me”
1972	Rod McKuen	Compilation	Japan-only double LP release
1972	Greatest Hits, Vol. 4	Compilation	collects previously released live and studio tracks; 1973 US version removes 4 tracks from the original Dutch version and adds 5 tracks; 1996 CD reissue adds 6 additional tracks
1973	Summer	Studio	mood music with spoken word by Rod; written by Rod, composed by Anita Kerr, performed by The San Sebastian Strings
1973	Greatest Hits!	Compilation	UK-only release, collects previously released live and studio tracks
1973	Piano Variations/Riders In The Distance...	Studio	classical album, conducted by Dick Walter and performed by Niew Amsterdam Chamber Orchestra
1973	Back To Carnegie Hall (With The Stanyan Strings)	Live	double LP recorded in live performance at Carnegie Hall in 1973; includes a “bonus performance” of “Opus 40/Ballad Of Distances” with The Edmonton Symphony Orchestra
1973	Cycles	Compilation	collects previously released tracks along with several new songs
1973	The City/I Hear America Singing	Studio	classical album with narration by Rod; composed by Rod, conducted by Jorge Mester and performed by The Louisville Orchestra
1973	Lisa, Bright And Dark (Music From The Original Soundtrack)	Studio	instrumental and vocal soundtrack from the film; vocal tracks performed by Rod, instrumental tracks performed by Billy Byers And His Orchestra
1973	The Borrowers (Music From The Original Soundtrack)	Studio	instrumental and vocal soundtrack from the film; music & lyrics by Rod
1973	The Seasons	Compilation	4-record set compiling the previously released albums “Winter” and “Summer” by The San Sebastian Strings, as well as the unreleased albums “Spring” and “Autumn”; “Spring” received a separate promotional release
1973	De Zee	Studio	Dutch-language version of “The Sea” with narration by Hans Pauwels
1974	Bouquet: The Best Of The San Sebastian Strings	Compilation	contains selections from all the Rod McKuen/Anita Kerr/San Sebastian Strings collaborations up to that point
1974	Seasons In The Sun	Reissue	re-release of “Sings Jacques Brel”; omits 3 tracks; this release is unrelated to “Seasons In The Sun” (1964) or “Seasons In The Sun, 2” (1967)
1974	Love Songs	Compilation	double LP collects previously released tracks
1974	Alone...	Studio	vocal album
1974	Live At The Sydney Opera House	Live	musical direction by Gene Palumbo; contains 22 tracks
1975	With Love	Studio	mood music with spoken word by Rod; written by Rod, composed by Anita Kerr, performed by The San Sebastian Strings
1975	Goodtime Music	Studio	vocal album
1975	The Rod McKuen Christmas Album	Reissue	re-release of “New Carols For Christmas”
1975	Sleep Warm	Studio	vocal album; truncated US/UK/Canada version with 14 tracks
1975	Live At The Sydney Opera House	Live	recorded live at the Sydney Opera House in November 1975 and during Rod's 1975 tour of Australia; this is a different release from the identically titled 1974 live album
1975	Sleep Warm	Studio	vocal album; double LP Australia version with 22 tracks and different cover
1975	The Essential Rod McKuen, Vol. 1	Compilation	3-record set compiling the previously released album “Listen To The Warm” with the unreleased albums “Moment To Moment” and “Stanyan Street And Other Sorrows”
1975	Plains Of My Country/Seascapes	Studio	classical album, conducted by Arthur Greenslade and performed by The Westminster Philharmonic Orchestra, The Hollywood Wind Ensemble, and Skip Redwine
1975	The Concert Collection: South Africa	Live	double LP
1975	The Concert Collection	Live	version of “The Concert Collection: South Africa” that only contains LP1 of the double LP set; the LP label says “A Concert Collection”
1975	In Person...A South African Souvenir	Live	collects various live performances
1976	Concerto For Cello And Orchestra	Studio	classical album, conducted by Patric Standford and performed by National Philharmonic Orchestra, Keith Harvey, and Music For Strings
1976	McKuen Country	Studio	vocal album
1976	Emily (The Complete Score)	Studio	instrumental and vocal soundtrack from the film “Emily”
1977	The Best Of Rod McKuen: The Early Years	Compilation	South Africa-only release collects previously released songs from the 1964-1970 era
1977	Rod McKuen `77	Studio/Live	vocal album with live performances and studio tracks
1977	More Rod `77	Studio	vocal album; credited to “Rod McKuen & Friends” and includes several duets with other artists
1977	Concerto For Balloon & Orchestra And Three Overtures	Studio	classical album, conducted by Arthur Greenslade and performed by National Philharmonic Orchestra and Tony Hymas; LP label says “Concerto For Synthesizer & Orchestra” on both sides
1977	Slide...Easy In	Studio	vocal album; in contrast with the LP label, the LP sleeve says “Slide Easy In...”; the arm on the album cover belongs to gay porn star Bruno; Rod's name does not appear on the album cover of the US edition
1977	Amor, Amor	Reissue	alternate non-US version of “Slide...Easy In” that features Rod's name on the album cover; some releases say “Slide...Easy In” on the LP label, some feature it on the LP cover along with the “Amor, Amor” title, and others call the album simply “Amor”; album cover in some countries features a female model or a closeup of lips, while other countries retain the original release's cover
1978	On The Move With Slide	Studio	vocal album; credited to “Rod McKuen & Friends” and includes several duets with other artists
1978	The Black Eagle (The Original Cast Recording)	Studio	double LP concept vocal album for unproduced musical; Rod sings the part of “Miguel”
1978	The Unknown War	Studio	instrumental and vocal soundtrack from the film; performed by USSR Bolshoi Symphony Orchestra, USSR Cinema Symphony Orchestra, and London Royal Philharmonic Orchestra; vocals performed by Rod & The Soviet Army Choir; 2011 CD reissue adds 30 bonus tracks
1978	For Friends And Lovers	Compilation	collects previously released studio tracks from the 1970s era with newly recorded songs
1979	Roads	Studio	vocal album
1980	Turntable	Studio	vocal album
1980	Without A Worry In The World	Compilation	Australia-only release collects the title track, 8 tracks from "Roads," and 4 tracks from "Turntable"
1980	Rod McKuen	Compilation	Brazil-only release collects previously released songs from the 1970s era
1981	Global	Studio	vocal album
1981	Someone To Watch Over Me	Studio	vocal album
1981	Love Songs	Compilation	Australia-only release collects previously released tracks; this is a different release from the identically titled double LP compilation released in 1974
1981	The Rod McKuen Collection	Reissue	re-release of “In Search Of Eros”
1981	Rod On Record	Compilation	collects previously released tracks from the 1970s era with unreleased songs
1982	After Midnight	Studio	vocal album
1982	Live Across Australia And Around The World	Live	recorded during Rod's 1981/1982 concert tour of Australia, New Zealand, Brazil, France, Monaco, Austria, Germany, USSR, Ireland, and US; musical direction by Arthur Greenslade
1982	Greatest Hits!	Compilation	Australia-only release collects previously released songs
1984	Pushing The Clouds Away	Compilation	collects previously released spoken word tracks along with several new songs
1988	Concertoworks	Compilation	collects music from the albums “Concerto No. 1 For Guitar & Orchestra/Five Pieces For Orchestra”, “Concerto For Cello And Orchestra”, and “Concerto For Balloon & Orchestra And Three Overtures”
1992	Greatest Hits: Without A Worry In The World	Compilation	Netherlands-only release; collects previously released tracks
1994	At The Movies	Compilation	collects previously released and unreleased vocal tracks from Rod's movie soundtrack contributions
1994	Early Harvest	Compilation	collects previously released and unreleased vocal tracks from Rod's early recording period
1994	Speaking Of Love	Compilation	collects previously released and unreleased spoken word tracks
1994	The French Connection	Compilation	collects previously released and unreleased vocal tracks in French or related to other French musicians
1994	The Rod McKuen Collection 1956-1994	Compilation	this 5-disc set collects “At The Movies”, “Early Harvest”, “Speaking Of Love”, “The French Connection”, and “At Carnegie Hall”
1996	The Greatest Hits Collection	Compilation	this 5-disc set collects the CD reissues of “Greatest Hits, Vol. 1”, “Greatest Hits, Vol. 2”, “Greatest Hits, Vol. 3”, “Greatest Hits, Vol. 4”, and “Lonesome Cities”; each of the “Greatest Hits” CDs contains 6 extra tracks
2002	A Safe Place To Land	Studio	spoken word album; 2-disc set packaged with the poetry book of the same name by Rod
2007	If You Go Away: The RCA Years 1965-1970	Compilation	this 7-disc set collects the complete albums of “Prolific Composer Sings His Own”, “The Loner”, “Other Kinds Of Songs”, “Through European Windows”, “Listen To The Warm” (1972 reissue), and “The Single Man”, as well as demos, alternate takes, and unreleased tracks; 193 tracks in total
2008	Dear Lady Twist	Reissue	digital re-release of “Mr. Oliver Twist”
2009	The Platinum Collection	Compilation	2-disc Korea-only release; collects previously released studio and live tracks
2009	The Hits	Reissue	Netherlands-only re-release of “Greatest Hits: Without A Worry In The World”
2012	Hey Baby	Reissue	digital re-release of “Mr. Oliver Twist”
2012	Seasons In The Sun: Rod McKuen	Reissue	digital re-release of the “There's A Hoot Tonight” album; replaces the song “There's A Hoot Tonight” with “Seasons In The Sun”
2012	The Very Best Of	Reissue	re-release of the 20-track CD version of “Greatest Hits, Vol. 1”
2014	Umi, Sora, Daichi	Compilation	CD set compiling the Japanese-language versions of “The Sea,” “The Earth,” and “The Sky” by The San Sebastian Strings.
2015	Reflections	Compilation	collects previously released tracks from the 1964-1971 period
2015	Live	Live	digital-only release; origin of tracks is unknown
2016	One By One	Reissue	digital re-release of “Sings Rod McKuen”
2016	60 Timeless Songs	Compilation	download-only release collects the complete albums “Anywhere I Wander”, “Alone After Dark”, and “Stranger In Town”, most of the albums “Songs For A Lazy Afternoon” and “Bits And Pieces”, Rod's contributions to the “Rock, Pretty Baby” and “Summer Love” soundtracks, and Rod's hit single “Oliver Twist” with its b-side “Celebrity Twist”
2017	Twistin’	Reissue	re-release of “Mr. Oliver Twist”
2017	A Boy Named Charlie Brown: Original Motion Picture Soundtrack	Soundtrack	instrumental and vocal selections from A Boy Named Charlie Brown (1970); music and lyrics by McKuen
2020	The Space Age Collection: Exotica, Vol. 19	Reissue	digital re-release of “Beatsville” and the entire “The Yellow Unicorn” album, including tracks by other artists
2020	Les Idoles De La Musique Américaine: Rod McKuen, Vol. 1	Reissue	digital re-release of “Anywhere I Wander” and “Songs For A Lazy Afternoon”
2020	Les Idoles De La Musique Américaine: Rod McKuen, Vol. 2	Reissue	digital re-release of “Mr. Oliver Twist”
2020	Tribute to Rod McKuen, Vol. 1	Reissue	digital re-release of “Anywhere I Wander” and “Songs For A Lazy Afternoon”
2020	Tribute to Rod McKuen, Vol. 2	Reissue	digital re-release of “Mr. Oliver Twist”
2020	The Selection	Reissue	digital re-release of “Anywhere I Wander” and “Songs For A Lazy Afternoon”
2020	The Poet Of Music	Reissue	digital re-release of “Beatsville”; includes 5 bonus tracks
2020	Best Collection	Reissue	digital re-release of “Anywhere I Wander” and “Songs For A Lazy Afternoon”
2021	All The Best	Reissue	digital re-release of “Anywhere I Wander” and “Songs For A Lazy Afternoon”
2021	Blowin' In The Wind	Reissue	digital re-release of the “There's A Hoot Tonight” album; replaces the song “There's A Hoot Tonight” with “Seasons In The Sun”
2021	Lazy Afternoon	Reissue	digital re-release of “Anywhere I Wander” and “Songs For A Lazy Afternoon”
2021	That Lucky Old Sun	Reissue	digital re-release of “Anywhere I Wander” and “Songs For A Lazy Afternoon”
2021	Vintage Sounds	Reissue	digital re-release of “Anywhere I Wander” and “Songs For A Lazy Afternoon”
2022	Vintage Charm	Reissue	digital re-release of “Anywhere I Wander” and “Songs For A Lazy Afternoon”

== Singles & EPs ==
Reissues are not listed.

Year	Name	Type	Notes
1956	"Jaydee"	Promotional Single	b/w "Happy Is A Boy Named Me"
1956	"Rock Island Line (with Rock Murphy & His Rockets)"	Single	b/w "Head Like A Rock (with Rock Murphy & His Rockets)"
1957	"Happy Is A Boy Named Me"	Single	b/w "Jaydee"
1957	"Rock, Pretty Baby (Part 3)"	EP	contains 2 Rod McKuen songs from the Rock, Pretty Baby soundtrack: "Picnic By The Sea" and "Happy Is A Boy Named Me"
1958	"Jump Up (In A Field Of Clover)"	Single	b/w "Two Brothers"
1958	"Selections From The Best Selling Album 'Time Of Desire'"	EP	contains 8 selections from the album Time Of Desire
1958	"Summer Love (Part 3)"	EP	contains 1 Rod McKuen song from the Summer Love soundtrack: "Calypso Rock"
1959	"Lonesome Boy"	Single	b/w "Times A-Gettin’ Hard"
1959	"Sure"	Promotional Single	'b/w "Take It Like A Man"
1960	"I Walk A Little Faster"	Promotional Single	b/w "Time After Time"
1960	"Lonesome Boy"	EP	contains 4 tracks of mostly non-album tracks
1960	"Two Brothers"	Single	b/w "Time After Time"
1961	"Marie, Marie"	Single	b/w "In A Lonely Place"
1961	"Oliver Twist"	Single	b/w "Celebrity Twist"; this is Rod McKuen's only Billboard-charting single at #76
1961	"Oliver Twist Meets The Duke Of Oil"	Single	b/w "Steel Men"
1962	"Celebrity Twist" and "Oliver Twist"	Single	no b-side (single-sided flexi)
1962	"I Dig Her Wig"	Single	b/w "Miss American Teen-Ager"
1962	"Miss American Teen-Ager"	Single	b-side by another artist
1962	"Riders In The Sky"	Single	b/w "The Cry Of The Wild Goose"
1963	"Ballad Of Hollywood (with Keystone Four)"	Single	b/w "Hi Lonesome!"
1963	"There’s A Hoot Tonight"	Single	b/w "Advice To Folksingers"
1964	"Chante En Français"	EP	contains 4 tracks sung in French
1964	"Seasons In The Sun"	Single	1964 version; b/w "Travelin'"
1964	"Sings For Lovers"	EP	contains 4 tracks from the Seasons In The Sun album
1964	"So Long Stay Well"	Single	b/w "Seasons In The Sun"
1964	"The World I Used To Know"	Single	b/w "Someplace Green" or "Doesn’t Anybody Know My Name"
1964	"The World I Used To Know"	EP	contains 4 tracks from the Sings Rod McKuen album
1965	"Rod McKuen"	EP	contains 4 tracks from the Prolific Composer Sings His Own album
1965	"Soldiers Who Want To Be Heroes"	Single	1963 version; b/w "Wayfarin’ Stranger"
1965	"Summer In My Eye"	Single	b/w "So Many Others"
1966	"Some Trust In Chariots"	Promotional Single	b/w "So Long San Francisco"
1966	"The Things Men Do"	Promotional Single	no b-side
1967	"Baby Be My Love"	Promotional Single	b/w "The Ever Constant Sea"
1967	"Chante Becaud"	EP	contains 4 tracks from the Through European Windows album
1967	"Excerpts From 'The Earth'"	Promotional EP	contains 2 tracks from the San Sebastian Strings album The Earth and an interview
1967	"Introduction To The New Warner Bros. Album: The Sea"	Promotional EP	contains 3 tracks from the San Sebastian Strings album The Earth and an interview
1967	"Listen To The Warm"	Promotional Single	b/w "A Cat Named Sloopy"
1967	"My Dog Likes Oranges"	Promotional Single	this is credited to The San Sebastian Strings alone; b/w "How Many Colors Of Blue"
1967	"Pushing The Clouds Away"	Single	this is credited to The San Sebastian Strings alone; b/w "The Days Of The Dancing"
1967	"The Mud Kids"	Single	this is credited to The San Sebastian Strings alone; b/w "The Tender Earth"
1967	"This Is Your Introduction To Rod McKuen's New Capitol Album The Love Movement"	Promotional EP	contains 4 tracks from The Love Movement album
1968	"A Cat Named Sloopy"	Single	b/w "Where Are We Now"
1968	"I’ll Catch The Sun"	Single	b/w "Kaleidoscope"
1968	"Joanna"	Single	from the Joanna soundtrack album; b/w "I'll Catch The Sun" or "Run To Me, Fly To Me"
1968	"Joanna"	Promotional EP	contains 5 tracks from the Joanna soundtrack album
1968	"Seasons In The Sun"	Single	1968 version; b/w "To Watch The Trains"
1968	"Selections From The Epic LP - In Search Of Eros"	Promotional EP	contains 8 tracks from the In Search Of Eros album
1968	"Selections From The New Rod McKuen Album: Lonesome Cities"	Promotional EP	contains 4 tracks from the Lonesome Cities album
1968	"The Importance Of The Rose"	Single	b/w "The Single Man"
1969	"Bring Her A Rose"	Single	b/w "Mr. Kelly/Kelly And Me"
1969	"Doesn’t Anybody Know My Name"	Single	b/w "The World I Used To Know"
1969	"For Lovers"	Promotional EP	contains 4 tracks from the San Sebastian Strings album For Lovers
1969	"I’ll Catch The Sun"	Single	b/w "Boat Ride - Los Angeles"
1969	"Jean"	Single	from "The Prime Of Miss Jean Brodie" soundtrack; b/w same (promo release), "Main Title - Edinburgh Morning" or "The Marvelous Clouds" (commercial release)
1969	"Kaleidoscope"	Promotional Single	b/w "The Ivy That Clings To The Walls"
1969	"Mr. Kelly/Kelly And Me (with The Stanyan Strings)"	Promotional Single	b/w same
1969	"The Sea"	Single	b/w "Home To The Sea"; this is credited to The San Sebastian Strings alone
1969	"The Time It Takes To Love You"	Single	b/w "The Things Men Do"
1969	"Trashy"	Single	b/w "Look Away"
1970	"A Boy Named Charlie Brown"	EP	contains 3 tracks from the A Boy Named Charlie Brown soundtrack
1970	"Arriva Charlie Brown"	EP	contains 1 track from the A Boy Named Charlie Brown soundtrack and 3 non-McKuen tracks
1970	"Champion Charlie Brown"	Single	from the A Boy Named Charlie Brown soundtrack; b/w same (promo release), "Something For Snoopy" (commercial release)
1970	"I Think It’s Going To Rain Today"	Single	b/w "London"
1970	"Jean"	Single	from "The Prime Of Miss Jean Brodie" soundtrack; b/w "Kaleidoscope"
1970	"La Mer"	EP	contains 3 tracks from the San Sebastian Strings album La Mer
1970	"London"	Promotional Single	b/w "As I Love My Own"
1970	"Mr. Bojangles"	Single	b/w "I Looked At You A Long Time"
1970	"Soldiers Who Want To Be Heroes"	Single	live at the London Palladium; b/w "My Mother’s Eyes"
1970	"Wings (Why Do They Want Us To Walk?) (with Rock Hudson)"	Single	b/w "Love Of The Common People (with Rock Hudson)"
1971	"A Cat Named Sloopy" and "Listen To The Warm"	Single	no b-side
1971	"Mr. Kelly/Kelly And Me (with The Stanyan Strings)"	Single	b/w "To Watch The Trains"
1971	"Pastures Green"	Single	from the Scandalous John soundtrack; b/w "Theme From Scandalous John"
1971	"Pastures Green"	EP	contains 3 tracks from the Scandalous John soundtrack
1971	"Soldiers Who Want To Be Heroes"	Single	single version; b/w "Hit `Em In The Head With Love" (promo release), "Three" or "My Mother's Eyes" (commercial release)
1971	"The Carols Of Christmas"	Single	b/w "So My Sheep May Safely Graze"
1971	"Without A Worry In The World"	Single	b/w "The Voyeur"
1972	"A Boy Named Charlie Brown"	Single	from the A Boy Named Charlie Brown soundtrack; b/w "Champion Charlie Brown"
1972	"Amor"	Single	1972 version; b/w "Solitude’s My Home"
1972	"And To Each Season (Part II)"	Promotional Single	b/w "Guess I'd Rather Be In Colorado"
1972	"Baby It’s Cold Outside (with Liesbeth List)"	Single	b-side by another artist
1972	"Favorites"	EP	contains 4 of Rod McKuen's most popular songs
1972	"Pastures Green" (single version)	Single	b/w "Friendly Sounds"
1972	"Solitude’s My Home"	Single	b/w "Amor"
1972	"The Far Side Of The Hill (with Liesbeth List)"	Single	b/w "October Odyssey (with Liesbeth List)"
1972	"The Time To Sing My Song"	Single	b/w "The Minute-Thirty-Second Waltz"
1972	"They’re Playing Our Song"	Single	b/w "Moment To Moment"
1973	"Cycles"	Single	b/w same (promo release), "I Have Loved You" (commercial release)
1973	"Seasons In The Sun"	Single	original version; b/w "Good For Nothing Bill"
1973	"Sunset Colors (with Anita Kerr & The San Sebastian Strings)"	Promotional Single	b/w "And Everyday Was Christmas (with Anita Kerr)"
1973	"The Far Side Of The Hill"	Promotional Single	b/w "Heaven Here On Earth"; this is the solo version
1973	"The World I Used To Know (with The Stanyan Strings)"	Single	b/w "Good For Nothin’ Bill"
1974	"Continue…"	Single	b/w same (promo release), "Song From The Third World (Have A Nice Day)" (commercial release)
1974	"Isn’t It Something"	Single	b/w "Anthem For The 70’s"
1974	"Rod McKuen"	EP	contains 4 of Rod McKuen's most popular songs
1974	"Seasons In The Sun" (re-release)	Single	b/w same (promo release), "And To Each Season" or "Heaven Here On Earth" (commercial release)
1974	"Selections From Bouquet: The Best Of The San Sebastian Strings"	Promotional EP	contains 4 songs from the Bouquet album with Anita Kerr & The San Sebastian Strings
1975	"Jean"	Single	b/w "Now I Have The Time"
1975	"Sleep Warm"	Single	b/w "There’s Never Been A Horse"
1975	"Soldiers Who Want To Be Heroes" (re-release)	Single	b/w "Seasons In The Sun"
1976	"Pastures Green" (re-release)	Single	b/w "Iris And Fido"
1976	"Rose"	Single	b/w "Silver Threads And Golden Needles"
1977	"Amor"	Single	1977 disco version; b/w different songs, including "Don’t Drink The Orange Juice", "Easy In", "Forever Young", "That’s Entertainment", "There’s A Lion In The Streets Of Johannesburg", or "What I Did For Love"
1977	"Send In The Clowns"	Single	b/w "Mr. Bojangles"
1978	"Kearney Street"	Single	b/w "And Sometimes"
1978	"The Wind Of Change (Aranjuez)"	Single	b/w "Don’t Drink The Orange Juice"
1979	"Mon Amour, Mon Ami"	Single	b/w "Moon River"
1979	"Moon River"	Single	b/w "Mon Amour, Mon Ami"
1979	"Slide...On The Move"	EP	contains 3 tracks from On The Move With Slide
1980	"Without A Worry In The World"	Single	b/w "Every Highway Is My Friend"
1981	"Another Suitcase In Another Hall"	Single	b/w "Now I Have The Time"
1981	"Three Track Single"	EP	contains 3 tracks from recent albums
1982	"These Gentle Islands We Call Home"	Single	b/w "At Long Last, Timaru"
1982	"Winter In America"	Single	b/w "These Gentle Islands We Call Home"
1992	"Amor" (re-release)	Single	b/w "Amor 92" and "Without A Worry In The World"

== Miscellaneous ==
Year	Name	Type	Notes
1956	Rock, Pretty Baby (Soundtrack)	Album	Rod contributes 2 songs to the soundtrack; he also appeared in the movie
1957	Summer Love (Soundtrack)	Album	Rod contributes 2 songs to the soundtrack; he also appeared in the movie
1959	Songs Our Mummy Taught Us	Album	this novelty album was co-written by Rod and Bob McFadden; it is credited to “Bob McFadden And Dor”
1959	"The Mummy"	Single	b/w "The Beat Generation"; this novelty single was written by Rod and credited to “Bob McFadden And Dor”
1959	"The 4-D Man"	Single	b/w "The South Shall Rise Again"; this novelty single performed by Rod is credited to “Dor And The Confederates”
1960	The Yellow Unicorn	Album	spoken word album; Rod contributes 4 tracks
1966	An Extraordinary Collection Of 20 New Rod McKuen Songs	Album	demonstration album of Rod songs, performed by McKuen, Glenn Yarbrough, and Art Nouveau & The Tiffany Ten
1967	A Man Alone	Album	acetate demonstration recording of the Frank Sinatra “A Man Alone” album; Rod recorded all the songs with an orchestra to present to Sinatra
1971	Short Cuts From Pastorale	Album	promotional album of 18 songs from the “Pastorale” album especially edited for radio play
1973	Spring	Album	promotional album mood music with spoken word by Rod; written by Rod, composed by Anita Kerr, performed by The San Sebastian Strings; the only commercial release of this album is in the 4-LP set “The Seasons”
1973	Rod McKuen Presents Oceans Of Beautiful Electric Music	Album	produced by Rod and performed by Ondine and the Los Angeles Electronic Consort; most songs written by Rod
1974	Love Conquers All	Album	promotional release of 200 copies only; 50 were mailed out to Stanyan Records customers to solicit reactions and comments, as the album is “a departure in musical concept for Rod”
1974	Music To Freak Your Friends And Break Your Lease	Album	this is an experimental noise album released on quadraphonic LP; it is credited to a pseudonym, Heins Hoffman-Richter
1975	Selections From The Essential Rod McKuen, Vol. 1	Album	promotional album of 16 songs from the compilation “The Essential Rod McKuen, Vol. 1”
1976	"Hearlove"	Singles	series of flexi-discs packaged with greeting cards; each disc contained one song/poem built around a common greeting card theme (28 unique cards/discs) or addressed to a person by name (various names, always followed by “I Think Of You”)
1983	Ben Bagley’s Jerome Kern Revisited Vol. IV	Album	this collection of various artists features 3 tracks by Rod
1989	It Had To Be You	Album	this collection was recorded & pressed to commemorate the 20th wedding anniversary of Ellen and Emile Mimran; it was limited to 300 copies, of which 200 were signed/numbered and 100 were marked “artist proof”
1992	The Beat Generation	Album	this 3-disc collection of various artists features 2 tracks by Rod, one of which is credited to “Bob McFadden And Dor”
1995	Songs That Won The War Vol. 1	Album	this 5-disc collection of various artists was produced by Rod; features 10 tracks by Rod
1995	Songs That Won The War Vol. 2	Album	this 5-disc collection of various artists was produced by Rod; features 7 tracks by Rod
1995	A Stanyan Christmas	Album	this collection of various artists features 5 tracks by Rod
2004	P22 Stanyan Autumn	Download	collection of 16 MP3 downloads included with the purchase of the “P22 Stanyan Autumn” font; all tracks were previously released
2017	Love’s Been Good To Me: The Songs Of Rod McKuen	Album	this collects various artists performing songs written by Rod; Rod contributes vocals on 3 tracks
unknown	Folk Concert (with Josh White)	Live	unauthorized release features 5 tracks credited to Rod and 3 credited to Josh White, though Rod's voice actually appears on only 1 track
