= SKY (keyboard layout) =

Keyboard layout for Japanese

SKY (Japanese: スカイ配列, Hepburn: Sukai hairetsu) is a Latin alphabet keyboard layout for typing Japanese developed in 1987. The name comes from the fact that the keys S, K, and Y are under the user's fingers in the home row of the left hand. According to the creator, SKY stands for “Simplified Keyboard for You”.

== Description ==
The basic arrangement of SKY published in “Journal of Information Processing Society” is:

,   W   R   M   H   UU   AI   OU   .   EI  
N   T   S   K   Y   U    A    O    I   E  
P   D   Z   G   B   UN   AN   ON   IN  EN

The left hand is responsible for consonants, the right hand is for vowels. As a result, almost alternating left and right keying is possible like in Dvorak.

The layout only has 30 keys, and since Japanese punctuation only requires full stops and commas, this means punctuation can be typed without changing keyboard layouts. In addition, the lack of capital letters in Japanese means implementation is simple, since users don't have to press the Shift key at the same time as another keystroke. It conserves keystrokes and also has a high ratio of hand alternation. It rarely requires the use of the same finger twice in a row in a vertical motion so more text can be input in the same amount of time.

== Sources ==
- Yoshio Shiratori, Fumihiko Obashi et al., “New Key Arrangement for Japanese Input and its Evaluation of Operability” (Information Processing Society of Japan Vol. 28 No. 6 p. 658 - 667, 1987).
