= West Hollywood Library =

Public library in West Hollywood, California, USA

Coordinates: 34.0819°N 118.3839°W

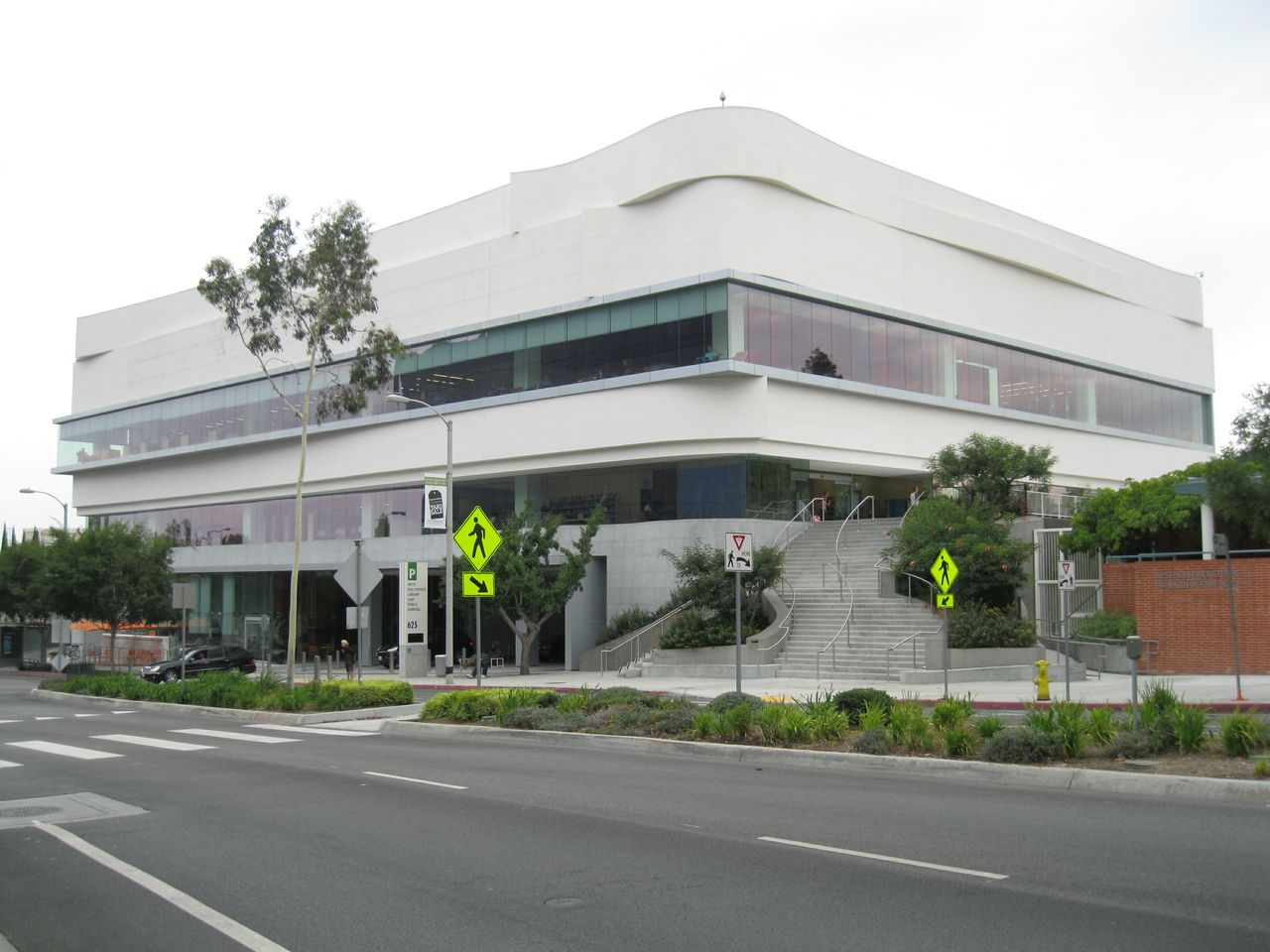
- The West Hollywood Library in 2013
- Location: 625 North San Vicente Boulevard; West Hollywood, California, United States
- Established: 2011

The West Hollywood Library is a public library in West Hollywood, California, U.S.. It is a branch of LA County Library.

== Architectural significance ==
The 33,150-square-foot building was completed in 2011. It was designed by architects Steve Johnson and James Favaro, with murals by Shepard Fairey and Kenny Scharf. It won the City Livability Award from the United States Conference of Mayors in 2012.

== Collection ==
The library collection includes LGBT fiction and non-fiction. It is the meeting place of the Lambda Literary Book Club, an LGBT-themed book club.

There are also books in Spanish and Russian.

== Gallery ==
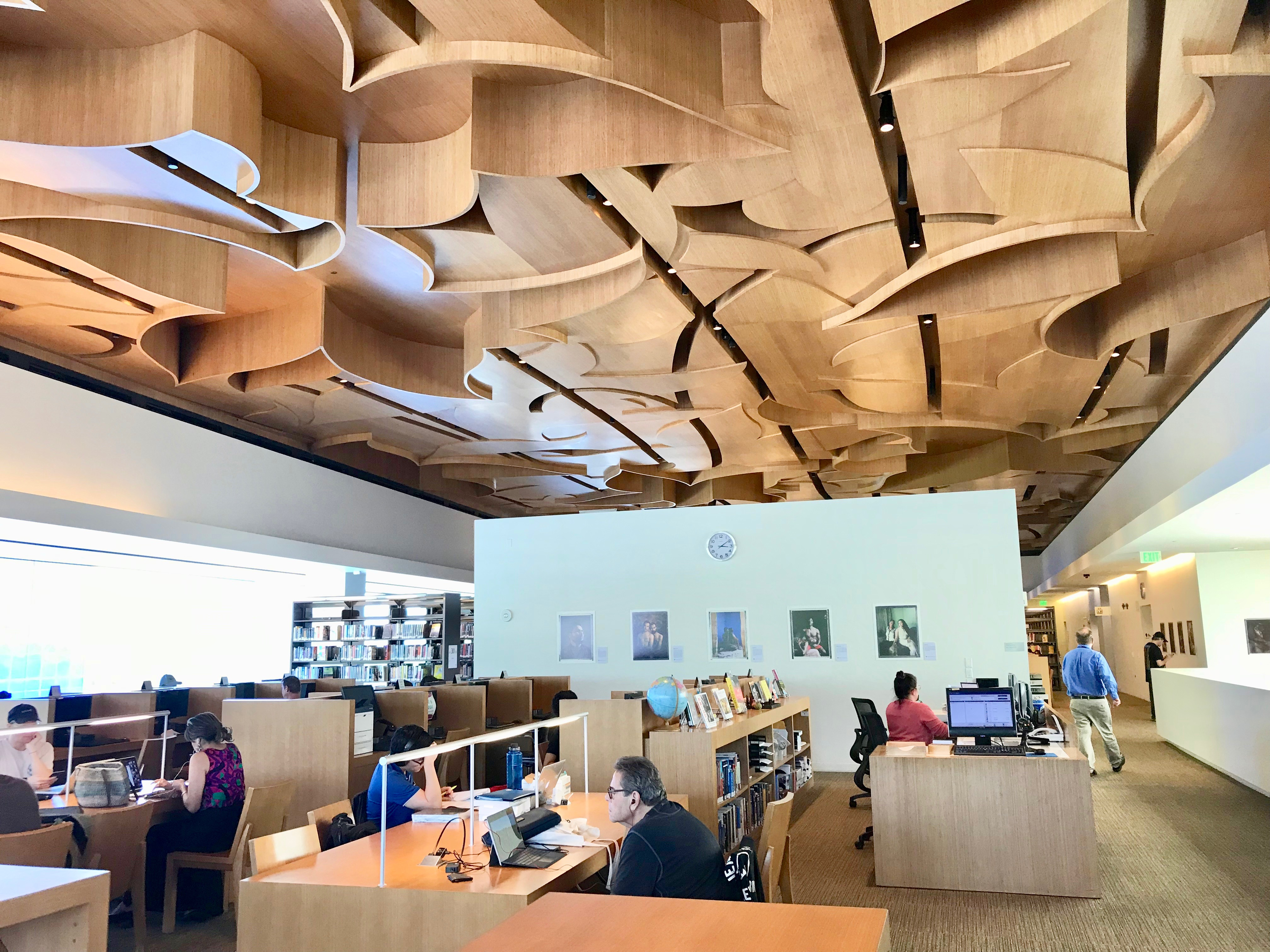
Inside the library

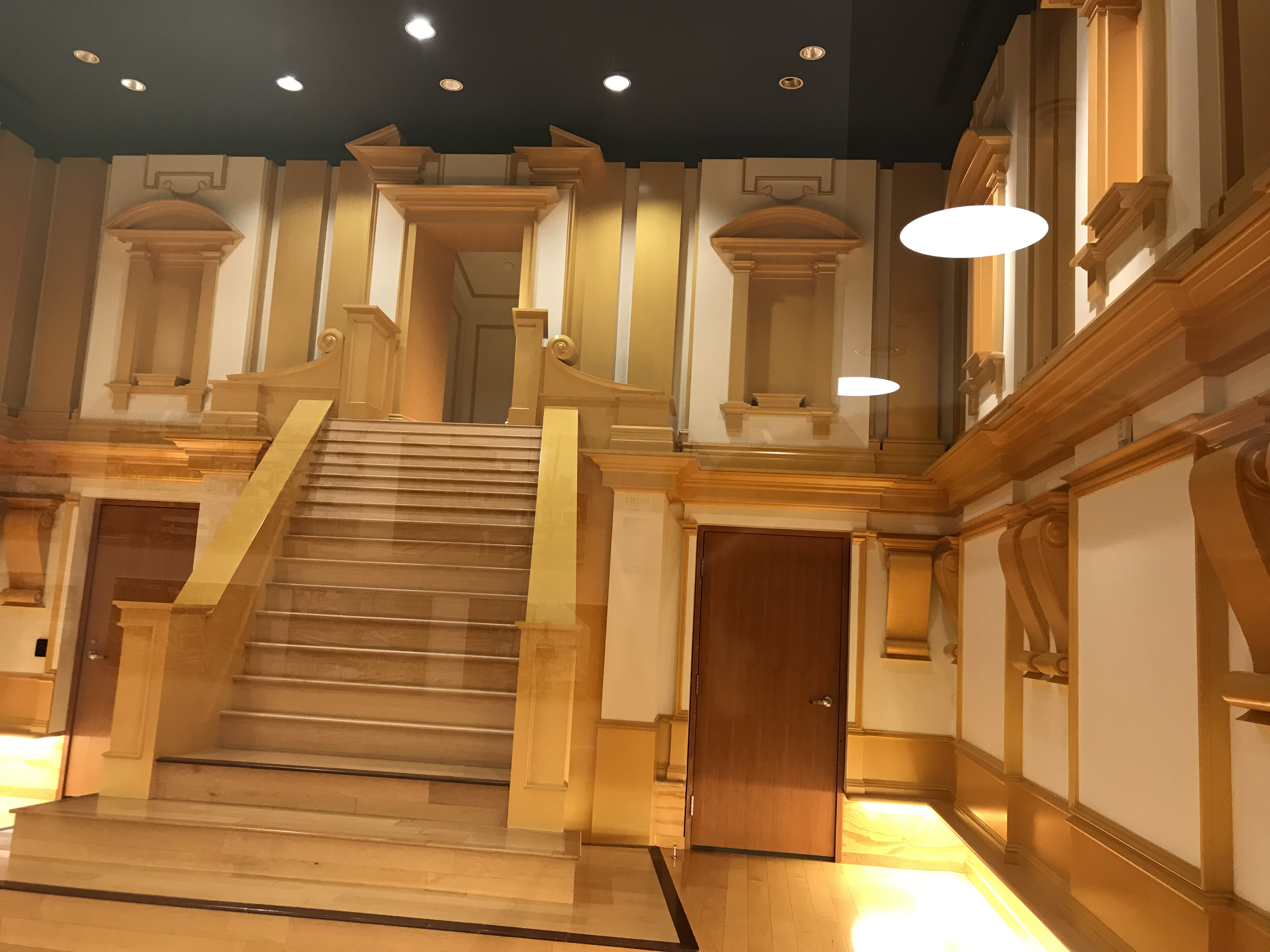
The theatre

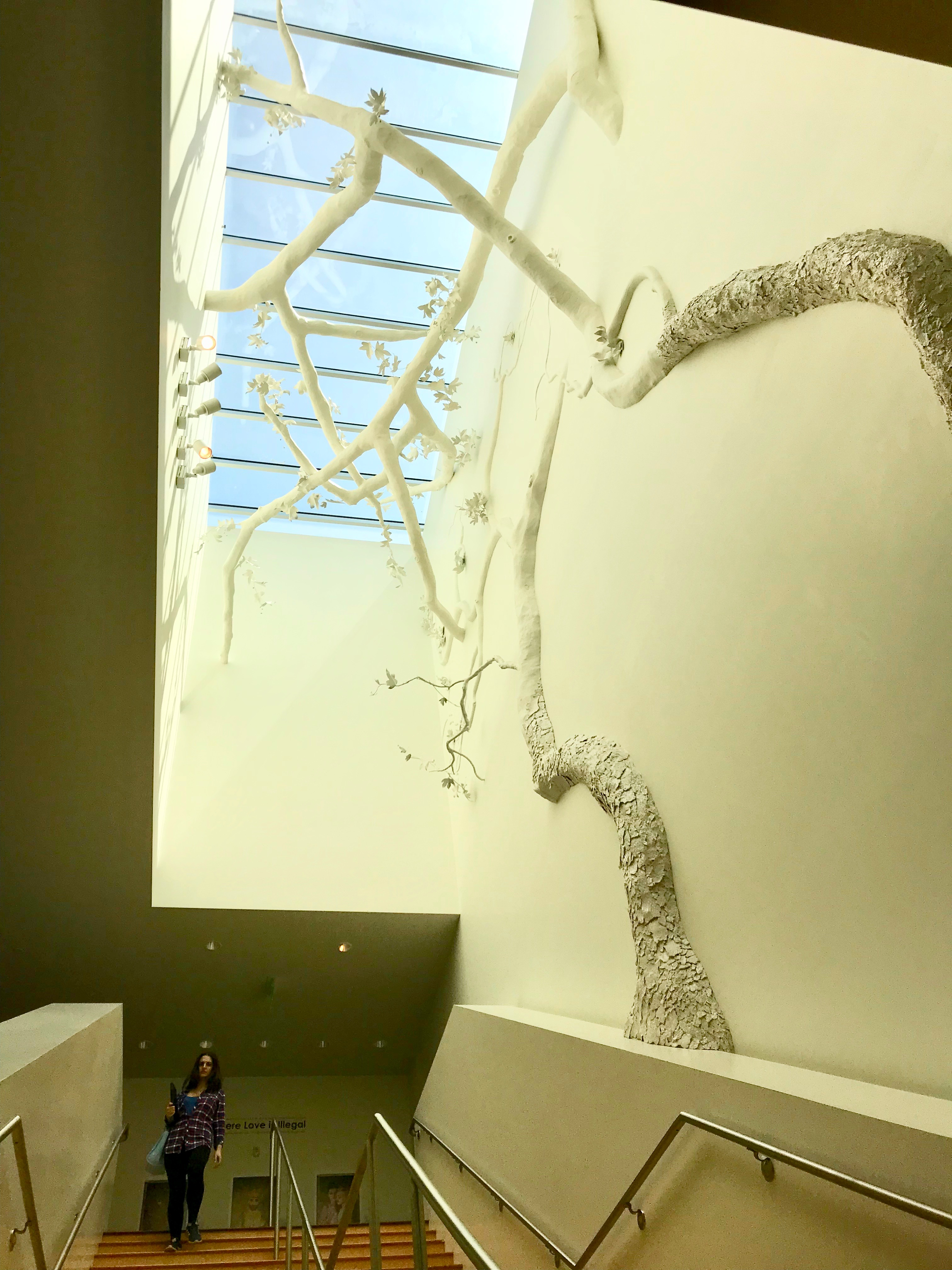
Main staircase with tree sculpture
