= Skyy Radio 106.6FM =

Skyy Radio (106.6 FM, "Skyy 106.6FM") is a privately owned commercial radio station in Sierra Leone. Its radio programming on FM frequency reaches Freetown, the capital city and its environs. The sister station "Kiss 104 FM" reaches the second largest city, Bo.
