= The Sky (Canadian TV program) =

- Genre: Science
- Written by: Don Erickson
- Presented by: Bob Fortune
- Country of origin: Canada
- Original language: English
- No. of seasons: 1
- No. of episodes: 15

Production
- Producer: Nancy Frager
- Production location: Vancouver
- Running time: 30 minutes
- Production company: CBUT Vancouver

Original release
- Network: CBC Television
- Release: 22 June – 28 September 1958

The Sky is a Canadian science television program that aired on CBC Television in 1958. It was broadcast on Sundays at 4:30 p.m. (Eastern) from 22 June to 28 September 1958.

Bob Fortune, a weather presenter for CBUT and columnist for the Vancouver Sun, hosted this program on various sky-related topics such as astrology, astronomy, aviation, rocketry and weather.
