= Touch the Sky (ATC album) =

Album by A Touch of Class

Studio album by A Touch of Class
- Released: March 23, 2003
- Recorded: 2001–2003
- Genre: Eurodance
- Labels: King Size; BMG

A Touch of Class chronology
Planet Pop (2001)	Touch the Sky (2003)

Singles from Touch the Sky
- 1. "I'm in Heaven (When You Kiss Me)" Released: July 21, 2001; 2. "Set Me Free" Released: February 9, 2002; 3. "Call On Me" Released: June 3, 2002; 4. "New York City" Released: March 5, 2003

Touch the Sky is the second and final album by Eurodance group A Touch of Class. The album was released on March 23, 2003 and peaked at number 97 in Germany. A Touch of Class ultimately decided to go their separate ways after the album's release.

== Track listing ==
1. "Call on Me"
2. "Star"
3. "I'm in Heaven (When You Kiss Me)"
4. "New York City"
5. "Set Me Free"
6. "No Place Like Home"
7. "Secret World"
8. "Touch the Sky"
9. "Moment in Time"
10. "I'm Gonna Make You Mine"
11. "Maybe"
12. "Baby, Bye, Bye"

== Music videos ==
- "I'm in Heaven (When You Kiss Me)"
- "Set Me Free"
- "New York City"

== Chart positions ==
Chart (2003)	Peak position
German Albums (Offizielle Top 100)	97
