= Skye Patrick =

American librarian

Dr. Skye Patrick
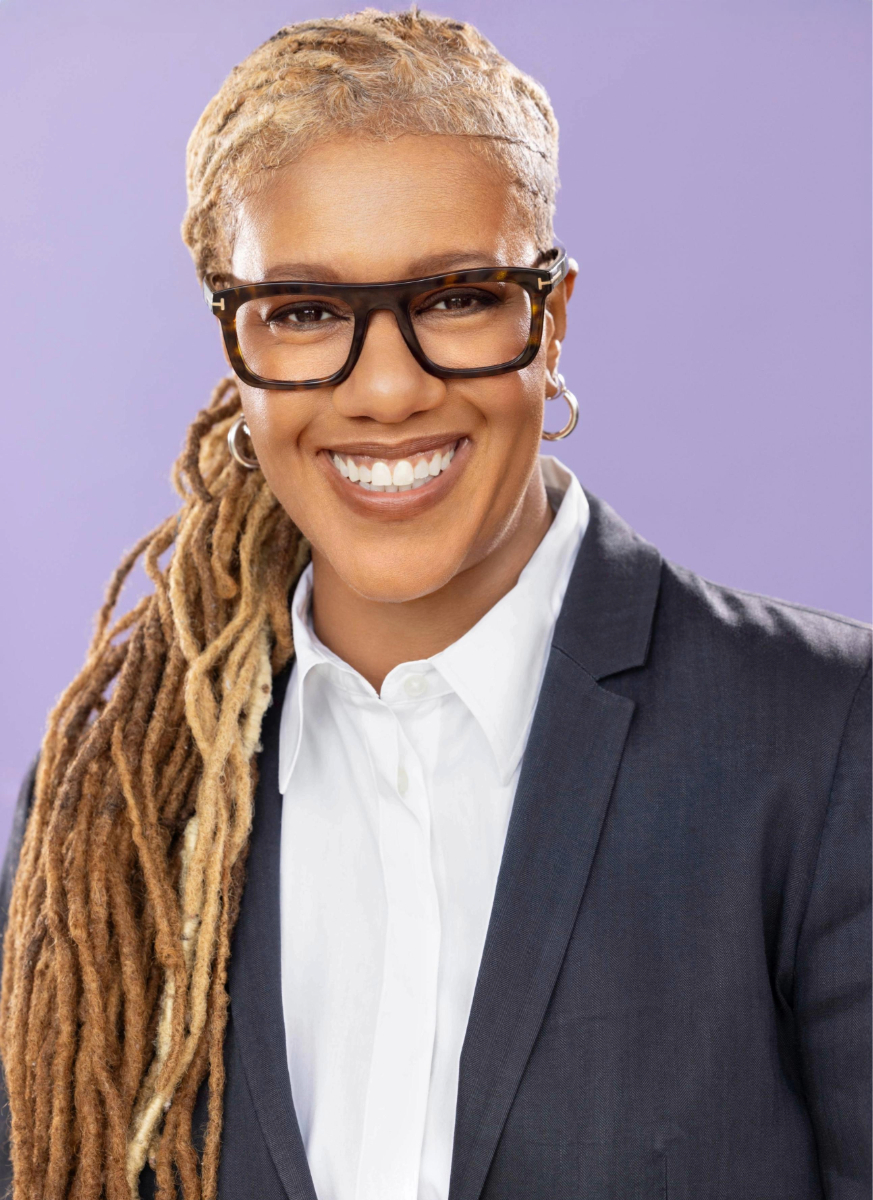
- Education: Northern Michigan University (B.F.A., 1996); University of Pittsburgh (M.L.I.S.); University of California, Los Angeles (Ph.D. in Information Studies, 2025)
- Occupation: Librarian
- Years active: February 2016 – present
- Employer: LA County Library
- Known for: First African American Director of LA County Library; equity-focused library initiatives
- Title: County Librarian and Director
- Awards: Stanton Fellowship (2019)

Dr. Skye Patrick is an American librarian who has served as Library Director of LA County Library since February 2016.

== Early life and education ==
Patrick grew up in Lansing, Michigan where she was partially in foster care. She worked as a library page while in high school and graduated from Northern Michigan University in 1996 with a bachelor of fine arts degree.

While at NMU, she helped create the Ten Percent Club which became the Gay, Lesbian, Bisexual, Transgender, and Intersexed Student Union. Her master’s degree in library and information science is from the University of Pittsburgh. Skye received her PhD in Information Studies from UCLA in September 2025.

== Earlier library experiences ==
Patrick was the Director of Libraries for Broward County, Florida where she was the second African American, the first openly LGBTQ person, and first woman to hold the position. Before that she was Assistant Director of the Queens Public Library and San Francisco Public Library.

== Library Director of LA County Library ==
Patrick has served as Library Director of LA County Library since February 2016 and is its first African American Director. The Library Director oversees Los Angeles County's 85 libraries, 1 institutional library, 4 Cultural Resource Centers, and a mobile fleet of MākMō maker mobiles and Bookmobiles, serving 3.5 million people with an annual operating budget of over $200 million as of 2023.

Under Patrick's tenure, the Library started a fine-forgiveness program where patrons under 21 can "read away" their late fees, resulting in 13,000 previously blocked accounts being reinstated. The Library also eliminated fines for overdue books and materials in August 2021.

Patrick implemented LA County Library’s iCount initiative, which prioritizes the design and development of services and programs that address the needs of diverse customers and their varying age groups, genders, sexual orientations, ethnicities, social-economic status, physical abilities, nationalities, and legal status.

Among the services and programs that were developed by Patrick to address the needs of communities of color, is LA County Library’s partnership with Barbershop Books and My Brother’s Keeper. Barbershop Books created child-friendly reading spaces inside 10 barbershops in South Los Angeles that were intended to help black boys ages 4-8 identify as readers by connecting to books and reading in a male-centered space.

Patrick also launched a series of services to address the Digital Divide with a laptop and hotspot lending program called Laptop & Hotspot Loans and Park & Connect, which allows customers to access free outdoor wi-fi at the library’s parking lots. In 2019, she wrote an editorial for the LA Times with Los Angeles Public Library City Librarian John Szabo about publishers' limiting sales of ebooks to public libraries, encouraging library patrons to pressure publishers to offer more favorable licensing terms to libraries.

== Honors and awards ==
- Stanton Fellowship (2019)
- Library Journal's Librarian of the Year (2019)
- Community Impact Award from Innovate@UCLA (2020)
- James Irvine Foundation Leadership Award (2025)
- Elected President of the Public Library Association (2026)
