= LA County Library =

Public library system in California

- 33°55′40″N 118°09′41″W
- Location: Downey, California, United States
- Type: Public
- Established: 1912
- Reference to legal mandate: County Free Library Act
- Branches: 86

Collection
- Size: 4,799,808
- Criteria for collection: County residents

Access and use
- Circulation: 13,026,434
- Population served: 3,375,417
- Members: 3,045,433

Other information
- Budget: US$131,063,244 (2015/16)
- Director: Skye Patrick, County Librarian
- Employees: 1,483 (2010)
- Website: www.lacountylibrary.org

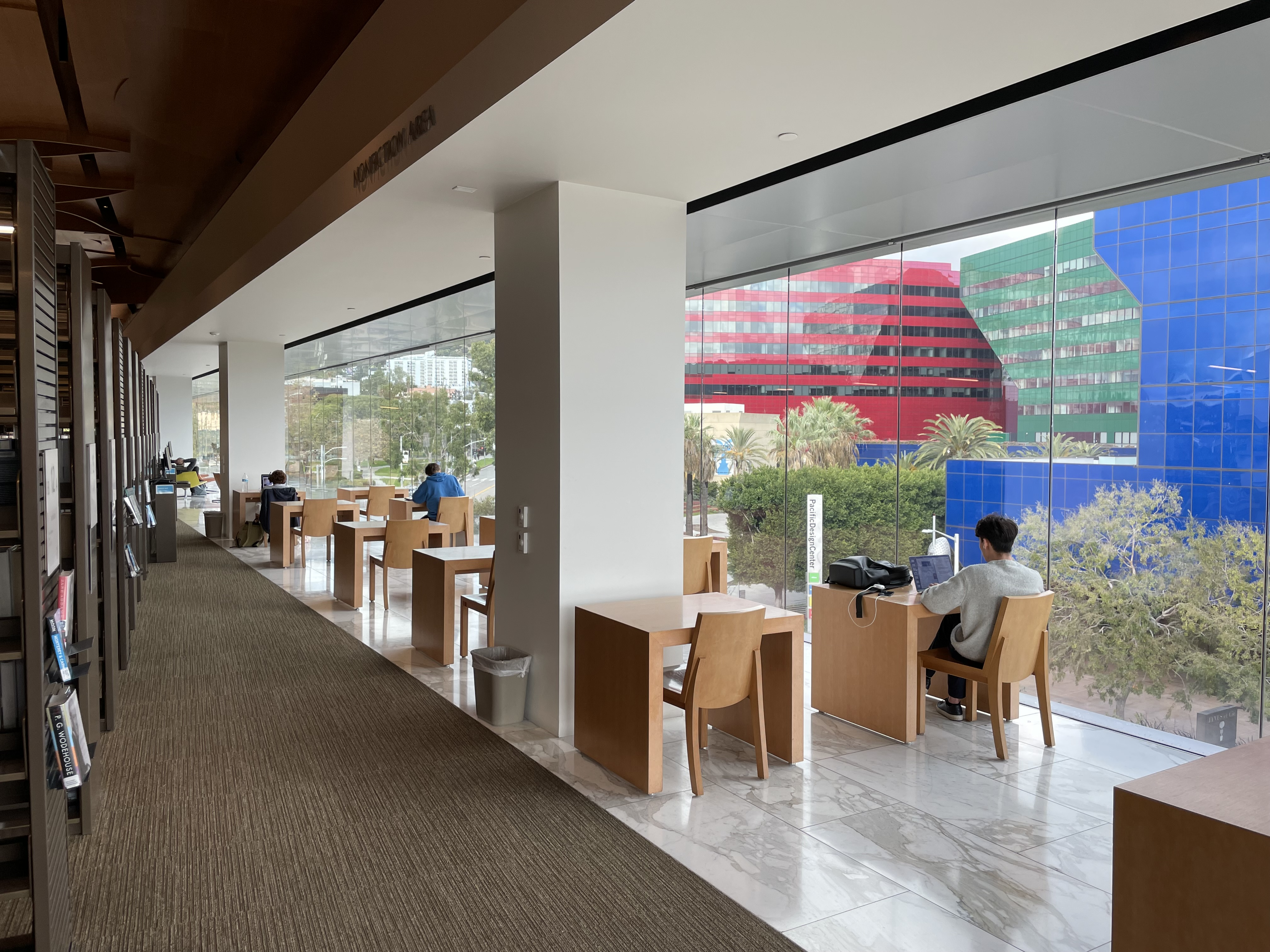
Reading areas at West Hollywood Library

LA County Library is one of the largest public library systems in the United States which serves residents living in 49 of the 88 incorporated cities of Los Angeles County, California. United States, and those living in unincorporated areas resulting in a service area extending over 3,000 square miles (7,800 km^{2}). The LA County Library system provides local libraries to several unincorporated areas and cities across Los Angeles County.

== History ==
On February 25, 1911, California enacted the County Free Library Law, by which all county governments were authorized to establish a "county free library" to serve all areas of the county where cities and towns had not already established free public libraries. This led to the establishment of the Los Angeles County Free Library, later to become the Los Angeles County Public Library system of branches. c. 1914, the collection was kept on the “10th floor of the Hall of Records, North Broadway and Franklin Streets.”

The library system, headquartered in Downey, California, is overseen by the Library Commission of 20 appointed members who report on administration, operation, and service to the County Board of Supervisors who operate County Library as a special fund department.

Skye Patrick was appointed County Librarian on February 1, 2016.

== Partnerships and community outreach ==
LA County Library initiated a partnership with the Los Angeles County Probation Department to serve systems-involved youth with an institutional library at Central Juvenile Hall. It offers collections and trained librarians to help improve literacy, teach parenting skills, and encourage respectful interactions. Programming at five Probation Juvenile Day Reporting Centers teaches life skills, builds self-confidence, and introduces potential career paths.

LA County Library also partnered with County of Los Angeles departments to implement lived experience programs aimed at redirecting youth from engaging in at-risk behaviors. The My Brother's Keeper Peer Advocate program hires young adults of color with lived experience as advisors and liaisons. These Peer Advocates build community relationships, develop programming, and raise awareness of Library services.

LA County Library launched three book kiosks located at County housing sites: Cedar Springs Housing in La Verne serving transition age youth, tenants with mental health disorders, and low-income families; Carmelitos in Long Beach; and Nueva Maravilla Senior Housing in East Los Angeles. The Library installed bookshelves at 10 barbershops across South Los Angeles to encourage reading for boys ages 4 – 8 to help minimize the literacy gap between young men of color and their peers.

In honor of Banned Books Week, LA County Library joined Books Unbanned in October 2023. This service provides free library cards to all California residents ages 13–18.

== Awards and accolades ==
LA County Library was a finalist for the IMLS National Medal in 2018 and 2019.

LA County Library won the 2018 Marketer of the Year Award, the 2019 Librarian of the Year Award for Skye Patrick, and the 2019 Library of the Year Award. All three awards were from Library Journal, and this was the first time a single organization held all three awards at the same time.

In 2023, LA County Library was selected as one of eight recipients of the 2023 National Medal for Museum and Library Service, the nation's highest honor given to museums and libraries that demonstrate excellence in service to their communities.

== Services and resources ==
The library provides many resources, including literacy services and programs for families and children.

The library system offers consumer health information under CHIPS (Consumer Health Information Program and Services).

== Branches ==
| Name | Photograph | Address | Community | Notes |
|---|---|---|---|---|
| A.C. Bilbrew Library | | 150 E El Segundo Blvd, Los Angeles, CA 90061 | Willowbrook | Named for A. C. Bilbrew |
| Acton Agua Dulce Library | | 33792 Crown Valley Rd, Acton, CA 93510 | Acton | |
| Alondra Library | | 11949 Alondra Blvd, Norwalk, CA 90650 | Norwalk | |
| Agoura Hills Library | | 29901 Ladyface Court, Agoura Hills, CA 91301 | Agoura Hills | |
| Angelo M. Iacoboni Library | | 4990 Clark Ave, Lakewood, CA 90712 | Lakewood | |
| Anthony Quinn Library | | 3965 Cesar E Chavez Ave, Los Angeles, CA 90063 | East Los Angeles | |
| Artesia Library | | 18801 Elaine Ave, Artesia, CA 90701 | Artesia | |
| Avalon Library | | 215 Sumner Ave, Avalon, CA 90704 | Avalon | |
| Carson Library | | 151 E Carson St, Carson, CA 90745 | Carson | |
| Castaic Library | | 27971 Sloan Canyon Rd, Castaic, CA 91384 | Castaic | |
| Charter Oak Library | | 20540 E Arrow Highway Suite K, Covina, CA 91724 | Charter Oak | |
| Chet Holifield Library | | 1060 S Greenwood Ave, Montebello, CA 90640 | Montebello | |
| City Terrace Library | | 4025 E City Terrace Dr, Los Angeles, CA 90063 | City Terrace | |
| Claremont Helen Renwick Library | | 208 N Harvard Ave, Claremont, CA 91711 | Claremont | |
| Clifton M. Brakensiek Library | | 9945 E Flower St, Bellflower, CA 90706 | Bellflower | |
| Compton Library | | 240 W Compton Blvd, Compton, CA 90220 | Compton | |
| Cudahy Library | | 5218 Santa Ana St, Cudahy, CA 90201 | Cudahy | |
| Culver City Julian Dixon Library | | 4975 Overland Ave, Culver City, CA 90230 | Culver City | Named for Julian Dixon |
| Diamond Bar Library | | 21800 Copley Dr, Diamond Bar, CA | Diamond Bar | |
| Dr. Martin Luther King Jr. Library | | 17906 S Avalon Blvd, Carson, CA 90746 | Carson | Named after Martin Luther King Jr. |
| Duarte Library | | 1301 Buena Vista St, Duarte, CA 91010 | Duarte | |
| East Los Angeles Library | | 4837 E 3rd St, Los Angeles, CA 90022 | East Los Angeles | |
| El Camino Real Library | | 4264 E Whittier Blvd, Los Angeles, CA 90023 | East Los Angeles | |
| El Monte Library | | 3224 Tyler Ave, El Monte, CA 91731 | El Monte | |
| Florence Library | | 7807 Compton Ave, Los Angeles, CA 90001 | Florence-Graham | |
| Gardena Mayme Dear Library | | 1731 W Gardena Blvd, Gardena, CA 90247 | Gardena | |
| George Nye Jr. Library | | 16600 Del Amo Blvd, Lakewood, CA 90713 | Cerritos | |
| Graham Library | | 1900 E Firestone Blvd, Los Angeles, CA 90001 | Firestone Park | |
| Hacienda Heights Library | | 16010 La Monde St, Hacienda Heights, CA | Hacienda Heights | |
| Hawaiian Gardens Library | | 11940 Carson St, Hawaiian Gardens, CA | Hawaiian Gardens | |
| Hawthorne Library | | 12700 Grevillea Ave, Hawthorne, CA 90250 | Hawthorne | |
| Hermosa Beach Library | | 550 Pier Ave, Hermosa Beach, CA | Hermosa Beach | |
| Hollydale Library | | 12000 Garfield Ave, South Gate, CA 90280 | South Gate | |
| Huntington Park Library | | 6518 Miles Ave, Huntington Park, CA | Huntington Park | |
| La Cañada Flintridge Library | | 4545 N Oakwood Ave, La Canada Flintridge, CA 91011 | La Cañada Flintridge | |
| La Crescenta Library | | 2809 Foothill Blvd, La Crescenta, CA 91214 | La Crescenta | |
| La Mirada Library | | 13800 La Mirada Blvd, La Mirada, CA 90638 | La Mirada | |
| La Puente Library | | 15920 E Central Ave, La Puente, CA 91744 | La Puente | |
| La Verne Library | | 3640 D St, La Verne, CA 91750 | La Verne | |
| Lake Los Angeles Library | | 16921 E Avenue O, #A, Palmdale, CA 93591 | Lake Los Angeles | |
| Lancaster Library | | 601 W Lancaster Blvd, Lancaster, CA 93534 | Lancaster | |
| Lawndale Library | | 14615 Burin Ave, Lawndale, CA 90260 | Lawndale | |
| Leland R. Weaver Library | | 4035 Tweedy Blvd, South Gate, CA 90280 | South Gate | |
| Lennox Library | | 4359 Lennox Blvd, Lennox, CA 90304 | Lennox | |
| Littlerock Library | | 35119 80th St East, Littlerock, CA 93543 | Littlerock | |
| Live Oak Library | | 22 W Live Oak Ave, Arcadia, CA 91007 | Arcadia | |
| Lloyd Taber-Marina del Rey Library | | 4533 Admiralty Way, Marina del Rey, CA | Marina del Rey | |
| Lomita Library | | 24200 Narbonne Ave, Lomita, CA 90717 | Lomita | |
| Los Nietos Library | | 8511 Duchess Drive, Whittier, CA 90606 | West Whittier-Los Nietos | |
| Lynwood Library | | 11320 Bullis Rd, Lynwood, CA 90262 | Lynwood | |
| Malibu Library | | 23519 W Civic Center Way, Malibu, CA 90265 | Malibu | |
| Manhattan Beach Library | | 1320 Highland Ave, Manhattan Beach, CA | Manhattan Beach | |
| Masao W. Satow Library | | 14433 Crenshaw Blvd, Gardena, CA 90249 | Gardena | |
| Maywood César Chávez Library | | 4323 E Slauson Ave, Maywood, CA 90270 | Maywood | Named for Cesar Chavez |
| Montebello Library | | 1550 W Beverly Blvd, Montebello, CA 90640 | Montebello | |
| Norwalk Library | | 12350 Imperial Hwy, Norwalk, CA 90650 | Norwalk | |
| Norwood Library | | 4550 N Peck Rd, El Monte, CA 91732 | El Monte | |
| Paramount Express Library | | 13451 Merkel Ave, Paramount, CA 90723 | Paramount | |
| Pico Rivera Library | | 9001 Mines Ave, Pico Rivera, CA 90660 | Pico Rivera | |
| Quartz Hill Library | | 5040 West Avenue M-2, Quartz Hill, CA 93536 | Quartz Hill | |
| Rivera Library | | 7828 S Serapis Ave, Pico Rivera, CA 90660 | Pico Rivera | |
| Rosemead Library | | 8800 Valley Blvd, Rosemead, CA 91770 | Rosemead | |
| Rowland Heights Library | | 1850 Nogales Street, Rowland Heights, CA 91748 | Rowland Heights | |
| San Dimas Library | | 145 N Walnut Ave, San Dimas, CA 91773 | San Dimas | |
| San Fernando Library | | 217 N Maclay Ave, San Fernando, CA | San Fernando | |
| San Gabriel Library | | 500 S Del Mar Ave, San Gabriel, CA 91776 | San Gabriel | |
| Sorensen Library | | 6934 Broadway Ave, Whittier, CA 90606 | Whittier | |
| South El Monte Library | | 1430 North Central Avenue, South El Monte, CA 91733 | South El Monte | |
| South Whittier Library | | 11543 Colima Road, Whittier, CA 90604 | Whittier | |
| Stevenson Ranch Library | | 25950 The Old Road, Stevenson Ranch, CA 91381 | Stevenson Ranch | |
| Sunkist Library | | 840 N Puente Ave, La Puente, CA 91746 | La Puente | |
| Temple City Library | | 5939 Golden West Ave., Temple City, CA 91780 | Temple City | |
| Topanga Library | | 122 N Topanga Canyon Blvd, Topanga, CA 90290 | Topanga | |
| View Park Bebe Moore Campbell Library | | 3854 W 54th St, Los Angeles, CA 90043 | View Park | Named for Bebe Moore Campbell |
| Walnut Library | | 21155 La Puente Rd, Walnut, CA 91789 | Walnut | |
| West Covina Library | | 1601 W West Covina Pkwy, West Covina, CA 91790 | West Covina | |
| West Hollywood Library | | 625 N San Vicente Blvd, West Hollywood, CA 90069 | West Hollywood | |
| Westlake Village Library | | 31220 Oak Crest Dr, Westlake Village, CA 91361 | Westlake Village | |
| Willowbrook Library | | 11737 Wilmington Ave, Los Angeles, CA 90059 | Willowbrook | |
| Wiseburn Library | | 5335 W 135th St, Hawthorne, CA 90250 | Hawthorne | |
| Woodcrest Library | | 1340 W 106th St, Los Angeles, CA 90044 | Westmont | |

=== Bookmobiles ===
- Antelope Valley West Bookmobile
- Antelope Valley East Bookmobile
- East Bookmobile
- Gateway Bookmobile

== COVID-19 response ==
When LA County Library was forced to close its doors in March 2020 at the start of the COVID-19 pandemic, the Library established a Laptop & Hotspot Loan service, expanded Wi-Fi service to Library parking lots with Park & Connect, and developed virtual programs on YouTube and Webex Events for all ages and interests, such as programs about distance learning and workforce development. Since the beginning of the program to 2025, more than 12,000 laptops were checked out.

The laptop lending program is set to end at the end of 2025 after the Trump Administration's FCC terminated assistance for programs aimed at improving digital access. The Wi-Fi lending program's fate is unclear.
