= Planet Pop =

Studio album by A Touch of Class
- Released: 6 November 2000
- Recorded: 1999–2000
- Genre: Eurodance
- Length: 57:00
- Labels: King Size; BMG

A Touch of Class chronology
Planet Pop (2000)	Touch the Sky (2003)

Singles from "Planet Pop"
- 1. "Around the World (La La La La La)" Released: 22 May 2000; 2. "My Heart Beats Like a Drum (Dum Dum Dum)" Released: 2 September 2000; 3. "Thinking of You" Released: 4 December 2000; 4. "Why Oh Why" Released: 12 February 2001

Professional ratings
Review scores
Source	Rating
AllMusic	2/5 stars

Planet Pop is the debut album by Eurodance group A Touch of Class. The album was released internationally on 6 November 2000 and in the United States on 6 February 2001. It reached No. 73 on the Billboard 200.

The album's lead single, the Euro-dance/Hi-NRG track "Around the World (La La La La La)", was the band's most successful single, peaking at number 28 on the Billboard Hot 100.

== Track listing ==
1. "Introducing ATC" 0:41
2. "Around the World (La La La La La)" 3:38
3. "My Heart Beats Like a Drum (Dum Dum Dum)" 3:43
4. "Thinking of You" 3:45
5. "Until" 3:50
6. "Mistake No. 2" 4:08
7. "Why Oh Why" 3:55
8. "Without Your Love" 3:23
9. "So Magical" 3:38
10. "Notte D'amore Con Te" (English: Night of Love With You) 4:06
11. "Mind Machine" 3:37
12. "Let Me Come & Let Me Go" 3:17
13. "Lonely" 3:51
14. "Lonesome Suite" 1:08
15. "Love Is Blind" 3:04
16. "With You" 3:52
17. "Heartbeat Outro" 1:07
18. "My Heart Beats Like a Drum (Dum Dum Dum)" (international radio edit; bonus track) 3:55

== B-sides ==
- "World in Motion" (3:31) – B-side to "Around the World (La La La La La)"

== Chart positions ==
Chart (2000–01)	Peak position
Austrian Albums (Ö3 Austria)	46
Finnish Albums (Suomen virallinen lista)	10
German Albums (Offizielle Top 100)	11
Hungarian Albums (MAHASZ)	20
Swiss Albums (Schweizer Hitparade)	47
US Billboard 200	73
