= SKY Magazine =

British magazine

- Frequency: Fortnightly until December 1987, then monthly
- First issue: 23 April 1987
- Final issue: June 2001
- Company: EMAP
- Country: United Kingdom
- Based in: London, England
- Language: English

SKY Magazine was a British magazine that was published between 1987 and 2001. It was an entertainment magazine dealing mainly in celebrities featured in film, television and music.

Originally produced by News International's magazine division as a fortnightly, the title struggled and was sold to EMAP, who relaunched it as a monthly.

The magazine was aimed at young people of both sexes, a fairly unusual stance by the mid-1990s. Cover stars were both male and female and were photographed and commented from a sexually interested viewpoint regardless of their sex. Famous, often nude or scantily clad, cover stars included Madonna (most frequently featured), Louise Nurding, Anna Friel, Kylie Minogue, Mark Wahlberg, Brad Pitt, Nick Kamen and Ewan McGregor. In the later years there also featured a number of 'Sex Issues', asking for responses from hetero and gay people of both sexes.

Another frequent feature for a number of years was the back page advice column from Karen Krizanovich, an American journalist who would generally belittle advice seekers, helping them to solve their own problems.

From the mid-1990s, cover stars were in the great majority female, and of a more scantily clad appearance than previously. In later years, the magazine was frequently found alongside lad mags like Loaded, FHM and Maxim on newsagents' shelves.

The magazine was closed in 2001 following a 35% year-on-year fall in circulation to just 65,000 per month, despite a revamp the previous year intended to stem a longer term circulation decline.
