= Sky Kids (magazine) =

UK monthly magazine, 2004–2009

- Categories: TV
- Frequency: Monthly
- First issue: March 2004
- Final issue: October 2009
- Country: United Kingdom
- Language: English

Sky Kids magazine was a monthly magazine which came with the Sky Magazine. It was in circulation between 2004 and 2009.

== History and profile ==
Sky Kids Magazine was started in 2004. The magazine was published on a monthly basis and available exclusively to BSkyB customers with children. The target audience was children aged between six and twelve. It was provided free upon request, where visitors to the Sky website could request the magazine for their children by entering their details and viewing card numbers.

The magazine contained games, puzzles, competitions and TV highlights. It was closed in 2009 with the October issue being the final edition. The other Sky Magazine continued to run as normal, and was not affected.
