= Sky Magazine =

British entertainment magazine

- Categories: TV
- Frequency: M 2 Months
- Circulation: 7.4 million
- Final issue: October 2011
- Company: British Sky Broadcasting
- Country: United Kingdom, Republic of Ireland
- Language: English

Sky Magazine (or 'Sky Mag') was a magazine distributed to subscribers of the BSkyB satellite service Sky Digital.

== Availability ==
The magazine was available to subscribers of the Variety Pack or all packs of entertainment.

== Content ==
The magazine's content varied from edition to edition, but tended to include:

- Interviews with celebrities.
- Television listings and guides for Sky Movies and Sports channels.
- Programme reviews and recommended viewing guides.
- Sky services, Adult channels and premium services advertising.
- Information regarding updates, price changes, etc..
- A newsletter called Sky Month to give tips on how to use Sky.

== End of magazine ==
The magazine ceased publication in October 2011. The October/November edition was the final one. The publication was replaced by a weekly customer email newsletter with programming highlights.
