= Sky Arts (New Zealand TV channel) =

- Country: New Zealand

Programming
- Picture format: 1080i (HDTV) 16:9

Ownership
- Owner: Sky Network Television
- Sister channels: Sky Open; Sky Factual; Sky Justice; Sky Suspect; Sky Drama; Jones! Sky Movies; Sky Comedy; Sky Kids

History
- Launched: 2004; 22 years ago

Links
- Website: Official Site

Availability

Streaming media
- Sky Go: skygo.co.nz

Sky Arts is a niche television channel in New Zealand available on Sky, launched in 2004. It initially was an independently-owned service, simply known as Arts Channel, but it was sold to Sky in 2009 and subsequently renamed Sky Arts.

Its content is high-quality arts entertainment and information. Programming includes music, documentaries on visual arts, design, sculpture, architecture, literature, theatre, history of the arts, symphony orchestra concerts, ballet, dance, and opera.

The channel is available as a separate subscription since launch.

== History ==
The channel, as Arts Channel, was founded by David Ross, founder of the Rialto Channel, in 2004, being owned by Niche Media International. He was joined by a board of directors which included former Auckland Philharmonia director Lloyd Williams and arts philanthropist James Wallace. At launch, most programmes were acquired from Europe and the United States; its primetime strategy announced the airing of one new work at day, screening major works at 8:30pm nightly, and with high repeat potential. Costing NZ$12 per subscription, it would, thanks to Sky's co-operation, lease its channel capacity in the daytime to subsidise its operations. Broadcasts began on 1 March that year, being offered as a free preview to all subscribers to entice a potential audience.

In July 2009, Ross announced his intent to sell the channel to Sky due to the small size of New Zealand's television market. Under Sky, Chris de Bazin was appointed its manager. It also aimed to buy documentaries that were left out when the BBC acquired Documentary Channel in late 2010. By early 2015, Sky Arts was "performing well", even though its ratings and subscription base were low compared to the Sky Sport network. As of 2017, the channel was carrying Later... With Jools Holland; in June that year, two New Zealand singers took part, Sky Arts aired it on a delay.
