= List of documentary television channels =

The table below presents a list of documentary channels, including ones affected by "channel drift" and those accused of having a biased point of view.

== List ==
Name	Launch	Country	Language	Content focus	Change of content/bias	Examples of content in original focus (past and present)	Owner/parent company
3+ Focus	2013	Switzerland	German	History and society documentary			CH Media
PBS America	2011	United Kingdom	English	History, Science, Current Affairs and Arts & Culture	Available on Sky, Virgin Media, Freeview and Freesat		PBS
A&E	1984	United States	English	Documentaries, biographies and crime dramas (originally)	Reality shows, stereotypes (Southerners)	The First 48, Criminal Minds, CSI:Miami	A+E Networks
ABC	1956	Australia	English	Mass media, United States cable	Live broadcasts (sports), tv shows (television programs), reality shows		
American Heroes Channel	1999	USA	English	World War II, U.S. war documentaries			
Animal Planet	1996	USA	English	Wildlife, animals, relation between humans and animals	Speculative fiction and pseudo-documentaries (mermaids, dragons), non-animal shows	Cats 101, Dogs 101	Skydance
APTN	1992	Canada	English	Programs and news about Aboriginal peoples in Canada	Some non-Aboriginal programming	APTN National News, Blackstone, Cooking With the Wolfman	
Arte	1992	France, Germany	French, German	Arts, Culture			
Arte 1	2012	Brazil	Portuguese	Arts including, theatrical performances, movies, documentaries and music			Grupo Bandeirantes de Comunicação
BBC	1922	UK	English	Mass media, public broadcasting			
BBC Four	1999	UK	English	Culture, current affairs			British Broadcasting Corporation
BBC Earth	2015	UK	English	Nature and wildlife documentaries			BBC Studios
BBC Parliament	1992	UK	English	Parliamentary and legislative programs			British Broadcasting Corporation
BeIN İZ	2006	Turkey	Turkish	History and society documentary			beIN Media Group
Bravo	1995	Canada	English	Television dramas, films, art-related programming	Film-dramas, non-art TV shows	Inside the Actors Studio, Blue Bloods, 19-2, Dallas, Criminal Minds	
C-SPAN	1979	USA	English	Government proceedings and public affairs			
C-SPAN 2	1986	USA	English	Government proceedings and public affairs			
C-SPAN 3	2001	USA	English	Government proceedings and public affairs			
Canal (á)	1996	Argentina	Spanish	Cultural, Documentary			Clarín Group, Artear
Canal D	1995	Canada	French	Crime, biographies, nature, and science			Bell Media
Canal+ Docs	2021	France	French	History and society documentary			Canal+ S.A.
Canal+ Dokument	2019	Poland	Polish	History and society documentary			Canal+ S.A.
Canal+ Discover	2021	Ethiopia	Oromo	History and society documentary			Canal+ S.A.
Canal+ Discover	2021	Ethiopia	Amharic	History and society documentary			Canal+ S.A.
Canal+ Su Sann	2018	Myanmar	Burmese	History and society documentary			Canal+ S.A.
CCTV-9	2011	China	It has one editions: one in Chinese for mainland China.	Documentary shows			CCTV
CGTN Documentary	2016	China	It has one editions: one in English for international broadcasting.	Documentary shows			CGTN
CMT (Canada)	1995	Canada	English	Country music, country music videos		Blue Collar Comedy Tour, Canadian Country Music Awards, CMT Music Awards	
CNBC	1989	USA	English	Business news, financial news			Versant
CNN	1980	USA	English	United States cable news, documentaries	Accused of both conservative and liberal bias in news	News covering both conservative and liberal topics	Skydance
Crime and Investigation Network	2004	USA	English	Crime-related			A+E Networks
ČT art	2013	Czech Republic	Czech	Documentary, Culture, Arts, Music			Czech Television
CTV Nature Channel	2001	Canada	English	Science, nature, and history documentary programs			Bell Media
CTV Speed Channel	2005	Canada	English	Automotive industry and transportation documentary programs			Bell Media
CTV Wild Channel	2001	Canada	English	Wildlife, animals, relation between humans and animals documentary programs			Bell Media
Da Vinci Learning	2007	Germany	English	History, sociology, biology, physics documentary			
DD National	1957	India	Hindi				Prasar Bharati
DD Bharati	1985	India	Hindi	History			Prasar Bharati
Destination America	1996	USA	English	Traveling, how-to travel, hotel and cities touring, lifestyle, history	Speculative fiction		Skydance
Digi Animal World	2012	Romania	Romanian	Nature and wildlife documentary			Digi Communications
Digi World	2012	Romania	Romanian	History and society documentary			Digi Communications
Discovery Channel	1985	USA	English	Popular science, technology and history	Reality shows, speculative fiction (time-travel, alternate universes, the paranormal, etc.), speculative fiction	MythBusters, Daily Planet, Curiosity, The Big Brain Theory: Pure Genius, Frozen Planet, Life	Skydance
Discovery Historia	2006	Poland	Polish	History			TVN Grupa Skydance
Discovery History	1999	UK	English	History			Skydance UK
Discovery Life	2011	USA	English	Fitness and health			Skydance UK
Discovery Theater	2002	USA	Spanish, Portuguese	Culture, Science			Skydance Latin America
Discovery World	1998	USA	English	Travel, culture and history	Replaced by DTX in Europe		Skydance
Documentales por Movistar Plus+	2023	Spain	Spanish	History and society documentary			Telefónica
Documentary Channel	2001	Canada	English	Documentary films			CBC
DTour	1997	Canada	English	Travel, lifestyle			Corus Entertainment
Encore	1991	USA	English	Theatrically released feature films (older to more recent), TV shows (on some channels)			
Encuentro	2007	Argentina	Spanish	History, science and general culture			
Epic	2014	India	Hindi, English	Infotainment, Travel			
Focus	2012	Italy	Italian	Documentaries, programming			Mediaset
Film & Arts	1996	Argentina	Spanish, Portuguese	Documentary, Movies, Culture, Arts, Music, Theater			AMC Networks International Latin America
Food Food	2006	India	Hindi	Food, Cooking			
Food Network	1993	USA	English	Food, cooking, cuisine, the food industry			Skydance
Food Network (Canada)	2000	Canada	English	Food, cooking, cuisine, the food industry			Corus Entertainment
Fox News Channel	1996	USA	English	United States cable news	Accused of conservative bias in news although this has been stated as unsubstantiated by members of Fox News		Fox Corporation
France 4	2005	France	French	Documentary, Culture, Arts, Music			France Télévisions
France 5	1994	France	French	Documentaries, educational programming			France Télévisions
France.tv Docs	2024	France	French	Documentary			France Télévisions
FYI	1999	USA	English	Biographical shows	Reality shows, speculative fiction (curses, alien and ghost encounters)	Biography	A+E Networks
Geo Television	2014	Germany	German	Documentary, science, history, nature			RTL Group
HGTV	1994	USA	English	How-to shows with a focus on home improvement, gardening, remodeling and crafts			Skydance
Histoire TV	1997	France	French	Documentary programming about history			Groupe TF1
Historia	2000	Canada	French	Historic dramas, documentaries, movies, human interests programs			A+E Networks
History	1995	USA	English	Documentary and historical fiction series	Reality shows, speculative documentaries (Ancient Aliens), apocalypse shows, US history, non-historic reality shows, fairly homogeneous viewpoint, concentrated program topics (World War II,	Museum Secrets, Ancients Behaving Badly	A+E Networks
History (Canada)	1997	Canada	English	Documentary and historical fiction series	Reality shows, apocalypse shows, speculative fiction		A+E Networks
HLN	1984	USA	English	30-minute newscast	Tabloid, Crime, opinion, and entertainment news-related programming	Morning Express with Robin Meade	Skydance
ICI ARTV	2001	Canada	French	Documentary, culture, arts and music			CBC
ICI Explora	2012	Canada	French	Science, environment, nature and health			CBC
Investigation	2013	Canada	French	Investigation and justice documentary			Bell Media
Investigation Discovery	1996	USA	English	Crime-related			Skydance
IRIB Mostanad	2011	Iran	Persian	Culture, arts, society, politics, history, wilderness, nature and the Iran–Iraq War			IRIB
Italiana	2026	Italy	Italian	Culture, Cuisine and Tourism			RAI
JOJ Svet	2023	Slovakia	Slovak	Documentary, science, history, nature			J&T Enterprise
Kabel Eins Doku	2016	Germany	German	Documentary, science, history, nature			ProSiebenSat.1 Media
Knowledge Network	1981	Canada	English	Politics, culture, history, arts, music, health, parenting, and science			
Kunskapskanalen	2004	Sweden	Swedish	Government proceedings, Educational			SVT
M5	2016	Hungary	Hungarian	Documentary, Culture, Arts, Music			MTVA
Magenta History	2016	Greece	Greek	Documentary and historical fiction series			OTE
MCM	1989	France	French	Music videos (popular music, French music)	Reality shows, horror series, anime shows		
Military History	1999	USA	English	World War II, wars, generals			A+E Networks
MS NOW	1996	USA	English	Documentary in current affairs			Versant
MTV India (previously MTV3 Fakta)	2006	India	Hindi	Documentaries, Music			JioStar
MysteryX	2026	UK	English	Documentary and sci-fi series			A+E Networks
N24 Doku	2016	Germany	German	Documentary, science, history, nature			WeltN24
National Geographic	1997	USA	English	Nature, culture, science, engineering & technology, history & society	Reality shows/stereotypes (Navajo, Southerners shows, the Amish and other minority groups) and apocalypse shows	Explorer, Taboo	The Walt Disney Company
Nat Geo Music	2007	Italy, India	English	Documentaries about cultures and music around the world			The Walt Disney Company
National Geographic Wild	2010	Hong Kong, India	English	Wildlife, natural history			The Walt Disney Company
National Geographic Adventure	1994	Singapore	English	Outdoor, travel and exploration			The Walt Disney Company
OLN	1997	Canada	English	Fact-based outdoor adventure shows	Speculative fiction (aliens, ghosts, monsters, paranormal), reality shows, conspiracy theories	Departures, Wild Things with Dominic Monaghan, Duck Commander, Survivorman, Mantracker	
Paramount Network	1983	USA	English	A movie channel focusing primarily on theatrical and original made-for-TV films.	Originally founded as TNN, rebranded as Spike TV, now Paramount		Skydance
PBS	1970	USA	English	fine arts, drama, science, history, music, public affairs, independent films, home improvement, interviews	Accused of anti-Communist and liberal point-of-view		
Phoenix	1997	Germany	German	Documentaries, news broadcasts, special events, discussion programmes			ARD, ZDF
Planète+	1988	France	French	Documentaries			Canal+ S.A.
Planète+	2021	Poland	Polish	Documentaries			Canal+ S.A.
Planète+ Aventure	1998	France	French	Documentaries programming about adventures			Canal+ S.A.
Planète+ Crime	2007	France	French	Documentaries programming about investigation and justice			Canal+ S.A.
Polsat Doku	2017	Poland	Polish	Documentaries			Telewizja Polsat
Polsat X	2025	Poland	Polish	Adventures and science documentary			Telewizja Polsat
Prima History	2023	Romania	Romanian	Documentary focuses in History			Clever Group
Prima World & Travel	2024	Romania	Romanian	Documentary focuses in Traveling			Clever Group
Prima Zoom	2013	Czech Republic	Czech	Documentary, science, history, nature			FTV Prima
Rai 5	2010	Italy	Italian	Documentary, Culture, Arts, Music			RAI
Rai Storia	2009	Italy	Italian	Historical events, occasionally with current relevance			RAI
Real Crime	2005	Australia	English	Crime-related			Foxtel Networks
Real History	1996	Australia	English	Documentary and historical fiction series			Foxtel Networks
Real Life	2023	Australia	English	Observational documentary			Foxtel Networks
RMC Découverte	2012	France	French	Documentary, men's interest			RMC BFM
RMC Story	2012	France	French	Documentary, science, history, nature			RMC BFM
RT Documentary	2011	Russia	English, Russian	Russia			ANO TV-Novosti
RTS Nauka	2020	Serbia	Serbian	Documentary, Nature, Science			RTS
RTS Trezor	2016	Serbia	Serbian	Documentary, History			RTS
Russian Travel Guide	2009	Russia	English, Russian, Turkish	Nature, science, culture, and history of the Russian Federation			
Science	1996	USA	English	Space, technology and science	Speculative fiction, non- science shows	The Challenger Disaster, How Do They Do It?, How It's Made, How The Universe Works, Wonders of Life	Skydance
Showcase	1995	Canada	English	Canadian and worldwide independent films, drama, comedy, mini-series	American shows and movies		
Smithsonian Channel	2007	USA	English	Culture, science and historical documentary			Skydance
Sky Adventure	2025	Italy	Italian	Adventures and extreme sport documentary			Sky Group
Sky Arts	2007	UK	English	Arts including, theatrical performances, movies, documentaries and music			Sky Group
Sky Arte	2012	Italy	Italian	Arts including, theatrical performances, movies, documentaries and music			Sky Group
Sky Classica	1997	Italy	Italian	Music concerts and culture documentaries			Sky Group
Sky Documentaries	2020	UK	English	History and society documentary			Sky Group
Sky Documentaries	2021	Germany	German	History and society documentary			Sky Group
Sky Documentaries	2021	Italy	Italian	History and society documentary			Sky Group
Sky Crime	2019	UK	English	Investigation and justice documentary			Sky Group
Sky Crime	2021	Germany	German	Investigation and justice documentary			Sky Group
Sky Crime	2023	Italy	Italian	Investigation and justice documentary			Sky Group
Sky History	2020	UK	English	Documentary and historical fiction series		Museum Secrets, Ancients Behaving Badly	Sky Group
Sky Nature	2020	UK	English	Nature and wildlife documentary			Sky Group
Sky Nature	2021	Germany	German	Nature and wildlife documentary			Sky Group
Sky Nature	2021	Italy	Italian	Nature and wildlife documentary			Sky Group
Sky Arts	2004	NZ	English	Arts including, theatrical performances, movies, documentaries and music			Sky Network Television
Sky Factual	2026	NZ	English	History and society documentary			Sky Network Television
Space	1997	Canada	English	Science fiction, space-related programming	Reality shows, fantasy, horror, paranormal	InnerSPACE, Star Trek: The Next Generation, Star Trek: Voyager, Stargate Universe, Stargate Atlantis, Stargate SG-1, Doctor Who	
TGRT Belgesel	2010	Turkey	Turkish	Documentary			İhlas Yayın Holding
Travel Channel	1987	USA	English	Traveling, how-to travel, hotel and cities touring	Paranormal (haunted places, ghosts)	Edge of America, Off Limits,	Skydance
TruTV	1991	USA	English	Legal programming	Reality shows		Skydance
TRT Belgesel	2009	Turkey	Turkish	Documentary			Türkiye Radyo ve Televizyon Kurumu
TV4 Fakta	2005	Sweden	Swedish	Science			TV4 AB
TVP Historia	2005	Poland	Polish	Documentary, History			Telewizja Polska
TVP Kultura	2007	Poland	Polish	Documentary, Culture, Arts, Music			Telewizja Polska
TVP Dokument	2020	Poland	Polish	Documentary			Telewizja Polska
TVP Nauka	2022	Poland	Polish	Documentary, Nature, Science			Telewizja Polska
U&Eden	2004	UK	English	Documentary, Nature			UKTV (BBC Studios)
U&Yesterday	2004	UK	English	Documentary, History			UKTV (BBC Studios)
Viasat Explorer	2002	Sweden	English	Wild animals, extreme sports, adventure, travel and technology			Viasat World LTD
Viasat History	2004	Sweden	English	History, culture and society			Viasat World LTD
Viasat Nature	1994	Sweden	Swedish, Danish, Norwegian	Nature and wildlife			Viasat World LTD
Viasat True Crime	2024	Sweden	English, Polish, Czech, Slovak	Crime-related, Investigation and justice documentary			Viasat World LTD
ViJu Explorer	2023	Russia	Russian	Wild animals, extreme sports, adventure, travel and technology			Viasat Russia
ViJu History	2023	Russia	Russian	History, culture and society			Viasat Russia
ViJu Nature	2023	Russia	Russian	Nature and wildlife			Viasat Russia
W Network	1995	Canada	English	Women-oriented feminist programming	Primetime movies		
The Weather Channel	1982	USA	English	Weather news and information	Documentary programs		
The Weather Network	1988	Canada	English	Weather news and information			
TVR Cultural	2002 (original); 2022 (relaunch)	Romania	Romanian	Documentary, Culture, Arts, Music			Televiziunea Română
Ushuaïa TV	2005	France	French	Documentary programming about nature			Groupe TF1
YLE Teema Fem	2017	Finland	Finnish	Documentary, Culture, Arts, Music			YLE
ZDFinfo	1997	Germany	German				ZDF
Zing	2006	India	Hindi	Indian Music			Zee Entertainment

== See also ==
- Category:Documentary television channels
- Channel drift
