= Jones! =

Jones
- Country: New Zealand

Programming
- Picture format: 1080i (HDTV) 16:9

Ownership
- Owner: Sky Network Television
- Sister channels: Sky Open; Sky Justice; Sky Suspect; Sky Factual; Sky Movies; Sky Drama; Sky Comedy; Sky Kids

History
- Launched: 13 May 2013; 13 years ago

Links
- Website: Official Site

Availability

Streaming media
- Sky Go: skygo.co.nz

Jones and Jones! too are two television channels available on the Sky platform, launched in 2013 and 2017, respectively. Both channels specialise in acquired vintage programming from overseas, usually British and American.

== History ==
The main Jones! channel started broadcasting on 13 May 2013, with the aim of airing classic TV series whose rights were not held by channels such as UKTV and Comedy Central. From the beginning, it aired both American and British titles. Sunday Star-Times reporter Grant Smithies initially expressed outrage over the new channel, to the extent that he considered a "cheap cash-in" for baby boomer nostalgia, even invoking the scene in Happy Days where Fonzie jumped the shark to justify such a gimmick. However, in his piece for the newspaper, he eventually changed his tone and considered the channel to be "more comfort food than cutting edge". The channel's identity was designed by Brandspank.

A second channel, Jones! too, started broadcasting in June 2017. On 3 February 2019, the channel started airing a weekly block of Britcoms on Sunday nights.
