= HBO (New Zealand) =

- Final logo used from 2024 to 2026
- Country: New Zealand
- Headquarters: Auckland, New Zealand

Programming
- Language: English
- Picture format: 1080i (HDTV) 16:9

Ownership
- Parent: Home Box Office, Inc. (managed by Sky Network Television)

History
- Launched: 31 October 2011; 15 years ago (SoHo); 7 November 2018; 8 years ago (SoHo2)
- Closed: 16 March 2021; 5 years ago (SoHo2); 16 June 2026; 5 months ago (SoHo/HBO)
- Replaced by: Sky Drama
- Former names: SoHo (2011–2024)

HBO was a premium entertainment channel in New Zealand available on Sky New Zealand. The channel broadcasts HBO Original programming. It was previously called SoHo until late October 2024 and HBO until June 16, 2026.

== History ==
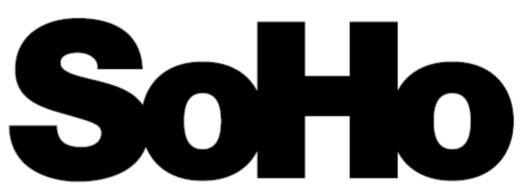
SoHo logo used from 2011 to 2024

The channel launched on 31 October 2011, as SoHo screening shows from American cable networks Showtime, AMC, Starz, HBO and FX, which were themselves not available in New Zealand. It also broadcast shows from Britain, especially from the BBC, and also broadcast films. The channel was initially built upon its contract with HBO, but has since broadened its content to include series from other sources.

In October 2024, Sky confirmed that the channel would be rebranded as HBO featuring exclusively HBO content, effective 30 October 2024.

Prior to the launch of HBO Max as a standalone streaming service in New Zealand on 16 June 2026, the HBO channel was closed in mid-June. In addition, the HBO Max streaming hub content on Sky Go and the Neon streaming service were removed.

== Services ==
There was also a SoHo channel in Australia, which launched on 20 August 2012. It closed down on 4 October 2016, and was replaced by Binge.

A sister channel, SoHo2 launched on 7 November 2018.

SoHo2 was closed on 16 March 2021 and all the content was moved to the SoHo channel.

On 22 October 2024, Sky New Zealand announced that SoHo would be revamped as a linear HBO channel showing HBO Original content, effective 30 October. The HBO channel is available on Sky Box, Sky Pod and Sky Go. This change accompanied a new partnership between Sky and Warner Bros. Discovery that would allow the former to remain the exclusive distributor of HBO and Max content in New Zealand.

Prior to the launch of the standalone HBO Max streaming service on 16 June 2026, the HBO channel was closed while all HBO Max content on Sky Go and Neon were removed.

== Content ==
In 2022, SoHo distributed the Game of Thrones prequel series House of the Dragon alongside Sky's streaming service Neon.

Effective 30 October 2024, the revamped HBO channel featured HBO Original content exclusively. Other non-HBO and WBD shows that previously aired on SoHo were transferred to Sky's other entertainment channels, Sky 5 and Vibe.
