= Sky Factual =

- Country: New Zealand

Programming
- Picture format: 1080i (HDTV) 16:9

Ownership
- Owner: Sky Network Television
- Sister channels: Sky Open; Sky 5 Vibe; Jones! Sky Movies; Sky Drama; Sky Comedy; Sky Kids

History
- Launched: 27 August 2026; 56 days ago

Links
- Website: Official Site

Availability

Streaming media
- Sky Go: skygo.co.nz

Sky Factual is a television channel in New Zealand available on Sky, launched on 27 August 2026.

Its line-up consists of factual programming, both documentary and reality. It is available on the Sky Entertainment package on channel 14.

== History ==
Sky Factual was announced in late July 2026, set for a 27 August launch.

The channel dedicates most of its airtime to content such as Anthony Bourdain: Parts Unknown, The Red Stag Timber Hunters Club, Emergency, 999: On The Front Line and Louis Theroux’s Weird Weekends, as well as documentaries on pop culture. Primetime is reserved for high-end titles, often recent productions.
