= Sky Kids (New Zealand TV channel) =

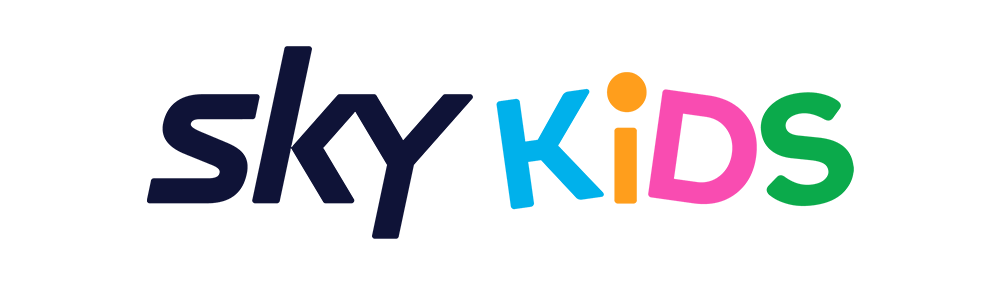
- Country: New Zealand

Programming
- Picture format: 1080i (HDTV) 16:9

Ownership
- Owner: Sky Network Television
- Sister channels: Sky Open; Sky Justice; Sky Suspect; Jones! Sky Movies; Sky Comedy; Sky Drama

History
- Launched: 2 December 2025; 11 months ago
- Replaced: Nickelodeon and Nick Jr. (programming); Cartoon Network (channel slot)

Links
- Website: Official Site

Availability

Streaming media
- Sky Go: skygo.co.nz

Sky Kids is a television channel in New Zealand available on Sky, launched on 2 December 2025.

Sky Kids's programmes are mostly sourced from US cable networks Nickelodeon and Nick Jr. and serves as a replacement to both channels, which were removed per the end of its contract with Paramount, its programming is complemented by acquisitions. The channel is available on channel 101.

== History ==
=== Background ===
Nickelodeon as a channel had been present in New Zealand since 2000, when it launched as a basic channel on its digital service. This later led to the creation of a dedicated local feed on 1 August 2006. This feed closed on 1 December 2010, as part of the announcement of the closure of the offices in Auckland and the move of its staff to Sydney, whereafter Sky replaced it with the Australian feed. In tandem with this decision, Sky added Nick Jr. to its offer.

In July 2025, Sky announced the removal of the Paramount networks from its offer after refusing to sign a new contract, putting the Nickelodeon channels off the service later in the year.

=== Launch ===
On 10 November 2025, Sky announced the creation of Sky Kids to compensate for the loss of the Paramount channels. An NZ On Air study released the previous week shows that 11% of kids in New Zealand still watch Sky channels, far behind YouTube, at 69%. Programming would be dayparted into a morning block for pre-schoolers and an afterschool block for older kids. The Nickelodeon content will be complemented by local productions.

== Programming ==
Information correct as of the time of the announcement.

=== Local output ===
- Katie's Kuri
- The Last Moa
- Kiri & Lou
- The Drawing Show
- Extreme Cake Sports
- Secrets at Red Rocks
- Tākaro Tribe
- Kea Kids News
- The Barefoot Bandits
- The Adventures of Tumeke Space
- Jandal Burn

=== From Nick Jr. ===
- Blaze and the Monster Machines
- Dora
- Paw Patrol
- Blue's Clues & You!
- Butterbean's Café
- Rubble & Crew
- Top Wing
- Shimmer & Shine

=== From Nickelodeon ===
- SpongeBob SquarePants
- Teenage Mutant Ninja Turtles (2012)
- The Loud House
- CatDog
- Avatar: The Last Airbender
- Rugrats
- Tales of the Teenage Mutant Ninja Turtles
- Hey Arnold!
- Avatar: Seven Havens

=== From DreamWorks Animation Television/Universal Animation ===
- The Epic Tales of Captain Underpants
- Kung Fu Panda: The Paws of Destiny
- She-Ra and the Princesses of Power
- Trolls: The Beat Goes On!
- Curious George (TV series)
- Trolls:TrollsTopia
- The Croods: Family Tree
- DreamWorks Dragons: The Nine Realms

=== Australian shows ===
- Bananas in Pyjamas
- Ready, Steady, Wiggle!
- Teeny Tiny Stevies
- Play School Nursery Rhyme News Time
- Play School Story Time
- Wiggle and Learn
- Big Words, Small Stories
- Reef School
- Beep and Mort
- Play School Art Crew
- Play School Science Time
- The Wiggles The Tree of Wisdom
- Fizzy and Suds
- Wildlifers
- The Wonder Gang

=== French shows ===
- Zoe and Milo
- Lana Longbeard
- Ernest and Rebecca
- Roger
- Galactic Agency
- Jade Armor
- Plankton Invasion

=== British shows ===
- Isadora Moon
- Stories From Backwoods
- Emerald
- Crookhaven (TV series)

=== Japanese shows (2026–present) ===
- Blue Lock
- Kuma Kuma Kuma Bear
- Welcome to Demon School! Iruma-kun

== Subsequent additions (post-launch) ==
=== From Nickelodeon ===
- The Angry Beavers
- Bubble Guppies
- The Fairly OddParents
- The Wild Thornberrys

=== From DreamWorks Animation Television ===
- DreamWorks Dragons: Rescue Riders
