= SKY 1 =

SKY 1 may refer to:

- Sky One in England
- Sky 5 in New Zealand, formerly Sky 1
