= Eve Ridley =

English actress (born 2011)

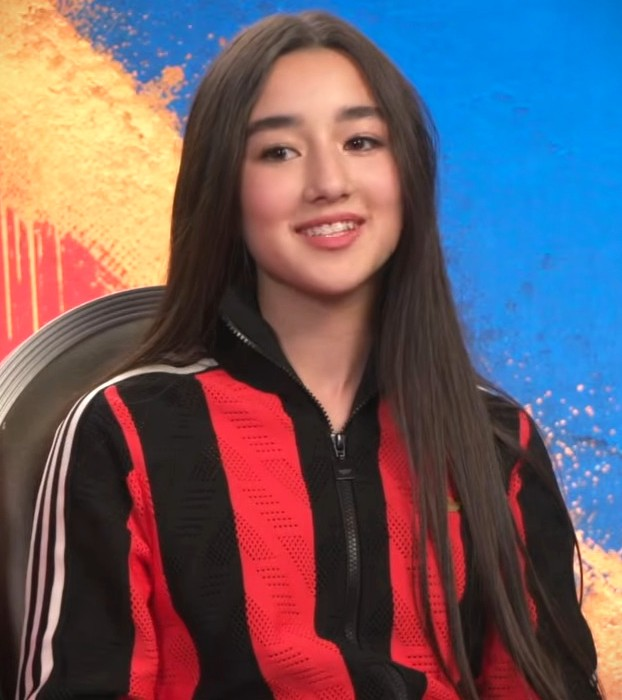
- Ridley in 2026
- Born: 13 December 2011 (age 14); Sunderland, Tyne and Wear, England
- Years active: 2020–present

Eve Ridley (born 13 December 2011) is an English child actress. She is best known for her role as Ruthye Marye Knoll in the film Supergirl (2026). She is also known for her television, voice and stage work.

== Early life ==
Ridley is from Sunderland. Her maternal grandmother is Filipino. Ridley trained at Stagebox in Leeds, a performing arts organisation.

== Career ==
Ridley began her career with a voice role in the Channel 5 animated series Peppa Pig. In 2022, Ridley played young Éponine on the UK tour of the musical Les Misérables and made her live action television debut in an episode of the BBC One medical soap opera Casualty.

Announced in June 2022, Ridley landed her first recurring television role as Follower in the Netflix science fiction series 3 Body Problem, which was premiered in March 2024. She voiced Princess Delphina in the Sky Kids animated series Isadora Moon and reprised her role in the spinoff series Emerald. In addition, she began voicing Maple Monkey in the animated series Little Baby Bum: Music Time.

Ridley appeared in the fourth series of the Netflix fantasy series The Witcher in 2025 as young Nimue (the older version played by Sha Dessi). She is set to have a voice role in the second series of the animated series Blue Eye Samurai, also on Netflix. Announced in October 2024, Ridley starred in the 2026 DC Universe (DCU) film Supergirl (originally titled Supergirl: Woman of Tomorrow).

== Filmography ==
=== Film ===
| Year | Title | Role | Notes |
|---|---|---|---|
| 2026 | Supergirl | Ruthye Marye Knoll | |

=== Television ===
| Year | Title | Role | Notes |
|---|---|---|---|
| 2020 | Peppa Pig | Wendy Wolf | Voice role |
| 2022 | Casualty | Saffy Blackmore | Episode: "Just Between Us" |
| 2023–2024 | Little Baby Bum: Music Time | Maple Monkey | Voice role, 15 episodes |
| 2024 | 3 Body Problem | Follower | 2 episodes |
| 2024 | Isadora Moon | Princess Delphina | Voice role, 2 episodes |
| 2025 | The Witcher | Young Nimue | Episode: "What Doesn't Kill You Makes You Stronger" |
| 2025 | Emerald | Princess Delphina | Main voice role |
