= Lightbox (service) =

Former streaming service

- Lightbox's Logo
- Type: Subsidiary
- Industry: Electronic commerce
- Founded: 2014
- Defunct: 6 July 2020
- Fate: Merged into Neon
- Headquarters: Auckland, New Zealand
- Area served: New Zealand
- Products: Internet streaming
- Parent: Sky Network Television Limited
- Website: lightbox.co.nz

Lightbox was a New Zealand subscription video on demand (SVOD) service offering a selection of television shows over a range of devices. The service was owned by national telecommunications provider Spark New Zealand but was purchased by satellite company Sky Television in December 2019. On 7 July 2020, Sky merged Lightbox into its own streaming service Neon using the existing streaming platform of Lightbox. Hema Patel was the general manager director of Lightbox.

== History ==
In June 2014, Spark announced Lightbox (then called ShowmeTV), which allowed New Zealanders to stream TV shows, including Mad Men, Better Call Saul and Vikings. It was launched in August 2014.

In January 2015, Lightbox partnered with Coliseum Sports Media to deliver a subscription-based sports streaming service called Lightbox Sport. Lightbox Sport included golf, English Premier League football and French Top 14 rugby.

By March 2015, Lightbox faced competition from SVOD services Quickflix, Netflix and Neon.

In October 2019, a Horizon Research survey of more than 1,000 New Zealanders found that 18% of those surveyed subscribed to Lightbox. By contrast, 59% subscribed to TVNZ OnDemand, 56% to Netflix, 29% to Sky, 28% to ThreeNow and 7% to Neon.

In mid-December 2019, it was announced that Spark would be selling the Lightbox streaming service to the satellite television company Sky Television. Sky planned to merge Lightbox into its own online streaming service Neon on 7 July 2020. Spark also partnered with Sky to make the service available to Spark customers through the telecommunication company's entertainment offers during the first half of 2020. As part of the agreement, Sky met the operational costs of merging the two streaming services.

In mid-June 2020, Sky announced that Lightbox would be merged into Neon on 7 July 2020. The merged service retained the Neon brand but continued using Lightbox's interface and features and includes content drawn from both Neon and the old Lightbox. Existing Spark customers can receive a NZ$9.95 discount.

On 7 July, Sky formally merged Neon and Lightbox, with the former Lightbox app being revamped as Neon. The revamped Neon platform incorporates content and several features from Lightbox including the ability to download films and shows onto devices, rent movies, and create user profiles.

== Services and content ==
Lightbox was available via their website on Windows 7, Windows 8 and OS X computers, and on a number of other devices including iOS, Android (version 4.2 and above), Apple TV using AirPlay, Android TV, Chromecast selected Samsung Smart TVs, and PlayStation 3 and PlayStation 4 consoles.

Lightbox's content included the New Zealand animated comedy series Bro'Town and the Hulu webseries The Handmaid's Tale.
