= Craig Heatley =

New Zealand businessman

Craig Heatley CNZM
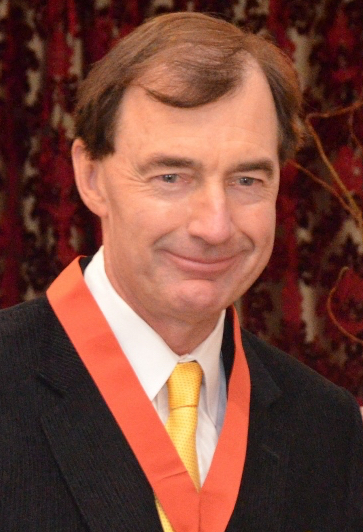
- Heatley in 2013
- Born: 29 May 1956 (age 70); Lower Hutt, New Zealand
- Occupations: Businessman, philanthropist
- Known for: Sky Television, Rainbow Corporation, Philanthropy,
- Height: 6 ft 4 in (193 cm)
- Children: Three sons, one daughter
- Awards: Companion of the New Zealand Order of Merit (2013); New Zealand Entrepreneur of the Year (2012)

Craig Leonard Heatley CNZM (born 29 May 1956) is a New Zealand businessman, entrepreneur and philanthropist. He is one of the wealthiest men in New Zealand according to the New Zealand National Business Review.

== Career ==
Heatley set up Rainbow Corporation in the 1980s which had interests in Woolworths supermarkets, entertainment theme parks and property. Rainbow was acquired by Brierley Investments in the late 1980s to gain control of Rainbows' significant stake in Woolworths. Rainbow shareholders agreed to a stock swap deal worth $500 million, of which Heatley controlled 20%. Heatley was then appointed to the Brierley board.

He then set up Sky Network Television. Famously with a personal investment of only $1, he managed to turn it into New Zealand's only pay TV provider and one of the 10 largest New Zealand companies, whilst still retaining a 15% stake.

Heatley has since sold his stake in Sky Network Television, and now has diversified interests throughout New Zealand, Asia and the U.S. which include property, infrastructure, equities and aviation. He is also a major player in the New Zealand private equity and currency markets.

In the 2013 Queen's Birthday Honours, Heatley was appointed a Companion of the New Zealand Order of Merit, for services to business.

== Other ==
He was born in Lower Hutt and educated at Heretaunga College and the Victoria University of Wellington.

He is an aviator who owns several properties in New Zealand and the United States, as well as a Bombardier Global private jet valued at $30 million.

Heatley is a competitive amateur golfer who won the 2003 AT&T Pebble Beach National Pro-Am at Pebble Beach with professional golfer Phil Tataurangi, and the 2004 Alfred Dunhill Links Championship pro-am with professional golfer Fred Couples. He is a member of Augusta National Golf Club where he is Chairman of the Masters Tournament Media Committee.
