= Comedy Central (Australia and New Zealand) =

- Country: Australia
- Broadcast area: Australia, New Zealand
- Network: Comedy Central

Programming
- Language: English
- Picture format: 1080i (16:9 HDTV) (downscaled to 720p for the Australian feed)

Ownership
- Owner: Paramount Networks UK & Australia
- Sister channels: 10; 10 HD; 10 Comedy; 10 Drama; MTV; Club MTV; MTV Hits; MTV 80s Nickelodeon AU & NZ; Nickelodeon AU (free-to-air); Nick Jr. NickMusic

History
- Launched: 1 April 2009; 17 years ago (New Zealand); 1 April 2016; 10 years ago (Australia)
- Closed: 31 March 2025; 19 months ago (Australia); 2 December 2025; 11 months ago (New Zealand)
- Replaced by: Sky Comedy (New Zealand)

Links
- Website: www.comedycentral.com.au

Availability

Streaming media
- Sky Go (New Zealand): skygo.co.nz
- Paramount+ (Australia): paramountplus.com

Comedy Central was an Australian and New Zealand 24-hour linear subscription television channel dedicated to comedy programming owned by Paramount Skydance Corporation, launched on 1 April 2009 in New Zealand, and on 1 April 2016 in Australia. The channel was closed down in 2025.

The channel was exclusively broadcast on the Sky TV platform in New Zealand. It was also broadcast via Australian IPTV provider Fetch TV in Australia, and was one of the first Comedy Central franchises to be launched outside the United States. The channel had a strong blend of animation, stand-up and scripted programs. The core audience demographic covered the 15–48 age bracket. It featured well known international titles, as well as some local content. It had strong viewership and was one of the top entertainment channels on the Sky TV platform.

== History ==
On 29 February 2016, it was announced that following discussions since mid-2015, Fetch TV had finalised discussions with Viacom on Friday 26 February 2016 to launch Comedy Central. The launch came following increased local presence by Comedy Central. The channel, which would be advertisement free and be exclusively available via Fetch TV, would be broadcast from Australia. Viacom hired additional local personnel for operations. The launch of Comedy Central coincided with the initial closure of sister channel MTV Classic prior to its eventual rebrand.

On 15 February 2018, Comedy Central was made available in HD for Fetch TV customers.

Comedy Central programming was also available across Australia via the SVOD service Paramount+, which replaced 10 All Access on 11 August 2021.

On 31 March 2025, the channel closed down via Fetch TV, with its programming moving to Paramount+ and 10 Comedy. In New Zealand, the channel was closed on 2 December, being replaced by Sky Comedy. The final programme to air was the South Park episode "White People Renovating Houses".

== Programming ==
The network aired content from its U.S. counterpart, with 90% of the programming at launch coming from the ViacomCBS library, in addition to local productions – which initially was in short form. Although Viacom had existing agreements with the Foxtel-owned the Comedy Channel, content was made available to both Comedy Central and the Comedy Channel at the same time.

=== Original programming ===
- The Mike Nolan Show
- These New South Whales
- Trendy

=== Acquired programming ===
Some programmes available included:

- @midnight
- Adam Devine's House Party
- Alien News Desk
- American Dad!
- Another Period
- Aqua Teen Hunger Force
- Archer
- Are You Being Served?
- Balls of Steel
- Beavis and Butt-Head
- The Benny Hill Show
- The Big Bang Theory
- The Big Lez Show
- The Billy T James Show
- The Black Adder
- Bob's Burgers
- BoJack Horseman
- The Boondocks
- Bottom
- The Brak Show
- Broad City
- bro'Town
- Chappelle's Show
- The Cleveland Show
- Comedy Central Roast
- Community
- The Daily Show with Trevor Noah
- Digman!
- Drawn Together
- Drew Carey's Improv-A-Ganza
- Drunk History
- The Eric Andre Show
- Everybody Hates Chris
- Facejacker
- Family Guy
- Fonejacker
- Frasier
- The Fresh Prince of Bel-Air
- Friday Night Dinner
- Friends
- Full House
- Futurama
- The Half Hour
- Harvey Birdman, Attorney at Law
- Hogan's Heroes
- How I Met Your Mother
- Idiotsitter
- Impractical Jokers
- The Inbetweeners
- Inside Amy Schumer
- Key & Peele
- The King of Queens
- Live at the Apollo
- Malcolm in the Middle
- M*A*S*H
- The Middle
- The Movie Show
- Mr. Black
- My Name Is Earl
- Nathan for You
- The Nightly Show with Larry Wilmore
- Not Safe with Nikki Glaser
- The Office
- On the Buses
- Only Fools and Horses
- Regular Old Bogan
- Rick and Morty (Season 1–2)
- Robot Chicken
- Rude Tube
- Russell Howard's Good News
- Sassy the Sasquatch
- Saturday Night Live
- Saul of the Mole Men
- Sealab 2021
- Seinfeld
- The Simpsons
- Some Mothers Do 'Ave 'Em
- South Park (shared with FOX8)
- Space Ghost Coast to Coast
- Studio C
- SuperMansion
- Superstore
- Swift and Shift Couriers
- Tosh.0
- Two and a Half Men
- The Venture Bros.
- Workaholics
- Young Sheldon
