= The Big Lez Show =

Australian animated web-series

- Genre: Stoner comedy; Surreal comedy; Psychedelic; Sci-fi
- Created by: Jarrad Wright, Tom Hollis
- Written by: Jarrad Wright, Tom Hollis, Izak Whear
- Country of origin: Australia
- Original language: English
- No. of seasons: 4
- No. of episodes: 36

Original release
- Network: YouTube; Comedy Central Australia
- Release: 16 July 2012 – 26 January 2019

The Big Lez Show is an Australian stoner comedy web series created by Jarrad Wright. The show originally premiered on YouTube on 16 July 2012 and concluded on 26 January 2019. The show follows Big Lez, a humanoid alien living in the fictional Australian town of Brown Town, and the adventures he has with his friends and enemies.

The town of Brown Town is based on the New South Wales suburb of Tweed Head. It has numerous references, like the Tweed Head Lighthouse.

Initially uploaded on YouTube, the show quickly gained great popularity and developed a cult following. The premiere of its fourth season reached one million views within two months of being uploaded, and the show became such a success that a five-episode spin-off series entitled The Mike Nolan Show was commissioned by Comedy Central Australia. The spin-off premiered on 10 June 2016 and was co-written by Tom Hollis and Izak Whear.

The show has enjoyed vast popularity in its later years, with viewership soaring during the third season's run. As of November 2026, The Big Lez Show YouTube channel has over 377 million views, with episodes ranging from one to eleven million views.

== Premise ==
Big Lez is a humanoid alien who was banished from his home world, Kingdom Cum, and now lives in the fictional Australian town of Brown Town with his adopted son Quinton. He lives across the street from Norton, his brother and arch-enemy. His next-door neighbours are his friends Sassy and Donny, two mysterious and occasionally omniscient sasquatches, who are often the main instigators of the group's various misadventures. The show's plot initially revolves around Lez's plan to return to his home planet and later follows his war against his family and their army of Choomahs, a species of yellow monsters that are based on Homer Simpson. He is aided on his quests by several other characters including Mike “Nolzy" Nolan, a tradie who smokes cigarettes and Clarence, a fellow Kingdom Cumian and former scientist who was exiled into space after he mutated following an experiment gone wrong. He is often a physical and mental punching bag for the other characters. The show's content varies from drawing humour in mundane day-to-day activities to large, grand adventures.

== Episodes ==
Season	Episodes	First aired	Last aired	Platform
1	11	16 July 2012	28 January 2013	YouTube
2	10	4 March 2013	12 May 2014	YouTube
3	10	7 July 2014	21 August 2015	YouTube
4	5	10 March 2017	26 January 2019	YouTube

== Characters ==
=== Big Lez ===
Voiced by Jarrad Wright

Lezly "Big Lez" Mackerel is the show's titular character and protagonist. Lez was banished from his home planet Kingdom Cum alongside his brother Norton by their father, King Laranox. After his banishment, Lez settled on Earth in Brown Town, Australia and befriended many of the locals.

Lez is portrayed as a hot-tempered and pugnacious character to many, while remaining amiable and very loyal to his friends. He feels extreme animosity towards his brother Norton who lives opposite him, often going out of his way to irritate or upset him. He also holds his father King Laranox in high disdain. Lez generally sees his son Quinton as a burden and is frequently neglectful and emotionally abusive to him, however it is shown on occasion he does care about him deep down.

Lez frequently partakes in recreational drug use and will often join Sassy and his friends in smoking marijuana or taking psychedelic drugs.

As an alien from Kingdom Cum, Lez has many superhuman capabilities, such as super strength and endurance. All of the characters in The Big Lez Show who originate from Kingdom Cum experience similar abilities.

=== Norton ===
Voiced by Jarrad Wright

Norton Sparkles is Lez's brother, across the-street neighbour and archenemy. Lez's animosity for Norton is equally reciprocated; Norton tries to disrupt Lez's life and asserts himself onto Quinton as his uncle to spite Lez. Quinton will often take refuge in Norton's house when Lez is being abusive, where the two develop a friendship. He is the secondary antagonist in the show.

Norton is the second son of King Laranox and was banished to Earth alongside Lez. Norton is portrayed as a camp character and strong hints are made throughout the series to his sexuality, although it is never explicitly stated and sometimes actually denied. Norton possesses the same superhuman abilities as Lez but as he is younger, Lez's powers are slightly stronger.

Norton eventually met his demise by his brother Lez, via several gunshot wounds.

=== Quinton ===
Voiced by Jarrad Wright

Quinton Mackerel is Lez's adoptive son, who was abandoned on his doorstep as an orphan. Lez only adopted Quinton upon realising the money he could make from child support payments. Quinton is severely neglected by his father Lez and sometimes runs away to Norton's house in times of need. Quinton expresses dislike of his father frequently and often curses at him, although he is also usually respectful and fearful of his father's authority. Unlike most of the people surrounding him, Quinton is sceptical of drugs and is reluctant to take any from Lez and Sassy's gang, albeit did smoke marijuana with them in Lez's cupboard on one occasion. In later series and Mike Nolan's Long Weekend, Quinton matures and becomes braver. In the Donny and Clarence show, he is shown to be much older compared to the previous seasons, resembling more of a teenager.

=== Sassy the Sasquatch ===
Voiced by Jarrad Wright

Sassy the Sasquatch is an anthropomorphic sasquatch, Lez's friend and next-door-neighbour. An extreme drug user, Sassy is in a near-perpetual state of intoxication and is rarely seen in the show without some form of drug in his hand. Despite this, Sassy often falsely denies his drug use, ironically referring to other characters as "druggos". Sassy lives in a run-down wooden shack next door to Lez along with four of his friends, Donny, Wayne-O, Scruffy and Owly. While all of Sassy's friends are hardcore drug users as well, Sassy acts as the ringleader of the group and is usually the one persuading others to take drugs with him.

Out of all the characters in the show, Sassy is one of the most easy-going, approachable and friendly. Sassy will often engage in conversation with people who his friends would otherwise ignore such as Clarence or Quinton. Sassy suffers from amnesia due to his heavy drug use and regularly talks using nonsensical words in his speech.

It is continually implied throughout the series that Sassy and the other sasquatches are interdimensional beings capable of a multitude of incredible feats. To date, though, Sassy has only been seen to use his powers in order to conjure food for himself, seemingly repair a bong he smashes and recover a thrown football from the ocean and fly with his powers. He tends to retort his catchphrase of "Wadiyatalkinabeet?" (contracted "what are you talking about?"), when questioned about these abilities by other characters, never confirming or denying his powers.

=== Donny the Dealer ===
Voiced by Jarrad Wright

Donny the Dealer, a paler-coloured sasquatch than Sassy, is Sassy's housemate and lifelong friend. Donny owns the local shop and acts as his housemates' arms and drug dealer, procuring a range of items over the series ranging from a flying saucer to an intercontinental ballistic missile. He is also friends with other locals, such as Mike and Lez, sharing their passions for drugs and violence. He seems to be the most sadistic of the sasquatches, having a more irritable personality than his perpetually stoned friends Sassy and Wayne-O, although he is fiercely loyal to his friends and Brown Town in general.

He effectively owns Clarence, whom he uses as an errand boy and shop hand, as well as regularly abusing his regenerative powers using him as target practice.

It was assumed that Donny's nickname, the dealer, came from his position as the dealer for Browntown, but it was revealed in the sequel series, Sassy the Sasquatch, that this was not the case. When Sassy first met Donny, in the prehistoric era, Sassy traded a coconut for some drugs, and after the trade, dubbed him "Donny the dealer". When Sassy touched Donny, he transformed from a caveman-like state to his usual intelligent, English-speaking personality.

=== Mike Nolan ===
Voiced by Jarrad Wright

Mike Nolan, often nicknamed "Nolzy" is a local resident of Brown Town and self described "jack of all trades", regarding any work other than 'cashies' as being unworthy of his time. Mike works at various places around Brown Town and is close friends with the rest of the main cast. Much like them, Mike is an avid fan of recreational drug use, as well as a heavy smoker, having chain-smoked since the age of 4 years old. He and Quinton are the only two human members of the main cast, and as such are shown to usually be affected to a greater degree by the constant substance abuse partaken in by the group.

He is stated to be 52 years old at the time of Season 1, making him approximately 55 at the time of Long Weekend. Despite his age and constant drug abuse, and much like the other characters on the show, he is shown to be paradoxically athletic, capable of a multitude of physical feats in which he does not appear to sustain injury or exert himself.

Mike is the protagonist and title character of the Comedy Central Australia spin-off series The Mike Nolan Show, and the independently produced Mike Nolan's Long Weekend, which was released first for rental on Vimeo, and subsequently for free on YouTube.

=== Clarence ===
Voiced by Jarrad Wright

Dr. Clarence Claymore is a former denizen of Kingdom Cum, where he worked as a high-profile scientist. After an experiment involving his own DNA backfired on him, his body underwent severe mutations, transforming him into a green-skinned, shrivelled, potato-headed creature. He was banished from Kingdom Cum and ejected into space along with the remains of his failed experiment. After crash landing on an island off the coast of Australia, Clarence accidentally drops his experimental fluid into a large ravine, which mutates over time and becomes the source of the Choomahs. While on what then becomes Choomah Island, Clarence meets Sassy and Donny who offer him a home in Brown Town.

Clarence works as the local mailman in Brown Town as well as a general dogsbody in Donny's shop. Clarence is one of the most good-natured and kind people in the show but his attempts at friendship are usually not reciprocated as most of the other characters find him irritating and annoying. In particular, Lez and Donny are very hostile towards Clarence. At the end of Choomah Island 3, Donny appears to finally gain some respect for Clarence, as he finally loses his seemingly endless temper and snaps at him. Presumably this does not last, as he is back to being regularly abused by every character by the start of Mike Nolan's Long Weekend, which is set two years after the events of Choomah Island 3.

After being mutated via his botched experiment, Clarence gained supernatural powers; most notably, a regenerative healing factor, allowing him to withstand and heal from any sort of injury. However, the pain he suffers, both physically and emotionally, is felt on a more extreme level, and takes a longer amount of time to dissipate. This does not prevent the other main characters regularly maiming, shooting and generally injuring Clarence at any opportunity which arises, both accidentally, and purposefully.

=== Ellis "Warning Guy" Warnington ===
Voiced by Jarrad Wright

Ellis Warnington, also known as Warning Guy, is introduced as a Scottish lifeguard working at Brown Town's local beach, killing a shark that was menacing Lez and Quinton. He befriends Lez and the group after this incident. He tells Lez that he also fights all manner of aquatic creatures including a kraken, giving clues to his real identity.

In Choomah Island 2, Warning Guy is revealed to be one of the six Kingdom Cum-ians that still remain during a fight with King Laranox's newly chosen heir, Cecil the Sasquatch, using his powers to his advantage, including flight and super strength.

He has a cousin who is also a Kingdom Cum-ian named Sergio Warnington (voiced by Izak Whear), who considers himself a big game hunter, first coming into play in the story when he spots reports and photographs of the Choomahs online.

=== King Laranox ===
Voiced by Tommo Graham

King Laranox is the King of Kingdom Cum, the father of Lezly Mackerel and Norton Sparkles, he banishes them both from their home planet after they both attempt to sabotage each other's chances of becoming the next king. He seems to be a smart, ruthless and volatile ruler, as his henchmen seem to be both afraid of him and respect his leadership, but his actions also caused the events of the series to unfold. He is the main antagonist in the show.

Next to nothing is known about King Laranox's life before banishing Lez and Norton from Kingdom Cum, we can only assume his father was also king before him, or a possible coup from a previous dynasty.

Laranox does not seem to hold his sons in any kind of regard at all, at least after they are banished from the planet. Him and Lez openly disdain one another, while he will use Norton for his own ends but doesn't care what happens to him in the process.

As a Kingdom Cumian, he also possesses the same superhuman strength and durability as both of his sons, but his may be more powerful than Lez's, as he could be any number of long years older than him.

King Laranox screams every time he wants to speak, and does so with an incredibly thick Scottish accent.

=== Choomahs ===
Voiced by Tom Hollis

The Choomahs are the main antagonists of the show. The Choomahs are a fictional species of wildly ferocious creatures who originated on Choomah Island as a mutation from Clarence's failed experiment. Choomahs often appear in the show in the backgrounds of scenes unbeknownst to other characters but will also sometimes attack characters. Each series of the show culminates in some form of assault on the Choomahs, in an attempt to rid Brown Town and their island of the species. Choomahs are very violent in nature and attack people when provoked.

Choomahs apparently reproduce and evolve extremely quickly, as they have learned to speak English and express remorse for their prior violence at the end of Choomah Island 3, whereupon they fly off to an unknown destination, the leader opining: "You know what? I'm really gonna miss this planet". The extent of their prior association with King Laranox remains unclear, but the recurring Bumble Brutus appeared to answer directly to Laranox.

Appearance-wise, the Choomahs are bright yellow, almost-humanoid creatures, although their shape and size varies dramatically. The design for the Choomahs originated as butchered drawings of Homer Simpson. Choomahs rarely speak, their only form of communication is very loud screeches.

== Themes ==
The main style of comedy used in the show is crude comedy, which the show's creators describe as "Aussie humour". Dialogue between characters is inspired by traits of day-to-day conversations the show's creators observe in real life. Scripts contain extremely frequent and strong profanity, vulgar humour and non-politically correct conversations. In an interview with Vice Media, writer Izak Whear said "There's so much vulgar humour, just all the swearing and stuff. You see it when you go out, it's relatable because you see so much of it." The show's creators have also cited Seinfeld as an influence on their comedy style.

"Everywhere you go there's people making content for you and you're just having fun with it all. Once you step back and observe the culture and humour and the way of life here, it's just so funny! When you step back and have a look you can bring that to life and point it out and have a laugh. The more you point it out the more you keep seeing it everywhere."

— Jarrad Wright, Vice Media

The show is also notable for its psychedelic influences, which are visible throughout many episodes. Aside from most of the main characters being strong drug users, the show sometimes depicts at great length trips the characters experience while under the influence of hallucinogens. In particular, protagonist Lez's trips are shown in episodes where he interacts with other characters in limbo and views his own creation in Microsoft Paint as a surreal out-of-body experience.

In addition to the show's psychedelic themes, the show has several surrealist themes, such as its frequent use of breaking the fourth wall. Especially while on hallucinogenic trips, characters often discuss their nature as cartoon characters and how they are drawn. The show has even gone as far as to have the characters have conversations about how the show's fans are impatient for new episodes to come out.

Although many of the episodes revolve around themes of crude humor and action, themes of companionship and loyalty become more prevalent as the series progress, especially in the final episode.

== Release ==
Season 1 of The Big Lez Show premiered on YouTube on 16 July 2012 under the channel name "guitarfingerz2112" before changing it later on in the series. Season 1 had 10 regular episodes and cumulated with the show's first special, Choomah Island. The special depicts the main characters' first assault on Choomah Island. Most episodes were very short, about 1–2 minutes in length with the season's finale lasting 13 minutes.

Season 2 premiered on 4 March 2013 and was much the same as season 1 regarding production and story. Episodes saw a slight increase in production value, with animations slightly improving in quality and episodes lengthening to around 3–10 minutes. Season 2's finale was a 2-part special lasting 13 minutes in length, entitled Attack of The Choomahs. The special depicts the Choomahs invading Brown Town. Season 2 had 10 episodes in total.

Season 3 saw an improved production, with the show's creators investing in better equipment to animate episodes with. Drawings greatly improved in quality and episodes became more consistent in length, all lasting about 5 minutes. Season 3 premiered on 7 July 2014 and, by this stage, the show's popularity was such that each episode was reaching over one million views within a few months of being uploaded. Season 3 had 9 regular episodes and cumulated with the show's third special, Choomah Island 2, wherein Lez and the gang return for a second assault on Choomah Island. The special lasted just under an hour and took several months to produce. Choomah Island 2 premiered on 21 August 2015 and has been viewed over 10 million times as of November 2026.

Between season 3 and 4, the show's creators took time off to rest and to create the show's spin-off, The Mike Nolan Show. Season 4 of The Big Lez Show premiered on 10 March 2017 and again saw a big step up in production value, with animations again improving greatly in quality and episodes lengthening in duration. Season 4 concluded with the show's final special; Choomah Island 3: Denouement, again taking several months to produce. The special premiered in select theatres in New Zealand and Australia from 20 to 26 January 2019 before premiering on YouTube on 26 January 2019. The special lasted just over an hour, making it the longest episode in the series, and reached 1 million views within 2 weeks of its release. As of November 2026, Choomah Island 3: Denouement has received over 7.5 million views.

== Spin-offs ==
=== The Big Lez Doco ===
In mid-late 2014 a 10-minute short documentary entitled The Big Lez Doco was produced, directed by Jaykowa Hockings and produced by Natalie Howatson. The documentary interviews the show's three creators, where they go in depth about the show's conception, production and inspirations. The documentary also featured never-before-seen animations, depicting some Choomahs playing in a metal band. The documentary was uploaded to YouTube on 20 August 2014 but was taken down in February 2020.

=== The Mike Nolan Show ===
Looking to capitalise on the great success of The Big Lez Show, Comedy Central Australia contacted the show's creators and asked them to create a spin-off of the series. A five episode show entitled The Mike Nolan Show was created by Wright, Whear and Hollis and was broadcast on YouTube and Comedy Central Australia's website, premiering on 10 June 2016. It ended on 13 October 2016 YouTube.

The Mike Nolan Show takes the form of a mockumentary, wherein a film crew and interviewer follow The Big Lez Show character Mike Nolan around his day-to-day life. The show follows Mike in some of his various jobs, as well as showing him socialising with many never-before-seen characters such as Crazy Steve. The show also features appearances from several other main characters of The Big Lez Show, such as Lez, Sassy, Donny and Clarence. The events that take place in The Mike Nolan Show chronologically take place before the first episode of The Big Lez Show.

=== Mike Nolan's Long Weekend ===
In May 2019 a new 5 episode spin-off show entitled Mike Nolan’s Long Weekend was announced. The show takes place 1 year and 6 months after the events of Choomah Island 3: Denouement. The series premiered on Vimeo on 9 August 2019 and then on YouTube on 16 August 2019, the final episode was uploaded to YouTube on 20 August 2019 YouTube. The Mini-Series takes place over 3 days and, just like "The Mike Nolan Show" presents itself in the form of a "mockumentary." The show features characters such as Crazy Steve, Bill the Bartender, Nigel the pub owner as well as characters from The Big Lez Show including Sassy, Donny, Clarence and Quinton.

=== Sassy the Sasquatch ===
On 27 February 2022, Jarrad posted a teaser of a new series on Instagram which shows Sassy walking in a field. On 23 May 2022, a trailer for the new series was uploaded to YouTube. The series was given the title, Sassy The Sasquatch, after the titular character. The series debuted on 27 June 2022 and ended on 3 October 2022. The final episode aired on 2 October 2022. A compilation of all episodes was uploaded 16 November 2022.

=== The Donny and Clarence Show ===
On 28 March 2024, a trailer teaser for a new six part mini series was posted to YouTube, showing Donny and Clarence doing various activities while Clarence sings "It's the Donny and Clarence show". The series debuted on 5 April 2024. The final episode aired on 17 April 2024.

=== Da Fellas ===
On 6 December 2024, a pilot episode for a new series known as Da Fellas was posted to the YouTube channel of the same name. It shows the Choomahs drifting through space, approximately 1 hundred thousand years after the events of Choomah Island 3: Denouement. The Choomahs are then pulled into a wormhole and sent back in time hurdling towards Earth at extreme speeds. The series is created by co-creator of The Big Lez Show Tom Hollis and premiered on 15 August 2025.

=== Collaboration with Xavier Rudd ===
On 26 June 2026, Australian musician Xavier Rudd released the single Part of Life, accompanied by a music video directed and animated by Wright. Drawn in the style of the show, the video features an animated version of Rudd and The Big Lez Show character Sassy.

== Production ==
The show is notable for its low production value. The show is animated using stop motion animation, where individual frames are drawn in Microsoft Paint. Frames are edited together on Adobe Premiere and audio is recorded on Audacity. In seasons 1 and 2, frames were drawn using a laptop trackpad on an Australian government-issue school laptop and since season 3 they have been drawn using a stylus on a Microsoft Surface, increasing the quality of the drawn pictures. The frames are crudely drawn, freehand and have become a recognisable staple of the show. The nature of the show's artwork also adds to the psychedelic influences of the show.

The show employs no outside personnel, the show's creators take onboard all aspects of production, including writing, voice acting, animation, editing, music and distribution. As a result of this, production is a very slow process, with individual episodes sometimes taking several months to create. For seasons 1 and 2 the majority of work was handled by Jarrad Wright. Work was more distributed between Wright, Whear and Hollis for season 3 and The Mike Nolan Show, before Wright returned as the sole producer for season 4.

The show's music is also written and performed by Wright, performed on acoustic guitar and recorded using Audacity.

== Reception ==
The show has gained a following on YouTube, with its channel having over 2.56 million subscribers and 374 million views as of November 2026. The show's popularity on YouTube is such that each episode is released to a viewership of 1-3 million within a couple of months of being uploaded.

In addition the show's viewership on YouTube, The Big Lez Show has enjoyed great critical reception from many alternative media outlets and online reviewers. Vice Media has described the show as "sidesplittingly funny" and "DIY underground Australian cartoons which have taken over the world." Stab Magazine said the show has "More laughs than South Park" in an interview with Wright and Whear and praised the show for the grassroots, word-of-mouth manner in which it has grown in popularity, without any commercial advertising.

In a promotion for The Mike Nolan Show, Comedy Central Australia described Wright, Whear and Hollis as "some of Australia's freshest comedians and comedy-makers." Pedestrian TV described the show as "utterly bewildering but equally brilliant."
