= Neon (service) =

Subscription video on demand service; division of Sky Network Television Limited

- Type: Subsidiary
- Industry: Electronic commerce
- Headquarters: Mt Wellington, Auckland, New Zealand
- Area served: New Zealand
- Products: Internet streaming
- Parent: Sky Network Television Limited
- Website: NEON

Neon, marketed as NEON until 2020, is a New Zealand subscription video on demand over-the-top media service offering a range of television shows and movies. The platform is a division of Sky Network Television Limited.

== History ==
Former Neon logo used from 2015 to 2020.

=== Launch ===
In February 2015, Sky launched its New Zealand Neon streaming service for a range of HBO television shows including Game of Thrones, Crossbones, and True Blood. When Neon was first launched, Sky offered a 30-day free trial period for Neon, with normal subscriptions costing NZ$20 a month. Sky had originally planned to launch Neon in 2014 but was delayed by systems bugs. Neon's February launch was timed to compete with the US-based streaming service Netflix, which launched in New Zealand in March 2015.

In October 2016, a Roy Morgan poll found that 22,000 New Zealanders subscribed to Neon, which was outranked by the rival streaming services Netflix (264,000) and Spark New Zealand's Lightbox (128,000).

When Neon first launched in 2015, it only offered a TV and Movies package worth $20 a month. In August 2018, Neon launched an additional TV-only subscription package worth $12 a month. In September 2019, Neon replaced these two packages with a combined television and movies package for NZ$13.95 a month in order to compete with Netflix, Lightbox, and Amazon Prime Video.

In October 2019, a Horizon Research survey found that 7% of more than 1,000 New Zealanders surveyed used Neon. The survey found that 59% used TVNZ OnDemand, 29% used Sky TV, 28% used ThreeNow, 56% used Netflix, and 18% used Lightbox.

=== Merger with Lightbox ===
Former Neon logo used from 2020 to 2026.

In mid December 2019, Sky announced that it would be purchasing Spark New Zealand's streaming service Lightbox with the intention of merging Neon and Lightbox into one combined streaming service in 2020.

On 11 June, Neon experienced technical difficulties that caused users to be locked out of the app. In mid-June 2020, Sky announced that Lightbox would be merged into Neon, with Lightbox app being replaced by a Neon app on 7 July 2020. The merged service retained the Neon brand but continues to use Lightbox's interface and incorporates content drawn from both Neon and the old Lightbox. Existing Spark customers can receive a NZ$9.95 discount.

On 7 July, Sky formally merged the two streaming services, with the Lightbox app being revamped as Neon. The revamped streaming service allows users to stream on two devices, download films and shows onto devices, rent movies, and create user profiles. Following the merger, there were reports about technical glitches including users being unable to log into the app and the absence of the watchlist feature. Neon responded that it would address those issues.

=== Expansion and partnership agreements ===
On 23 February 2021, Sky reported that its total subscriber base for all of its services and platforms had risen to 990,000 including 154,000 former Lightbox subscribers, who had continued using Neon. Sky confirmed that one third of former "hard-bundled" Lightbox subscribers were using Neon. Sky TV also reported that the number of subscribers to its streaming services including Neon, Sky Sport Now, and RugbyPass had increased from 196,000 in the 2020 half year to 352,000 in the 2021 half year as a result of the COVID-19 pandemic in New Zealand.

In late April 2023, The Spinoff ranked Neon as the top-ranked streaming service in New Zealand, citing its suite of major release titles, solid collection of local content, deep library of HBO content, and its ability to rent new releases.

On 22 October 2024, Sky New Zealand and Warner Bros Discovery confirmed a new partnership that would allow Sky to remain the exclusive distributor of HBO and Max content in New Zealand. Under the partnership, Neon would begin hosting the Max hub from 30 October 2024. On 17 February 2026, Warner Bros Discovery confirmed that it would be launching HBO Max as a standalone service in New Zealand, which was later confirmed to be 16 June. In late April 2026, Sky CEO Sophie Maloney confirmed that the two companies had not renewed their content sharing agreement due to an internal review of content viewership on Neon and Sky TV.

On 27 January 2026, Sky signed a new content partnership agreement with Paramount Skydance that would give Sky and its Neon streaming service exclusive access to content from Showtime, Paramount+ and CBS.

In mid-February 2026, Canstar reported that Neon attracted 15% of the viewership in New Zealand's streaming market during the fourth quarter of 2025, based on measured interest on SVOD from JustWatch. Neon came fourth place behind American streaming platforms Netflix (22%), Amazon Prime Video (21%) and Disney+ (17%). Canstar reported that Neon and local platforms TVNZ+ and ThreeNow were facing strong competition from overseas streaming platforms.

=== Rebranding ===
On 14 May 2026, Sky rebranded Neon's logo and updated the Neon app and website in anticipation of the withdrawal of HBO Max content on 15 June 2026. Sky also updated its entertainment content offering to include a curated mixture of content from several partners including Paramount Skydance, Sony Pictures Television, NBCUniversal, BBC Studios, Lionsgate Studios, A24, The Walt Disney Company, AMC Global Media, Madman Entertainment, Fifth Season, StudioCanal and Bell Media.

== Services and pricing ==
During its initial launch in February 2015, Neon was available on computers, iPhones, iPads and televisions that supported AirPlay. The service was later made available on Android smartphones and tablet computers. As of 2020, Neon is available on a range of devices including newer Samsung Smart TVs, Panasonic Smart TVs, Sony Android TVs, Freeview devices, PlayStation 4, Vodafone TV boxes, Chromecast devices, iOS devices and Apple TV via AirPlay, personal computers and MacBooks equipped with Adobe Flash Player, and selected ioS and Android phones and tablets.

Following the merger of Lightbox into Neon on 7 July 2020, the revamped Neon allows users to stream on two devices. It also has a download feature which allows users to download a maximum of five movies and 25 television shows onto mobiles and tablets. It also allows users to create five profiles and to add favourites to a watchlist. Neon also allows users to rent movies for a fee ranging between NZ$4.99 and NZ$25.00.

In mid April 2021, Sky announced that it would be raising the price of its Neon streaming service to $15.99 a month, citing a growth in subscribers for its streaming services and declining revenue from its Sky Box subscriptions.

In mid July 2022, Neon confirmed that it would be raising the price of its standard streaming service to $17.99 a month and its annual plan to $179.99. In addition, the streaming service announced that it was also introducing a cheaper $12.99 basic subscription service.

On 11 January 2024, Neon introduced advertising and raised prices for its standard plans. Neon raised its Standard Plan from $17.99 to $19.99 per month and its annual plan to $179.99 to $199.99 a year.

== Content ==
Drawing upon Sky's New Zealand-exclusive contract with HBO, Neon previously had exclusive distribution rights for several HBO television shows including Game of Thrones, Big Little Lies, Chernobyl, Westworld, His Dark Materials, Watchmen, and the movie First Man.

Following the merger of Lightbox into Neon, Neon acquired the distribution rights to The Handmaid's Tale, Homeland, Outlander, and Breaking Bad for New Zealand.

In early March 2021, Neon confirmed that it would distribute Zack Snyder's Justice League in New Zealand.

In early October 2021, The New Zealand Herald reported that Neon and Sky's SoHo channel would distribute the Game of Thrones prequel series House of the Dragon.

In early March 2024, Dark City: The Cleaner, an adaptation of New Zealand crime fiction author Paul Cleave's 2006 novel The Cleaner, was released simultaneously on Neon, Sky Go and SoHo.

Following a renewed partnership agreement between Sky and Warner Bros Discovery, Neon began a HBO Max content hub from 30 October 2024. The HBO Max content was removed on 15 June 2026 in anticipation of the platform's launch as a standalone streaming service in New Zealand on 16 June.

Following an exclusive partnership agreement between Sky and Paramount Skydance, Neon gained access to exclusive content from Showtime, Paramount+ and CBS.
