= IRIB Mostanad =

Iranian documentary TV channel

- Country: Iran
- Broadcast area: Asia; Guyana
- Headquarters: Tehran

Programming
- Language: Persian
- Picture format: 16:9 (576i, SDTV) 16:9 (1080p, HDTV)

Ownership
- Owner: Islamic Republic of Iran Broadcasting

History
- Launched: 6 October 2009

Links
- Website: www.doctv.ir

Availability

Terrestrial
- Jamaran: Ch43 UHF Digital
- Thaicom 8 (Thailand): 11186 H 2500 (FTA)

Streaming media
- IRIB Mostanad Live Streaming

IRIB Mostanad (Persian: شبکۀ مستند, Shæbækeh-ye Mostænæd, Documentary channel) is a national documentary TV channel in Iran. It was launched on 6 October 2009 and is the first Iranian digital channel. This channel can be received both using set-top boxes and satellites.

IRIB Mostanad tries to provide interlingual subtitles to make the languages of different ethnic groups understandable to the audience.

== Programs ==
This channel airs documentaries on culture, arts, society, politics, history, nature and the Iran–Iraq War.

== Logos ==
The first logo of this channel was a square with a red globe inside. It paid homage to National Geographic Channel's logo.

6 October 2009 – 17 March 2016

17 March 2016 – present

== See also ==
- Islamic Republic of Iran Broadcasting
- List of documentary channels
