= Sky Drama =

- Country: New Zealand

Programming
- Picture format: 1080i (HDTV) 16:9

Ownership
- Owner: Sky Network Television
- Sister channels: Sky Open; Sky Justice; Sky Suspect; Jones! Sky Movies; Sky Comedy; Sky Kids

History
- Launched: 4 June 2026; 5 months ago

Links
- Website: Official Site

Availability

Streaming media
- Sky Go: skygo.co.nz

Sky Drama is a television channel in New Zealand available on Sky, launched on 4 June 2026.

The channel was created with the closure of HBO. Content consists of a variety of drama series from international production companies, as well as repeats of older (90s-2000s) drama series and a selection of foreign-language titles.

== History ==
=== Background ===
Sky had previously launched a premium content channel, SoHo, on 31 October 2011, where most of its content was drama. With the signing of a new contract agreement with Warner Bros. Discovery (now Skydance), the channel was renamed HBO in late 2024.

=== Launch ===
In May 2026, in anticipation for the launch of HBO Max in New Zealand, Sky announced the creation of Sky Drama to replace it on the abstract. The new channel would launch in early June, but HBO would remain on air until 15 June; after that date, all HBO content would be removed from Sky's services, including Neon and the HBO channel, in favour of the new streaming service. The launch date was later revealed to be 4 June, the same day of Neon's rebrand.
