= Sky Comedy (New Zealand TV channel) =

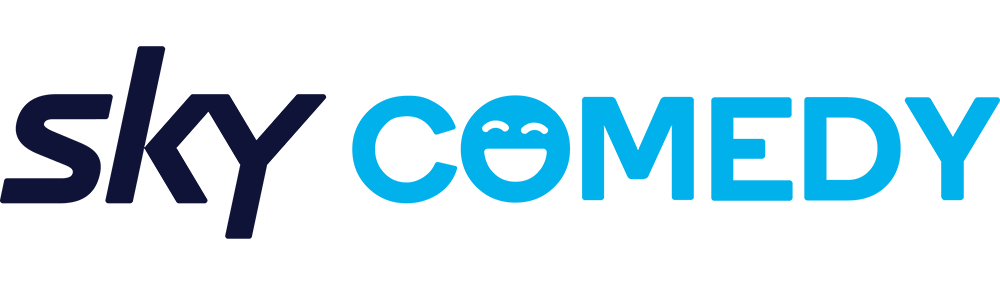
- Country: New Zealand

Programming
- Picture format: 1080i (HDTV) 16:9

Ownership
- Owner: Sky Network Television
- Sister channels: Sky Open; Sky Justice; Sky Suspect; Jones! Sky Movies; Sky Kids; Sky Drama

History
- Launched: 2 December 2025; 11 months ago
- Replaced: Comedy Central

Links
- Website: Official Site

Availability

Streaming media
- Sky Go: skygo.co.nz

Sky Comedy is a television channel in New Zealand available on Sky, launched on 2 December 2025.

The channel's programmes are mostly sourced from US cable network Comedy Central and serves as a replacement to its Australia and New Zealand feed, which was removed per the end of its contract with Paramount. It also inherited its channel slot, channel 11.

== History ==
=== Background ===
Sky launched a New Zealand feed of Comedy Central in 2009, symbolically launching on April Fool's Day. By October 2010, it had lost the local broadcasting licences to The Daily Show and The Colbert Report. Tied to this was the decision to close Viacom's local offices in Auckland and the move of its operations to Sydney. Even after the local feed was made available in Australia, Viacom in 2016 pledged for the increase in New Zealand-specific content, but only for its website.

In July 2025, Sky announced that it would remove Comedy Central, as well as other Paramount channels, later in 2025, when its contract expired.

=== Launch ===
Sky Comedy was announced on 10 November 2025 with a 2 December launch date. To compensate for Comedy Central's closure, Sky announced a volume deal with Paramount to provide the channel with content from its back catalogue, as well as content from other companies.

== Programming ==
Most of the US programming comes from Paramount's back catalogue: Comedy Central shows such as South Park, The Daily Show and Beavis and Butt-Head, as well as archive programming such as Cheers, Reno 911!, Nathan For You and Key and Peele. It will also air the final season of The Late Show with Stephen Colbert. Schitt's Creek and Arrested Development from other companies are also part of the launch schedule. It also plans to air local productions.

Subsequent premieres include Small Town Scandal (shared with NEON).
