= Emerald (2025 TV series) =

British children's television series

- Genre: Children's television series; Fantasy; Action; Adventure
- Based on: Isadora Moon
- Developed by: Harriet Muncaster; Sky Kids
- Written by: Denise Cassar
- Directed by: Bill Gordon
- Composer: Andy Sturmer
- Country of origin: United Kingdom
- Original language: English

Production
- Producer: Deborah Thorpe
- Running time: 11 min
- Production companies: Kelebek Media; APC Studios

Original release
- Network: Sky Kids

Related
- Isadora Moon

Emerald is a British children's television series developed by Harriet Munchester. It is a spin-off of Isadora Moon.

== Premise ==
Emerald's life is changed from being a mermaid living with her dad and his girlfriend above their restaurant to inheriting a princess stepsister and becoming a princess herself when her Mum marries the Sea King. She navigates this new world, living between two homes and being part of a blended family. Theodore the Sea Unicorn and Shelly the Sea Turtle help her with the transition.

== Characters ==
=== Main characters ===
- Emerald (Voiced by Iris Wardill) - a mermaid who works at a restaurant and a princess. She's sometime a musician.
- Delphina (Voiced by Eve Ridley) - she is Emerald's stepsister
- Theodore (Voiced by Rasmus Hardiker) - a sea unicorn
- Shelly - a sea turtle
- Hamish (Voiced by Rasmus Hardiker) - owner of a restaurant
- King Auster - the sea king
- Coral (Voiced by Allison Arnopp) - Emerald's mom who is now a sea queen
- Pearl (Voiced by Faith Omole) - Hamish's girlfriend

=== Supporting characters ===
- Rudy - an angel fish who sometimes grumpy
- Mer Kid - Sky VIP competition winner, guest role (Voiced by Ayla Khan)

== Episodes ==
No. overall	No. in season	Title	Directed by	Written by	Original release date
1	1	"Emerald and the Shimmerlings"	Unknown	Unknown	September 27, 2025
2	2	"Palace Pranksters"	Unknown	Unknown	September 28, 2025
3	3	"Ocean Express Delivery"	Unknown	Unknown	October 4, 2025
4	4	"Sister Sleepover"	Unknown	Unknown	October 5, 2025
5	5	"Lost and Found"	Unknown	Unknown	October 11, 2025
6	6	"Food for Thought"	Unknown	Unknown	October 12, 2025
7	7	"Shelly's Award"	Unknown	Unknown	October 18, 2025
8	8	"Lost Dolphin"	Unknown	Unknown	October 19, 2025
9	9	"Theordore Has a Wobble"	Unknown	Unknown	October 25, 2025
10	10	"We Got This"	Unknown	Unknown	October 26, 2025
11	11	"Mermaids in a Spin"	Unknown	Unknown	November 1, 2025
12	12	"One Good Turn"	Unknown	Unknown	November 2, 2025
13	13	"Dolphin Sitters"	Unknown	Unknown	November 8, 2025
14	14	"Lunchtime Crunchtime"	Unknown	Unknown	November 9, 2025
15	15	"Sea Moss Muffins"	Unknown	Unknown	November 15, 2025
16	16	"Seeing Double"	Unknown	Unknown	November 16, 2025
17	17	"Mystery Seafood Snacker"	Unknown	Unknown	November 22, 2025
18	18	"Whistler Shells"	Unknown	Unknown	November 23, 2025
19	19	"Lights Out"	Unknown	Unknown	November 29, 2025

== Production ==
On July 9, 2024, Sky Kids in the United Kingdom commissioned the show, subsequently announcing that it was set to air in 2025.

On August 28, 2025, it was announced by the sales company Madgic Distribution that the series will be produced by British independent production company Kelebek Media.
