= Isadora Moon (TV series) =

British children's television series

- Genre: Children's television series; Fantasy; Adventure
- Based on: Isadora Moon
- Developed by: Harriet Muncaster; Sky Kids
- Written by: Denise Cassar
- Directed by: Deborah Thorpe (showrunner); William Gordon; Ed Olive
- Country of origin: United Kingdom
- Original language: English

Production
- Running time: 11 Min
- Production companies: Kelebek Media; APC Kids

Original release
- Network: Sky Kids; HBO Max

Related
- Emerald (2025 TV series)

Isadora Moon is a British children's television series developed by Harriet Muncaster.

== Premise ==
Isadora Moon is an animated children's TV series about a young girl who is half-fairy and half-vampire, navigating life's challenges while embracing her unique heritage. It follows her adventures with her best friend, Pink Rabbit, as she learns to balance her different sides and find her place in the world. The show focuses on themes of friendship, self-acceptance, and bravery.

== Characters ==
- Shayla McCormack as Isadora Moon who is part fairy and part vampire.
- Jessica Brown Findlay as Cordelia Moon who is a fairy.
- Oscar a ghost
- Penelope Tumbridge as Zoe

== Episodes ==
Episode 1: The Wobbly Fang

Release Date: November 17, 2023

== Production ==
=== Development ===
Isadora Moon was created by with an initial sketch by author-illustrator Harriet Muncaster of a character who was half-fairy and half-vampire. This initial character concept then evolved into a full book series, which was first published in 2016 and now includes 22 books, selling over 5 million copies worldwide. The series was further developed into a 2D animated series, produced by Kelebek Media, which premiered in 2023. The character concept was developed while Muncaster was an MA student in children's illustration at Anglia Ruskin University, a program that provided strong industry connections.
