= Sky Justice =

- Country: New Zealand

Programming
- Picture format: 1080i (HDTV) 16:9

Ownership
- Owner: Sky Network Television
- Sister channels: Sky Open; Sky Suspect; Jones! Sky Movies; Sky Factual; Sky Drama; Sky Comedy; Sky Kids

History
- Launched: 3 December 1994; 31 years ago
- Former names: Orange (1994–1998); Sky 1 (1998–2008); The Box (2008–2018); Sky 5 (2018–2026)

Links
- Website: Official Site

Availability

Streaming media
- Sky Go: skygo.co.nz

Sky Justice is a subscription television channel in New Zealand available on Sky.

Originally founded as Orange in 1994, it was, for most of its existence and up until 2026, a general entertainment channel. Throughout its history, the channel has had several renames and changes to its formula. Since the rename to Sky Justice however, the channel broadcasts a variety of procedural drama programming.

== History ==
The channel started broadcasting on 3 December 1994 as Orange on Sky UHF pre-set channel 7. Orange broadcast between 10am and around 11:30pm and during 1995 Juice TV began broadcasting overnight when Orange went off the air.

The reason to name the channel based on a colour and its brand identity be a fruit was due to the design agency, Lambie-Nairn, which had also designed the 1991 BBC Two Idents and the 1982 Channel 4 launch idents in the United Kingdom, had found out the New Zealand TV market had an overcrowded space for general entertainment networks, and thus had made the channels branding to be different. Using an orange gave the channel a unique identity in the local television landscape; the name was justified because of its broad programming mix.

Initially it was only available on Sky's UHF service; as of October 1996, it represented 10% of total viewing time on Sky. On 1 November, the channel moved Coronation Street reruns to 11:30am with the addition of a daily movie and miniseries slot at 12pm. The channel lost most of its daytime programming when, due to subscriber demand, Cartoon Network (which started broadcasting on HBO) moved to Orange's frequency from 6am-4pm on 1 January 1997. Orange delivered its programming between 4pm-11:30pm, with Juice TV raking over the overnight portion. In August 1997, it and Sky Sport launched on its satellite service; at the time, the channel was becoming as popular as TV4 and MTV.

Orange changed its name to Sky 1 on 1 June 1998 and introduced overnight programming, with The Simpsons debuting on 7 July 1998 with the first ever episode. Also introduced with the rename was the launch of a late night softcore pornography block, mostly airing titles such as Playboy Late Night, films directed by Alain Siritzky, including a number of Emmanuelle sequels, The Click, Butterscotch, Justine and The Sex Files, later replaced by more softcore titles like David Duchovny's Red Shoe Diaries. This slot ended around 2003. The channel began broadcasting 24 hours a day on 1 January 1999 when the Sky Digital service was launched; however, the UHF channel continued to screen Cartoon Network between 6am-4pm and in 2000 this was replaced with Nickelodeon. The channel started airing WWF/WWE telecasts at the same time, after a ban on free-to-air television in the late 1980s.

In 2005, Sky Network Television considered unencrypting Sky 1 to make it a free-to-air channel, but decided instead to purchase the existing network, Prime.

The logo of The Box from 2008 until 2018

Sky 1 relaunched on 1 February 2008 and in the process its name was changed to The Box. The rebrand was marked by premieres of new series and reality shows, as well as new seasons of existing titles. The new version of the channel removed all sports telecasts, which moved to Sky Sport.

The logo of Sky 5 from 2018 until 2026

On 2 February 2018, exactly 10 years and one day after the channel relaunched as The Box, it rebranded for the third time in its history, as Sky 5. The existing mix of programmes continued, but key changes included the addition of TV series based on DC Comics properties and US action shows.

The channel was renamed Sky Justice on 22 October 2026 and shifted its focus to crime-related programming. All non-crime programming left the station on the same day.

== Programming ==
=== Current ===
This is a list of Sky 5's programming as of December 2024, which is a mix of American, British, and Australian TV imports with a small amount of New Zealand shows.

- Channel Patrol
- The Enemy Within
- FBI: Most Wanted
- Ghosts of Beirut
- Go On
- The Last Kingdom
- Lockerbie
- The Mentalist
- The Middle
- Parks and Recreation
- Quantum Leap
- South Beach Tow
- Territory Cops
- Traffic Cops

=== Previous ===
- The Simpsons
- South Park
- WWE NXT (Live until December 2024)
- WWE Raw (Live until December 2024)
- WWE SmackDown (Live until December 2024)
- Xena: Warrior Princess
