= Sky Network Television =

Pay television company in New Zealand

Sky Network Television Limited
- Type: Public
- Traded as: NZX: SKT; ASX: SKT; S&P/NZX 50 component
- Industry: Entertainment; Mass Media; Pay television Telecommunications
- Founded: 1987; 39 years ago
- Founders: Craig Heatley; Terry Jarvis; Trevor Farmer; Alan Gibbs
- Headquarters: Auckland, New Zealand
- Key people: Sophie Moloney (CEO); Philip Bowman (Chairman)
- Products: Neon; Sky Broadband; Sky Go; Sky Sport Now; Sky TV; ThreeNow
- Services: Subscription television Satellite television Television production Broadcasting; Media streaming Broadband internet
- Revenue: ▼NZ$750.7 million (2025)
- Operating income: ▼NZ$31.5 million (2025)
- Net income: ▼NZ$20.6 million (2025)
- Total assets: ▼NZ$672.9 million (2025)
- Total equity: ▼NZ$439 million (2025)
- Number of employees: 1,200+
- Subsidiaries: Sky Free
- Website: sky.co.nz

Sky Network Television Limited, more commonly known as Sky, is a New Zealand broadcasting company that provides pay television services via satellite, media streaming services, and broadband internet services. As of 30 June 2025, Sky had 914,368 residential television subscribers consisting of 448,290 satellite subscribers and 409,582 streaming subscribers. Additionally, Sky had 50,867 broadband customers. It also provides free-to-air services through its subsidiary Sky Free, which it acquired from Warner Bros. Discovery on 1 August 2025. Despite the similarity of name, branding and services, such as Sky Go and MySky shared with its Comcast-owned, European equivalent, Sky Group, there is no connection between the companies.

== History ==
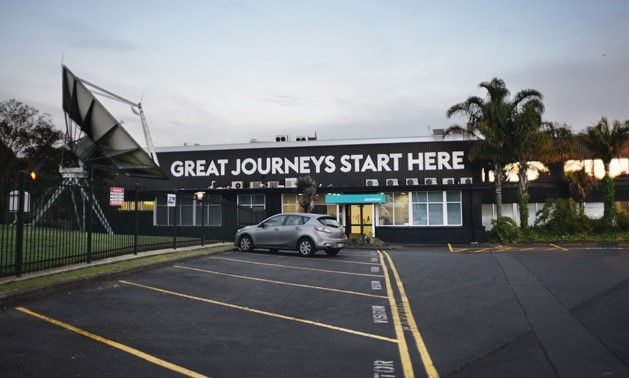
Sky headquarters in Mount Wellington, Auckland

The company was founded by Craig Heatley, Terry Jarvis, Trevor Farmer and Alan Gibbs in May 1987 as Sky Media Limited. It was later incorporated on 26 November, five weeks after the stock market crash. It was formed to investigate beaming sports programming into nightclubs and pubs using high performance 4-metre (13') satellite dishes by Jarvis and an engineering associate Brian Green, but was redirected into pay television following successful bidding in early 1990 for four groups of UHF frequencies in the Auckland, Hamilton and Tauranga regions. The company announced plans for a three-network service in February 1989, and would not launch until after TV3's launch later in the year. These were:

- Sky News, with in-depth news from around the world and local news taken from TVNZ
- Sky Sport, from 12pm to 12am, drawing in from ESPN and Bond Media's resources
- Sky Light, also from 12pm to 12am, a variety channel with movies, miniseries, music and children's programmes

Initially operating only in the Auckland region, Sky contracted Broadcast Communications (now Kordia) to provide the broadcast service and transmission from its Panorama Road studios, formerly owned by defunct broadcaster Northern Television.

The initial corporate structure consisted of the following shareholders:

- Craig Heatley (35%)
- Terry Jarvis (35%)
- ESPN (5%)
- TVNZ (5%)

In May 1989, TVNZ and Sky jointly went to MIPTV in Cannes for the first time to obtain over 100 feature films. Rod Dixon joined the company at the end of the month as Sports and Special Events Manager. In June, both companies acquired the rights to the 1992 Summer Olympics for NZ$8 million. Harold Anderson, formerly of TVNZ, was appointed director of programming; he had assisted with the setup of Sky before briefly moving to the UK as the BBC's head of acquisitions.

The first Sky subscriber was former Speaker of the House of Representatives Jonathan Hunt, according to Helen Clark, former Prime Minister of New Zealand.

The concept of a pay television service was new to New Zealand and Sky had early problems. These included viewer acceptance of subscriber television. It faced difficulty in educating retailers and customers on the use of the original decoders. However, this problem was eased with the introduction of easier-to-use decoders that allowed greater viewer flexibility.

On 10 December 1997, the company was listed on NZX.

=== UHF service ===
The first test transmissions took place in Auckland at 8:30am on 23 March 1990 when test patterns were activated on the frequencies used for the service, followed on 6 April by test broadcasts of the Sky Sport channel with rugby from Sydney; Sky originally launched on 18 May 1990 as an analogue UHF service. Subscribers required a VideoCrypt decoder and a UHF aerial, both of which were supplied upon joining Sky. The signal was sent with the picture scrambled using VideoCrypt technology; the decoder was used to unscramble the picture. Sky Movies was the only channel broadcast in NICAM stereo; Sky Sport and Sky News were broadcast in mono. The original decoder didn't actually support stereo sound; if a subscriber wanted to watch Sky Movies in stereo, the subscriber had to feed the audio from another source such as a NICAM stereo capable VCR.

Free-to-air broadcasts were shown in the early morning hours on Sky News and between 5 pm and 6 pm on Sky Sport until mid-1991 which meant those without a Sky subscription could view the broadcasts without a UHF decoder by tuning their TV to the Sky News or Sky Sport UHF channel, as the signals were not scrambled during those times.

The original channel lineup consisted of three channels, Sky Movies (later renamed to HBO before reverting to its original name), Sky Sport and Sky News. Sky rapidly won long term rights from US sports network ESPN (which became a 1% shareholder) as well as CNN and HBO providing it with a supply of sports, news and movies for the three channels. Sky News screened a mixture of CNN International and BBC news bulletins and a replay of the 6 pm One Network News bulletin from TVNZ, later changing to a replay of the 3 News 6 pm bulletin from TV3. The Sky News channel was later discontinued and became branded as a CNN channel.

In 1993, Sky announced that it would expand its coverage as a result of its growing number of subscribers.

In 1994, Sky launched two further channels – Discovery Channel and Orange; Orange later became known as Sky 1 and then The Box. Discovery Channel broadcast on a channel already used by Trackside. The Trackside service was available free to air to anyone who could receive the UHF signal without the need for a Sky decoder, Discovery Channel screened outside of racing hours and was only available to Sky subscribers.

Orange broadcast from 10 am onwards each day with Juice TV screening outside of Orange's broadcast hours, Juice TV was available originally free to air. Cartoon Network shared the same channel as Orange from 1997 to 2000 screening between 6 am and 4 pm with Orange screening after 4 pm. In 2000, Cartoon Network was replaced with Nickelodeon. Juice ended its UHF carriage in 2002, after a three-year period where it was encrypted on the service.

Later, funding allowed Sky to extend its coverage throughout most of New Zealand: In 1991, the company expanded to Rotorua, Wellington and Christchurch. Then in 1994, the company expanded to Hawke's Bay, Manawatu, Southland and Otago, followed by the Wairarapa, Taupō, and Wanganui regions in 1995. Its final UHF expansion, in 1996, was to Taranaki, Whangārei, and eastern Bay of Plenty Region.

An agreement with The Warehouse saw the retailer selling UHF subscriptions in 67 of its 78 outlets from October 2002. These were all located within Sky's UHF service zones.

Following the launch of the digital satellite service in 1998 (see below), Sky began reducing services on the UHF platform. NICAM stereo was eventually removed from Sky Movies in 2001 after moving its transmitter network from Telecom NZ to BCL (currently Kordia) while the CNN channel was discontinued in 2004 with the UHF frequencies issued to Māori Television. It was also relatively easy to hack, when, in 2002, descriptions of a computer program descrambling the signals was mentioned on Jeremy Bertenshaw's website circulated beyond his friend circle.

Sky announced in July 2009 that it would no longer accept new UHF subscriptions and that the equipment to replace the UHF transmitters had become impossible to find due to lack of production, as some of its transmitters began to collapse. There were reportedly 25,000 subscribers to the UHF service in 2009, a far cry from the 300,000 of 1995.

Sky switched off its analogue UHF TV service on 11 March 2010 at midnight.

Sky used a portion of the freed up UHF and radio spectrum to launch its joint venture, Igloo, in December 2012. The remaining unused spectrum was relinquished back to the Government and will be recycled to support new broadcasting ventures.

=== Satellite service ===
Sky logo used from 1990 until 2019

Plans for a satellite service emerged in November 1996, set to launch in April or May 1997. The five channels already on UHF (Orange, Sky Movies, Sky Sport, Discovery Channel, CNN) were being joined by five more: ESPN 2, a new version of Orange carrying British programmes and dramas, Hallmark Channel, and two further channels which were still being considered.

In April 1997, Sky introduced a nationwide analogue direct broadcasting via satellite (DBS) service over the Optus B1 satellite. This allowed it to offer more channels and interactive options, as well as nationwide coverage. It upgraded it to a digital service on 1 October 1998, initially offering only ten channels, hoping to increase to 20 by the end of the year. In its first week, 30,000 subscribers joined, which the company did not expect too soon. Sky could not keep up with the demand and took the decision of suspending new subscriptions in November, aiming to resume it by mid-January 1999.

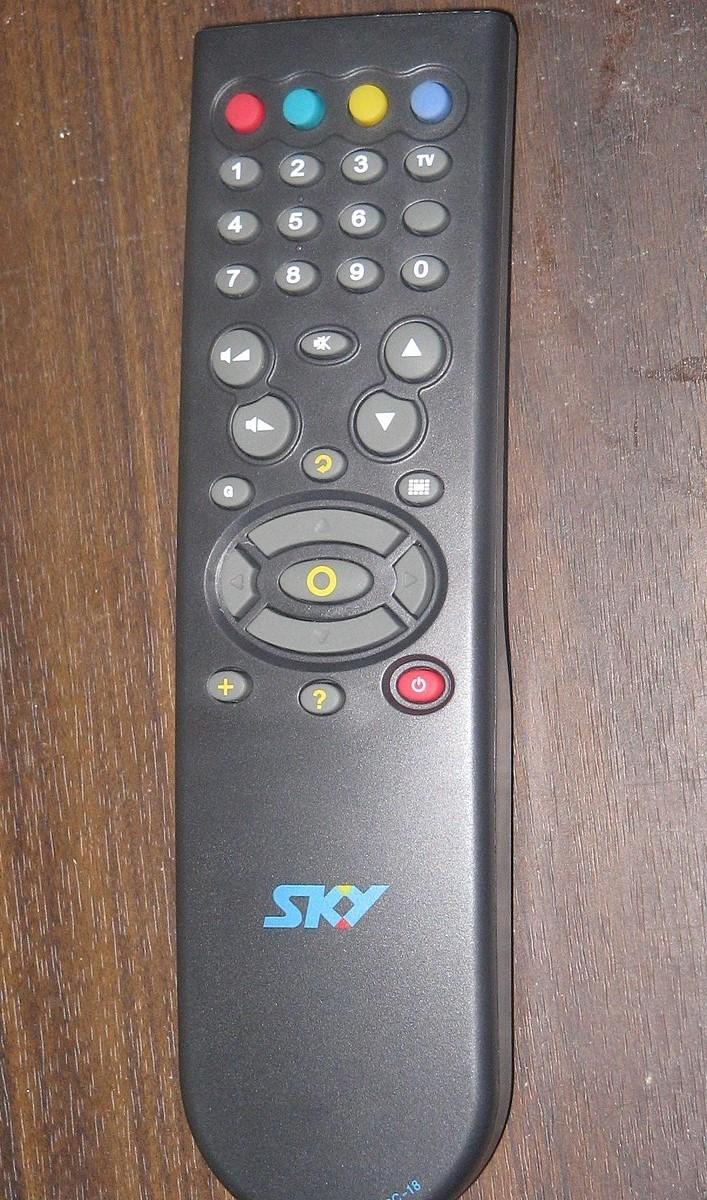
Pace remote control used for original Sky digital service

While some channels on the UHF platform were shared with other channels, Sky Digital screened the same channels 24 hours a day. Orange (later known as Sky 1 and The Box) extended to screening 24 hours a day on Sky Digital but was only available to Sky UHF subscribers between 4 pm and 6 am. Discovery Channel was available to Sky Digital subscribers 24 hours a day but UHF subscribers could only receive the channel outside of Trackside's broadcast hours.

Digital versions of free-to-air channels have always been available on Sky Digital meaning that some subscribers did not need to purchase any equipment to receive digital TV when New Zealand switched off its analogue service. While most free-to-air channels have been available on Sky Digital, TVNZ channels TVNZ 1 and TVNZ 2 did not become available until the end of 2001, when the two parties entered an agreement to carry the channels in November of that year. This caused the channel line-up to be rearranged; in addition, BBC World was added, in a non-exclusive deal, which did not affect overnight carriage of the channel on TV One.

A SkyMail email service was featured for a time starting November 2002, but was later pulled due to lack of interest (including the wireless keyboards they had produced for it).

The unreliability of the ageing Optus B1 satellite was highlighted when the DBS service went offline just before 7 p.m. NZST (8 a.m. London, 3 a.m. New York) on 30 March 2006. The interruption affected service to over 550,000 customers and caused many decoders to advise customers of "rain fade." Due to excessive volume of calls to the Sky toll-free help-desk, Sky posted update messages on their website advising customers that they were working with Optus to restore service by midnight. Sky credited customers with one day's subscription fees as compensation for the downtime at a cost to the company of NZ$1.5 million. Sky switched its DBS service to the Optus D1 satellite, announced in July, on 15 November 2006. The satellite enabled the addition of fifteen new channels, including new services for young audiences. It later expanded its transponder capacity on this satellite to allow for extra channels and HD broadcasts.

=== My Sky launch ===
On 5 December 2005, Sky released its own digital video recorder (DVR), which was an upgraded set top box similar to Foxtel IQ in Australia or TiVo in the United States, called My Sky. The PVR's hard disc had a storage of 160 GB (60 hours). About 10,000 units were sent in its first year, which was half of what was planned due to logistical issues.

Early boxes had flaws in the EPG, which did not work in real time, causing disruption to recordings, while the default channel when switched on was Sky's preview channel, instead of the last channel the viewer watched.

This generation of boxes was replaced by My Sky HDi when it launched on 1 July 2008. These boxes allow connection of up to four satellites which can work with its four TV tuner cards in any combination. The device has a 320GB HDD. The quality of My Sky HDi is 576i via component and 720/1080i via HDMI.

On 1 July 2011, a version of the same decoder with a 1TB hard drive was launched as My Sky+. Much like what happened with the previous My Sky model, the launch was plagued by similar problems, with some subscribers not receiving their units until after 9 September 2011, ten days after the start of the 2011 Rugby World Cup.

=== Purchase of Prime Television ===
In November 2005, Sky announced it had purchased the free-to-air channel Prime TV for NZ$30 million. Sky uses Prime TV to promote its pay content and to show delayed sports coverage. New Zealand's Commerce Commission issued clearance for the purchase on 8 February 2006. Prime was renamed Sky Open in 2023.

=== Purchase of Onsite Broadcasting ===
In July 2010, Sky purchased Onsite Broadcasting, later Outside Broadcasting (OSB), from Australia's Prime Media Group. The sale price was $35 million but once liabilities were taken into account the net amount was $13.5 million. Since 2001, OSB provided outside broadcast facilities for Sky's sporting coverage and was also contracted out by Sky to other broadcasters like TVNZ, TV3, Warner Bros., Fox Sports, Channel 9, Ten Network, Channel 7 and BBC among others. It effectively replaced Moving Pictures, which was TVNZ's outside broadcast division, that had dominated the market. Moving Picture's assets were eventually sold when Sky's sports rights increased in the mid-2000s and OSB took hold.

OSB owned the following vehicles (until 2020's sale), based in Auckland, Wellington and Christchurch;

- HD1 and HD3: 14.3m semi-trailer production unit with expanding side, capable of holding 20+ cameras. They are supporter by tender vehicles. HD1 is based in Christchurch.
- HD2: 14.3m semi-trailer production unit with the capability of holding up to 16+ cameras. It is supported by a tender vehicle with extra production facilities. This unit is based in Wellington.
- HD4: 15m semi-trailer production unit with the capability of using 16+ cameras. It too is supported by a tender vehicle with additional production space.
- HD5: 12.5m rigid truck and can input 8+ cameras supported by a similar sized tender vehicle with additional production room.
- HD6: Small van which is capable of 6+ cameras. It is supported by a similar sized van for storage and linking
- AUX1: Was an original outside broadcast production unit (OSB1), however it has been converted into a specialised production trailer (not a stand-alone OB trailer) for specialty cameras, additional graphics and houses any overflow production areas for larger broadcasts
- OSB2: An original standard definition 13.5m semi-trailer production unit capable of 14+ cameras. This is supported by a tender truck with additional production space.
- HD/SD Fly Away kits: Suitable for broadcasts overseas

On 12 August 2020, Sky announced it had sold Outside Broadcasting to NEP New Zealand, part of American production company NEP Group. As part of the transaction, NEP will be Sky's outsourced technical production partner in New Zealand until at least 2030. The sale was cleared by the Commerce Commission on 5 February 2021.

=== News Corp sale ===
Sky logo used from 2013 to 2019

In February 2013, News Corp announced it would be selling the 44 percent stake in Sky TV that it acquired via a merger with Independent Newspapers Ltd in 2005.

=== Replacement of legacy hardware ===
From November 2015, Sky started replacing the legacy standard digital decoders and original 2005 My Sky decoders with a new digital decoder, manufactured by Kaon.

The Kaon Sky box includes built-in Wi-Fi. The Kaon box has an ability to block recording features and storage capacity. The decoder upgrade allowed Sky to cease broadcasting scrambled channels using H.262 video compression in favour of H.264. The software upgrade to My Sky boxes contained many bugs and caused thousands of customers to become disgruntled. The major issue was with the screen font which Sky later addressed in a future upgrade.

=== Proposed merger with Vodafone New Zealand ===
In June 2016, Sky TV and Vodafone New Zealand (now One NZ) agreed to merge, with Sky TV purchasing 100% of Vodafone NZ operations for a cash payment of $1.25 billion NZD and issuing new shares to the Vodafone Group. Vodafone UK will get 51% stake of the company. However, the proposed merger was rejected by the Commerce Commission which saw a plunge in Sky TV's shares. Sky continued to be a wholesale channel provider to Vodafone until 31 March 2023.

=== Unbundling, IVP project and departure of CEO ===
In late February 2018, Sky TV announced that it would be splitting its existing Sky Basic service into two new packages called Sky Starter and Sky Entertainment, giving new and existing customers the option of building bundles. The Sky Starter package would cost $24.91 monthly, replacing the earlier Sky Basic service which cost $49.91 monthly with extra charges for sports, movie, and other premier channels. The price reduction came in response to fierce competition from streaming services such as Netflix, Lightbox, and Amazon Prime Video, which had caused the loss of 38,000 satellite subscribers the previous year. Unlike its competitors, Sky TV was dependent on a linear broadcasting model and its exclusive rights to rugby union, rugby league, netball, and cricket content. While Sky TV hoped that this change would attract new customers, the company's stock market shares dropped by 10% in response to investor concerns about future revenue, knocking NZ$100 million off its market value.

In early March 2018, it was reported that Sky TV CEO John Fellet was pursuing talks with Netflix and Amazon Prime to share content and services. Fellet hoped to mimic the UK-based television company Sky plc's success in negotiating a bundling package with Netflix.

On 26 March 2018, John Fellet announced his intention to step down from his position, after being CEO for 17 years. Fellet had been with the company since 1991, first as chief operating officer before taking on the chief executive role in January 2001. On 21 February 2019, Martin Stewart replaced John Fellet as CEO. He had previously worked for BSkyB, The Football Association and OSN. On 1 December 2020, Stewart left the company to return home to Europe. Sophie Maloney was immediately appointed to the CEO position.

=== Focus on streaming ===
In February 2015, Sky launched its own subscription-based video streaming service called Neon. Sky had initially planned to launch Neon in 2014 but was delayed by systems bugs.

On 16 August 2019, Sky announced it had purchased Coliseum Sports Media's global rugby streaming service RugbyPass for approximately US$40 million.

The Disney channels (Disney Channel and Disney Junior) were removed on 30 November 2019, causing anger from subscribers. Sky Movies Disney was replaced by Sky Movies Family from 1 November 2019. The company still had some Disney titles stocked "well into 2020".

On 19 December 2019, it was announced that Sky would be purchasing Spark New Zealand's streaming service Lightbox. On 14 June 2020, Sky confirmed that Lightbox would be merged into the Neon app on 7 July 2020. The merged service retains the Neon brand but uses Lightbox's interface and includes content drawn from both Neon and the old Lightbox.

=== Launch of broadband service ===
On 21 May 2020, Sky announced its plans to launch fibre broadband internet plans in 2021. Sky raised $157 million from investors with a discounted share issue to cover the cost of entering the broadband market.

On 24 March 2021, Sky launched the broadband service initially for existing satellite customers only. Sky later expanded the offering to new customers on 17 May 2021.

=== Pursuing partnerships ===
On 22 August 2019, it was announced that Sky had signed a six-year agreement to take over from Westpac as the naming sponsor of Wellington Regional Stadium, effective 1 January 2020.

On 28 November 2019, Sky announced that TVNZ would be its free-to-air broadcast partner for the 2020 Summer Olympics, instead of its own free-to-air channel Prime.

On 27 October 2020, Sky announced a partnership with Spark, where the Sky Sport Now streaming service would be bundled with Spark Sport for an NZ$49.99 monthly subscription.

On 9 June 2021, Sky announced an exclusive partnership with Disney to provide Sky Broadband customers with a 12-month subscription to the Disney+ streaming service.

On 24 June 2021, Sky announced a partnership with Discovery New Zealand to provide coverage of The Championships, Wimbledon for free-to-air channel Three.

In response to the 2022 Russian invasion of Ukraine, Sky removed Russian state TV channel RT from its programming. Sky spokesperson Chris Major stated that their decision to remove RT came following complaints from customers and consultation with the Broadcasting Standards Authority.

In July 2023, Warner Bros. Discovery renewed its HBO Max programme supply agreement with Sky but decline to confirm whether it would launch its own streaming service in New Zealand. On 22 October 2024, Sky and Warner Bros. Discovery confirmed a new partnership that would allow Sky to remain the exclusive distributor of HBO and Max content in New Zealand. SoHo would also be revamped as a linear HBO channel showing HBO Original content. The Max hub and the revamped HBO channel would be hosted on Sky Box, Sky Pod and Sky Go. The Neon streaming service would also host the Max hub. On February 17, 2026, Warner Bros Discovery confirmed that it would be launching HBO Max as a standalone service in New Zealand from mid-2026, later confirmed to be 16 June 2026. Sky CEO Sophie Maloney confirmed that the two companies had not renewed their content sharing agreement following an internal review of content viewership on Sky TV and Neon. Prior to the launch of HBO Max in New Zealand in mid-June 2026, the HBO channel was closed while the HBO Max streaming hubs on Sky Go and Neon were removed.

On 19 January 2025, The New Zealand Herald reported that, with the takeover of former sister platform Foxtel by DAZN, analysts in New Zealand were predicting a similar move for Sky, under the grounds that the provider was undervalued.

On 27 January 2026, Sky signed a new content partnership agreement with Paramount Skydance that would give Sky and its Neon streaming service exclusive access to content from Showtime, Paramount+ and CBS.

=== Satellite relocation ===
In November 2024, Sky satellite customers began to notice a decline in the quality of their video, due to the end of support for Optus D2 due May 2025. This issue worsened over time, and in January 2025, Sky officially announced its intention to switch from Optus D2 to Koreasat 6. Initially, Sky had planned to make a change to another Optus satellite in 2027–29, but Optus's satellite would not be operational by then. Customers were advised to tune in to channels 888 and 777 for satellite testing purposes.

Sky started Koreasat 6 services on the morning of 14 April 2025, putting an end to months of signal loss.

=== Acquisition of Discovery NZ ===
On 22 July 2025, Warner Bros. Discovery confirmed it would sell its New Zealand assets including the Three TV channel and ThreeNow streaming service to Sky TV, effective 1 August. On 28 July, Sky TV confirmed that Discovery NZ would be renamed Sky Free following the acquisition due to legal reasons. Sky also filed trademark applications for the names and logos for Sky Free and SkyFree with the Intellectual Property Office of New Zealand. Sky also confirmed that it would retain the Three TV and ThreeNow brands.

According to Stop Press, the acquisition of Three is expected to give Sky a combined audience reach of 2.2 million linear viewers and 1.2 million digital viewers per week. In addition, Sky and Three will share NZ Rugby's broadcast rights for the next five years. On 13 August, Sky's chief media and data officer Lauren Quaintance, who played a role in Sky's acquisition of Three and boosting the company's advertising revenue, announced he would resign. Warner Bros. New Zealand and Australia's former head of networks, Juliet Peterson, also joined Sky's executive team with responsibility for managing the company's advertising revenue and business-to-business activities including the Sky Free channels.

In February 2026, Sky TV confirmed it would cut more than a dozen sales roles as part of its acquisition of Three, citing a "softer" advertising market, rising costs for its Sky Sport Now streaming service, and the expected loss of HBO Max content in mid-2026.

=== New in-house channels ===
In July 2025, Sky announced the removal of the Paramount networks when its contract expired. In November 2025, it was announced that Sky would replace Cartoon Network and the Paramount networks with new in-house channels. Cartoon Network content will move to Sky Go, while Nickelodeon will be replaced by Sky Kids and Comedy Central by Sky Comedy. To replace MTV and MTV 80s, it announced the return of Juice TV and J2. These channels were operational from 2 December 2025. Sky justified the decision on the dissatisfaction its subscribers have with constant repeats on its affiliate channels. In 2026, it launched Sky Drama on 4 June, displacing HBO, then Sky Factual on 25 August and the renaming of Sky 5 to Sky Justice as well as Vibe to Sky Suspect on 22 October.

== Products and services ==
=== Television channels ===
Sky's current in-house channels:

==== Subscription channels ====
- Sky 5 is a general entertainment channel, first launched on 3 December 1994 as Orange. The channel would rebrand as Sky 1 in 1998 and introduce The Simpsons. After that just a decade later in 2008 the channel would rebrand as The Box and would finally rebrand to Sky 5 just another decade later.
- Sky Comedy is a channel broadcasting comedy programming. It launched in 2025, replacing Comedy Central.
- Sky Drama is a channel broadcasting drama programming. It launched in 2026, replacing HBO.
- Sky Factual is a channel launched in 2026. Its programming consists of both documentary and reality content.
- Sky Kids is a channel launched in 2025 that programming includes licensed titles from Nickelodeon and some original, local content.
- Sky Movies is a group of six movie channels. The first Sky Movies channel was introduced in 1990 on the Sky UHF service.
- Sky Sport is a group of ten sports-oriented channels, with additional pop-up channels to broadcast some events.
- Vibe is a female-oriented channel for 25–54 year-olds. The channel was launched in 2007.

==== Free-to-air channels ====
- Bravo is a female-oriented free-to-air channel featuring reality television. It was launched in 2016. Before this, the channel was Four (established in 1997). Brand under license from NBCUniversal.
- Eden is a channel that features lifestyle and drama programming. It was launched in 2012 as Choice TV.
- HGTV is a channel broadcasting American home and garden programming. Brand under license from Skydance.
- Rush is a male-oriented channel featuring factual programming. It was launched in 2022.
- Sky Open is a general entertainment free-to-air channel. It was first launched in 1998 as Prime and was owned by Prime Television Ltd. Prime Television Ltd would then go into a partnership with Nine Network Australia in 2002, and in March 2002, Prime was relaunched to air Nine Network's Australian-made programmes. causing the graphics of the channel to look like Nine Network's broadcast presentation. The channel was bought by Sky Network Television in 2006. The channel was rebranded to its current name in 2023.
- Three is a general entertainment free-to-air channel. It was launched in 1989 and purchased by Sky in 2025.

=== Sky Lineup ===
Sky defines a virtual channel order that groups channels by their content.

Prior to 30 November 2019, Sky also provided the Disney and Disney Junior channels but discontinued these channels following the launch of the Disney+ streaming service in New Zealand on 19 November. In addition, Sky replaced the Sky Movies Disney channel with Sky Movies Family. Sky still continued to broadcast Disney's National Geographic channel until 31 March 2023.

=== Streaming services ===
==== Sky Go ====
Sky Go's logo

Sky Go is Sky's video on demand and live streaming service, which was launched in 2011 as iSky.

==== Remote record ====
In August 2009 an online service was launched where customers can log on and set their My Sky boxes to record programmes.

==== Sky TV Guide app ====
Sky has released a mobile app which works on iOS devices such as iPhone, iPad and iPod Touches, Android devices & Windows 8.

==== Sky Sport Now ====
On 27 October 2020, Sky announced that it would be bundling its Sky Sport Now streaming service with Spark Sport.

==== Neon ====
In February 2015, Sky launched Neon (branded as NEON), a subscription video on demand service. Prior to September 2019, Neon offered two packages: the TV package or the TV & Movies package. In September 2019, Neon shifted to a single TV & Movies package.

In mid December 2019, it was announced that Sky would be purchasing rival streaming service Lightbox. For that period, Spark will continue to provide services to Lightbox customers. On 7 July 2020, Sky formally merged the Lightbox app into Neon.

=== Discontinued products and services ===
==== Igloo ====
On 24 November 2011 Sky announced they had formed a partnership with Television New Zealand to launch a new low-cost pay television service during the first half of 2012. This was called Igloo and Sky had a 51% share in the venture. Details were announced on 8 December via a press release. Sky offered a selection of channels on a pre-pay basis.

The Igloo service was closed on 1 March 2017, and Igloo boxes can still be used to access free-to-air channels by updating the system software of the box.

==== Fatso ====
Sky also owned an Online DVD and video game rental service called Fatso. It discontinued business in December 2017.

==== Magazine publishing ====
Sky provided a Skywatch monthly magazine to all its customers, published by Stuff and printed by Ovato. Skywatch once had a readership of 965,000 which made it the largest magazine read in New Zealand, and the largest monthly magazine. The magazine provided monthly listings for Sky channels, as well as highlights and features. The publication moved to digital only in April 2020 and was discontinued in August 2020.

== Technical ==
Sky switched from the ageing Optus B1 to the Optus D1 satellite for its DBS service on 15 November 2006. Initially, Sky used vertically polarised transponders on Optus D1 (as it had on Optus B1). However, on 31 July 2007 it moved its programming to horizontally polarised transponders with New Zealand-specific beams to be consistent with Freeview and to gain access to more transmission capacity. Sky have also purchased some of the capacity of Optus D3, which was launched mid August 2009, this gives Sky the ability to add more channels and upgrade existing channels to HD in the future. However, due to the LNB switching that would be required the single D3 transponder lease was later dropped in 2011.

== Reputation ==
The 2016 NZ Corporate Reputation Index placed Sky in last place. The Corporate Reputation Index lists the top 25 companies in New Zealand based on revenue sourced from the 2015 Deloitte Top 200 list, and is judged by consumers with no company input. In the 2016 list Sky had dropped two places to number 25 from 2015.

In the 2020 Brand Reputation Index, Sky came in at Number 9 in the Top 10 Brands Delivering Brand Purpose.

=== Sky Satellite Issues ===
In late 2024, Sky NZ satellite customers began experiencing a decline in video quality due to issues with the Optus D2 satellite, which was nearing the end of its operational life. In August 2024, Sky announced plans to transition to a new satellite earlier than initially scheduled, following delays with the Optus 11 satellite's deployment. The accelerated migration aimed to ensure uninterrupted service for customers.

In mid-March 2025, Sky began deploying a critical update to Pace and Kaon Sky boxes to ensure a seamless transition to the new satellite.

Sky acknowledged that approximately 5% of its customers, equating to around 20,000–25,000 individuals, were affected by these signal issues.

== See also ==
- Optus satellite failures
