= Sky Suspect =

New Zealand TV channel

- Country: New Zealand

Programming
- Picture format: 1080i (HDTV) 16:9

Ownership
- Owner: Sky Network Television
- Sister channels: Sky Comedy; Sky Drama; Sky Factual; Sky Justice; Sky Kids

History
- Launched: 1 October 2007; 19 years ago
- Former names: Vibe (2007-2026)

Links
- Website: http://www.skytv.co.nz/vibe/

Availability

Streaming media
- Sky Go: skygo.co.nz

Sky Suspect is an entertainment channel available to customers of New Zealand satellite television provider Sky. The channel broadcasts detective and mystery drama programmes.

== History ==
Originally launched as Vibe, a basic tier channel, it was moved up a pay tier to the Entertainment Package in February 2018. Programming originally included drama, factual and reality entertainment from the United States, UK, Canada, Australia and New Zealand. The channel has played New Zealand On Air funded titles including The Brokenwood Mysteries, which premiered on Sky-owned free-to-air channel Prime .

Vibe logo used from 2012-2026

The channel's launch schedule featured programmes never before seen in New Zealand including Make Me A Supermodel with Rachel Hunter, Most Haunted, Tori & Dean: Inn Love, Katie & Peter, Desire, and Victoria Beckham: Coming to America.

The channel was renamed Sky Suspect on 22 October 2026.

== Programmes ==
As of October 2026, the programming on Sky Suspect consists of:

- Harry Wild
- Miss Fisher's Murder Mysteries
