= Sky Movies (New Zealand TV channel) =

- Logo used since 2019
- Country: New Zealand

Programming
- Picture format: 1080i (HDTV) 16:9

Ownership
- Owner: Sky Network Television

History
- Launched: 18 May 1990; 36 years ago

Links
- Website: Official Site

Sky Movies is a group of subscription television movie channels in New Zealand operated by Sky. Sky Movies was started in 1990 as one of the original channels on the Sky UHF Service. Sky Movies has progressed from the original channel (now known as Sky Movies Premiere) in 1990 to six separate movie channels screening special interest movies, today. All Sky Movies channels are broadcast in high definition.

== History ==
Sky Movies logo used from 2007–2013

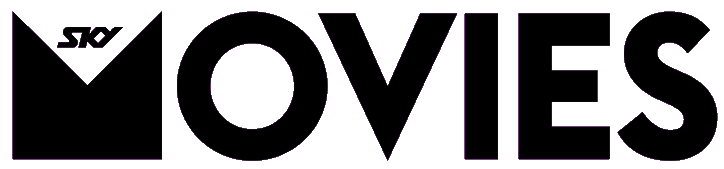
Sky Movies logo used from 2013–2019

The original Sky Movies channel was started on 18 May 1990 when Sky Television was first launched. When Sky Movies began, it initially screened two hours of 'general entertainment' programming from noon until 2pm (such as Ask Dr. Ruth, Loving, The Beachcombers, America's Top 10, Wild World of Animals, Fun in the Sun and The Ewoks).

These programmes were followed by movies from 2pm until around midnight. By September, general entertainment programming was dropped and movies ran from noon until around midnight, with an extra midnight movie on Friday and Saturday nights. From mid-December 1990 until January 1992, Sky Movies aired from noon until around 2am daily. On 1 November 1996, the channel started timesharing with Cartoon Network from 6am-4pm. This arrangement ended on 1 January 1997, when the Cartoon Network content moved to Orange due to subscriber feedback.

Sky Movies commenced 24-hour programming in February 1992, initially on weekends and during public holidays, then expanded to 24-hour, seven-day-a-week programming on 1 January 1997. In 1993, Sky Television sold the channel to HBO Asia. It became known as HBO, but later reverted to its former name Sky Movies on 1 June 1998, after HBO Asia re-sold the channel to Sky Television. The new goal was to distinguish in-house channels from new channels that were set to arrive to its upcoming digital package later in the year. NICAM stereo broadcasting was available on the UHF channel until around 1998 when Sky launched their digital service. All current Sky Movie channels broadcast in at least stereo sound.

A second movie channel, Sky Movies Max was released in 1999 after Sky launched their digital satellite service. All future Sky Movies channels that were launched were available on the Sky Digital platform only, the original movie channel was the only channel to ever broadcast on the now discontinued UHF analogue service.

Sky Movies Max broadcast in widescreen 16:9 format from 2002 onwards. Sky Movies also broadcast in widescreen 16:9 format on Sky Digital from 1 January 2005 onwards, however it continued to broadcast in 4:3 on the UHF service.

Sky Movies was renamed Sky Movies 1 in 2004 and Sky Movies Max was renamed Sky Movies 2. Sky Movies 1 reverted to the Sky Movies name in 2007 following the launch of Sky Movies Greats. At the same time, Sky Movies 2 became a time-shift channel, screening the same movies as Sky Movies, just 2 hours behind. Sky Movies 2 remained a time-shift channel until 2013.

In 2008 Sky launched the HD service called My Sky HDi, as a result of which, some Sky Movie channels became available in High Definition. To receive Sky Movies channels in HD, the Sky subscriber is required to upgrade his or her Sky decoder to a My Sky HDi decoder. The subscriber must also pay a monthly fee for an HD access ticket which allows the subscriber to receive selected Sky channels in High Definition. All Sky Movies channels are currently broadcast in HD.

On 1 November 2013, Sky rebranded their movie channel line-up with new logos. The original Sky Movies channel became Sky Movies Premiere and Sky Movies 2 became Sky Movies Extra, an additional channel Sky Movies Action was also introduced.

On 7 May 2015 Sky and the Walt Disney Company announced the launch of Sky Movies Disney, dedicated to Disney family movies launching on 1 July 2015.

On 23 June 2021, Sky's movie channels and schedules were updated, resulting in more variety and fewer repeats. Sky Movies Vintage ceased to operate from 2 August 2021, with vintage films (from the 1940s to the mid-1970s) moving to Sky Movies Classics. Sky Movies Extra was rebranded as Sky Movies Comedy on 9 August 2021, and on the same date a new channel, Sky Movies Collection, was launched to screen films to fit a regularly updated theme (replacing Sky Movies Pop-Up).

== Channels ==
=== Sky Movies Premiere ===
Sky Movies Premiere (formally known as Sky Movies) is Sky's original movie channel in New Zealand. Sky Movies Premiere plays a schedule of movies back to back 24 hours a day. This schedule is updated each month. New movies are added weekly with the Blockbuster Premiere on Sunday nights and the Thursday Premiere on Thursday nights. The range of movies includes bona fide blockbusters, comedies, action titles, dramas, thrillers, science-fiction, horrors, westerns, romances, festival cinema and family features.

=== Sky Movies Comedy ===
Sky Movies Comedy is Sky's second movie channel, screening comedy films.

Sky's second movie channel was launched with their digital service originally known as Sky MovieMax. The name was changed around 2004 to Sky Movies 2. The channel has always broadcast in widescreen with the original Sky Movies channel originally maintaining a standard 4:3 format to give viewers a choice of viewing a movie in widescreen or standard format.

From 2007 until 2013 Sky Movies 2 was a time shift channel screening the same movies as the original Sky Movies channel but 2 hours delayed.

Sky Movies 2 became Sky Movies Extra in November 2013 and began running its own schedule of drama, romance and thriller movies.

On 9 August 2021, Sky Movies Extra was rebranded as Sky Movies Comedy.

=== Sky Movies Action ===
Sky Movies Action is a channel that was introduced in 2013. The channel screens action films.

=== Sky Movies Greats ===
Sky Movies Greats screens a collection of modern classic movies. The channel first launched in 2007 as a third Sky Movies channel.

=== Sky Movies Classics ===
Sky Movies Classics plays classic films from the 60s, 70s, 80s and early 90s. The channel first launched on 1 June 2013 replacing the MGM Channel which began on 3 June 2001. The channel screens an array of films from the MGM library and movies from other studios too.

=== Sky Movies Family ===
Sky Movies Family plays a mix of animated and live-action family films. The channel began in September 2013 as a pop-up channel during the school holidays. It became a 24-hour channel on 1 November 2019.

== Former channels ==
=== Sky Movies Disney ===
Sky Movies Disney launched on 1 July 2015. The channel aired a mix of classic and premiere animated and live-action family films 24 hours a day. The channel closed on 31 October 2019.

=== Sky Movies Vintage ===
Sky Movies Vintage launched on 1 December 2018 replacing the Turner Classic Movies (TCM) channel. The channel played classic movies from the golden age of Hollywood. Movies screened were from the 1940s to mid 1970s.

On 2 August 2021, Sky Movies Vintage ceased broadcasting and all classic film content was transferred to Sky Movies Classics on 1 August 2021.

=== Sky Movies Pop-Up ===
Additional Sky Movies Pop-Up channels were frequently broadcast for a certain period with certain themes. Some themes that have been broadcast in the past include Clint Eastwood, Star Wars, Christmas & Harry Potter Pop-Up channels. Sky Movies Pop-Up was replaced by Sky Movies Collection on 9 August 2021.

=== Sky Movies Collection ===
Sky Movies Collection launched on 9 August 2021 replacing Sky Movies Pop-Up. The channel screens films to fit a regularly updated theme such as franchises, local, romance, war, or Christmas movies. The channel closed on June 4, 2024.
