= Das Boot (disambiguation) =

Das Boot is a 1981 German war film and 1985 TV mini series based on Lothar-Günther Buchheim's eponymous 1973 book. Das Boot is German for "The Boat".

Das Boot may also refer to:

- Das Boot (novel), the source novel by Lothar-Günther Buchheim from 1973
- "Das Boot" (song), title theme to the film, composed and produced by Klaus Doldinger; 1991 covered by U96
- Das Boot (2018 TV series), a German television series sequel to the 1981 film and 1985 series
- Das Boot (album), a 1992 album by U96 from 1992
- Das Boot (video game), a 1991 video game inspired by the novel of the same name
- "Das Boot" (Peep Show), a television episode
- A plot device in the 2006 comedy movie Beerfest

== See also ==
- "Dos Boot", an episode of Dexter's Laboratory
- "Das Bus", an episode of The Simpsons
- "Das Boob", an episode of Will & Grace
- Das U-Boot, a computer program
- The Boat (disambiguation)
