= DJ F.R.A.N.K. =

Belgian DJ

Frank Van Herwegen (born in Schoten, Belgium on December 10, 1970), better known as DJ F.R.A.N.K. (sometimes DJ Frank or DJ F.r.a.n.k.), is a Belgian DJ and record producer with a great number of charting hits in Belgium, and at times in the Netherlands, France and Finland.

He started at 16, DJing at social events and worked as a record seller in Antwerp working for 4 years. In 1995, he opened a private DJ store with his a DJ colleague, AJ Duncan and DJed at DIXIES Brasschaat.

His most lucrative period came when in the early 2000s, when he was included in the Belgian-German dance group the Underdog Project as the group's remixer. The 4-member group also included Crag Smart and Vic Krishna on vocals and AJ Duncan on keyboards. It released the commercially successful album It Doesn't Matter that reached number 2 on both the German and Australian albums charts.

The project enjoyed big hits like "Summer Jam", "Saturday Night", "Tonight, and "Girls of Summer", amongst others. "Summer Jam" was certified gold in France and Germany, and double platinum in Belgium and the Netherlands. "Saturday Night" became a pan-European hit charting in Belgium, Finland, France, the Netherlands, Denmark, Norway and Sweden.

The single "My Arms Keep Missing You" in the summer of 2006 was a big charting hit in collaboration with Danzel, a Belgian dance musician. Between 2006 and 2008, DJ Frank also released hits under the pseudonym Frank Ti-Aya in cooperation with Yardi Don, an alter ego name for singer Craig Smart. DJ Frank also reached the top of the Belgian Ultratop chart in 2011 with "Discotex! (Yah!)", his highest charting solo hit.

== Discography ==
=== Singles ===
Solo and collaborations

Year	Single	Peak positions			
Year	Single	BEL (Fl)	BEL (Wa)	FR	NED
2000	"Story"	4* (Ultratip)	–	48	–
2004	"Nu Nu" (feat. Vick Krishna)	5	9* (Ultratip)	–	48
2010	"Missing 2010"	21* (Ultratip)	–	–	–
2011	"Discotex! (Yah!)"	1	5	89	45
2011	"Put the Light on the Lady" (featuring Michael Houston)	16	41	–	–
2011	"It's Like That"	36	–	–	–
2012	"Blu Sky Holiday" (feat. Craig Smart)	46	24* (Ultratip)	–	–
2013	"Yes You Run!" (feat. Miss Autumn Leaves)	24	3* (Ultratip)	–	–
2013	"Burning It Up" (feat. Craig Smart & Tom-E)	26	21* (Ultratip)	–	–
2013	"From the Left to the Right"	36	–	–	–
2014	"Good Life" (feat. Craig Smart)	47* (Ultratip)	–	–	–
2014	"Alles kapput"	83* (Ultratip)		–	–
2014	"Salvation" (feat. Jessy)	35	–	–	–

as part of The Underdog Project (selective)

- 2000: "Summer Jam"
- 2000: "Tonight"
- 2002: "Saturday Night"
- 2003: "Summer Jam (2003)"

See more details and chart positions in discography of The Underdog Project article

As Frank Ti-Aya

Year	Single	Peak positions		
Year	Single	BEL (Fl)	BEL (Wa)	FIN
2006	"One Love, World Love" (feat. Yardi Don)	12	7* (Ultratip)	6
2007	"Unity" (feat. Yardi Don)	42	–	5
2008	"It's da Music" (feat. Yardi Don)	24* (Ultratip)	–	–

Featured in recordings

Year	Single	Peak positions			
Year	Single	BEL (Fl)	BEL (Wa)	FR	NED
2005	"In da Club" (Cüva feat. DJ F.R.A.N.K.)	13	11* (Ultratip)	57	71
2005	"Anybody Out There" (Cüva feat. DJ F.R.A.N.K.)	25	–	–	–
2006	"My Arms Keep Missing You" (Danzel vs. DJ F.R.A.N.K.)	15	2* (Ultratip)	–	–
2013	"Pump It Up 2k14" (Danzel vs. DJ F.R.A.N.K.)	31* (Ultratip)	–	–	–
2015	"All By Myself" (DJ F.R.A.N.K. vs. Sonic Solutions)	77* (Ultratip)	–	–	–

*Did not appear in the official Belgian Ultratop 50 charts, but rather in the bubbling under Ultratip charts.
