= Boat (disambiguation) =

A boat is a nautical craft of modest size.

Boat or BOAT may also refer to:

== Water travel ==
- Ship, a larger water vessel
- Submarine, a vessel capable of underwater travel
- The members of a crew in the sport of rowing

== Organisations and companies ==
- Brownsea Open Air Theatre, Dorset, England

== Music ==
- BOAT, an American indie rock band
- "Boat" (Ed Sheeran song), 2023
- "Boat" (Trim song), 2025

== Film and television ==
- Boat (2007 film), a short film directed by David Lynch
- Boat (2009 film), a Japanese-South Korean film
- Das Boot, German for The Boat, 1981 German film
  - "The Boat" (song), from the film
- The Boat (1921 film), with Buster Keaton
- Boat (2024 film), an Indian survival drama film
- "Boat" (Not Going Out), a 2013 television episode

== People ==
- Billy Boat, American racecar driver
  - Chad Boat, son of Billy
- Dave Boat, American voice actor

== Other uses ==
- Boat (politics), electoral symbol
- Boat, Kentucky, an unincorporated community
- Boat Branch, a stream in Tennessee
- Boat Mountain, a summit in Montana, US
- Byway open to all traffic, a type of byway (road) in England & Wales
- Full house (poker), a type of poker hand
- Boat, a trade reporting platform owned by Markit Group Limited
- Vernon C. Bain Correctional Center or "The Boat", a New York floating prison
- Scaphism, or The Boats, an ancient execution method
- Boat, a drawing by Hamid Naderi Yeganeh
- Boat, an incense container in Christian liturgies
- Boat, a still life in Conway's Game of Life
- "Brightest Of All Time", the astronomical gamma ray burst GRB 221009A

== See also ==
- The Boat (disambiguation)
- Ship (disambiguation)
