= A Night to Remember (U96 song) =

Single by U96

from the album Heaven
- B-side: "Remix"
- Released: 1996
- Genre: House; trance
- Length: 3:30
- Label: Guppy
- Songwriters: Helmut Hoinkis; Alex Christensen; Ingo Hauss; Hayo Panarinfo
- Producers: Matiz; Alex Christensen

U96 singles chronology
"Heaven" (1996)	"A Night to Remember" (1996)	"Venus in Chains" (1996)

Music video
- "A Night to Remember" on YouTube

"A Night to Remember" is a song recorded by German dance act U96, released in 1996 by Guppy label as the second single from the act's fourth album, Heaven (1996). The song was a top 20 hit in Austria and Finland, and a top 30 hit in Germany. On the Eurochart Hot 100, it reached number 66 in August 1996. A computer generated music video was produced to promote the single, directed by Paul Morgans. He had previously directed the videos for the act's hit singles "Club Bizarre" and "Heaven". In Pan-European magazine Music & Media's review of the parent album, "A Night to Remember" was described as "cheerful" and a potential future single.

== Track listing ==
- 12" vinyl (Remixes), Germany
1. "A Night to Remember" (DB 600 Mix) — 7:11
2. "A Night to Remember" (Minuteman Mix) — 5:25
3. "A Night to Remember" (DB 600 Mix) — 5:49
- CD single, Germany
1. "A Night to Remember" (Video Edit) — 3:30
2. "A Night to Remember" (12" Mix) — 5:08
- CD maxi, Europe
1. "A Night to Remember" (Video Edit) — 3:30
2. "A Night to Remember" (12" Mix) — 5:08
3. "A Night to Remember" (Bass Bumpers Mix) — 7:21
4. "Anthem" — 3:18

== Charts ==
Chart (1996)	Peak position
Austria (Ö3 Austria Top 40)	18
Europe (Eurochart Hot 100)	66
Finland (Suomen virallinen lista)	11
Germany (GfK)	25
Sweden (Sverigetopplistan)	37
Switzerland (Schweizer Hitparade)	44
