= Venus in Chains =

Single by U96

from the album Heaven
- B-side: "Remix"
- Released: 1996
- Genre: House; trance
- Length: 3:30
- Label: Guppy
- Songwriters: Helmut Hoinkis; Alex Christensen; Ingo Hauss; Hayo Panarinfo
- Producer: Matiz / AC 16

U96 singles chronology
"A Night to Remember" (1996)	"Venus in Chains" (1996)	"Seven Wonders" (1997)

Music video
- "Venus in Chains" on YouTube

"Venus in Chains" is a song recorded by German dance act U96, released in 1996 by label Guppy as the third and last single from their fourth album, Heaven (1996). It is co-written by Alex Christensen with Helmut Hoinkis, Ingo Hauss and Hayo Panarinfo, and features vocals by German singer Dorothy Lapi (a.k.a. Dea-Li). The song became a top-10 hit in the Czech Republic, peaking at number seven. Additionally, it was a top-20 hit in Austria and a top-60 hit in Sweden. In the act's native Germany, it reached number 75. The accompanying music video was directed by German music video and film director Martin Weisz.

== Critical reception ==
Pan-European magazine Music & Media wrote in their review of the song in October 1996, "She sings she's a slave in chains. Eurohouse is becoming kinky business with this new single by German submarinehitmachine. The up-tempo beats refrain from hardcore rave frenzy and the melody hooks are definitely catchy."

== Track listing ==
- CD single, Germany
1. "Venus in Chains" (Video Mix) – 3:30
2. "In Chains" – 5:02
- CD maxi, Germany
1. "Venus in Chains" (Video Mix) – 3:30
2. "Venus in Chains" (In Chains) – 5:02
3. "Venus in Chains" (Bass Bumpers Remix) – 5:56
4. "1-900-LOVE" – 4:02
- CD maxi (Remix), Germany
1. "Venus in Chains" (Future Breeze Mix) – 6:47
2. "Venus in Chains" (Klubbheads Venusheuvel Mix) – 6:46

== Charts ==
Chart (1996)	Peak position
Austria (Ö3 Austria Top 40)	18
Czech Republic (IFPI CR)	7
Germany (GfK)	75
Sweden (Sverigetopplistan)	54
