= Ship (disambiguation) =

A ship is a large vessel that floats on water, specifically the ocean and the sea.

Ship or ships may also refer to:

== Transportation ==
- Shipping, basic process of transporting goods and cargo
- Full-rigged ship, known as "ship" in the Age of Sail
- Spacecraft or spaceship, to travel in outer space
- Starship, spacecraft designed for interstellar travel
- Airship, powered lighter-than-air craft
- Landship, watercraft-style large terrestrial land vehicle

== Arts, entertainment, and media ==
=== Books ===
- The Ship (novel), a 1943 novel written by C.S. Forester
- The Ship, a book by Björn Landström
- The Ship, a 1922 play by St. John Greer Ervine
- The Ship (magazine), published annually by St Anne's College, Oxford

=== Film and TV and games ===
- The Ship (film), a 1921 Italian silent historical drama film
- The Ship (TV series), a 2002 documentary film
- The Ship (video game), a first person shooter computer game
- "The Ship" (Star Trek: Deep Space Nine), a 1996 episode of Star Trek: Deep Space Nine

=== Fictional entities ===
- Ship (comics), the Marvel Comics AI used by Apocalypse, X-Factor, and Cable

=== Music ===
- Ships (album) by Danielson
- Ships (Irish band), an Irish band
- Ships (Japanese band), a Japanese boy band
- "Ship", a song by Level 42 on the album Retroglide
- "Ships" (song), 1979, by Ian Hunter
- "Ships + Tides", a song by OneRepublic from Human
- The Ship (album), an album by Brian Eno, 2016
- "The Ship", song by Ivor Gurney

=== Other uses in arts, entertainment, and media ===
- Shipping (fandom), internet phenomenon of involvement with fictional romance
- The Ship (video game), a 2006 first-person shooter video game

== SHIP ==
- INPP5D or SHIP1 (SH2-containing inositol phosphatase 1), an enzyme
- Phosphatidylinositol-3,4,5-trisphosphate 5-phosphatase, an enzyme
- Seed Herbarium Image Project, Harvard University
- State Health Insurance Program, United States, independent advocacy groups
- Study of Health in Pomerania, Germany , a research project

== SHiP ==
- The Search for Hidden Particles, CERN , a flagship particle physics experiment

== Buildings ==
- Hawthorne Smoke Shop, a gambling casino later known as The Ship
- "The Ship", Derriford, an office building in Plymouth, Devon, England
- The Ship (house), a heritage-listed house on the Mornington Peninsula, Melbourne, Victoria, Australia

=== Pubs ===
- Grand View Point Hotel, Bedford County, Pennsylvania, United States, also known as the "Ship Hotel"
- Old Ship Hotel, Brighton, East Sussex, England, formerly called "The Ship"
- Ship Inn, Aldborough, North Yorkshire, England
- Ship Inn, Porthleven, Cornwall, England
- Ship Inn (brewpub), New Jersey, United States
- Ship Inn (Pennsylvania), United States
- Ship Tavern, Holborn, London
- The Ship, Hart Street, Aldgate, London
- The Ship, Lime Street, London, off Fenchurch Street
- The Ship, New Cavendish Street, London
- The Ship, Saltburn-by-the-Sea, North Yorkshire
- The Ship, Scarborough, North Yorkshire
- The Ship Inn, Piel Island, Cumbria, England

== Other uses ==
- Ship (St. Paul's Churchyard), a historical bookseller in London
- A Boy Scouts of America Sea Scout crew level
- Shippensburg University, Pennsylvania, nicknamed "Ship"
- Ships Coffee Shop, Los Angeles, California, US

== See also ==
- Boat (disambiguation)
