= Inside Your Dreams =

Single by U96
- B-side: "Remix"
- Released: 1994
- Genre: House; hi-NRG
- Length: 3:28 (video version)
- Label: Guppy; Logic; Polydor
- Songwriters: Alex Christensen; Ingo Hauss; Helmut Hoinkis; Hayo Panarinfo
- Producers: Alex Christensen; Matiz

U96 singles chronology
"Night in Motion" (1993)	"Inside Your Dreams" (1994)	"Love Religion" (1994)

Music video
- "Inside Your Dreams" on YouTube

"Inside Your Dreams" is a song recorded by German act U96, released in 1994 by various labels as a non-album track. It was written by Alex Christensen, Ingo Hauss, Helmut Hoinkis, Hayo Panarinfo, and produced by Christensen with Matiz. The single was a major hit on the charts in Europe, peaking at number-one in Finland and becoming a top-10 hit in Austria and Switzerland, and a top-20 hit in Denmark and Germany. On the Eurochart Hot 100, it reached number 29 in May 1994. Outside Europe, it was a hit in Israel, peaking at number four. The accompanying music video was directed by Swedish director Fredrik Boklund, known for his videos for Army of Lovers. It was filmed in Sierra Nevada, the US and Málaga, Spain and produced by Apollon Bild&Film. "Inside Your Dreams" received "break out" rotation on MTV Europe and was A-listed on Germany's VIVA in April 1994.

== Critical reception ==
Ian Gittins from Melody Maker wrote, "U96 are the German studio boffins who made the portentous novelty house hit, 'Das Boot', complete with marine sound effects, submarine noises and the legendary lyric Techno, techno, a good year before 2 Unlimited, a huge hit across Europe. 'Inside Your Dreams' is on more of a HiNRG tip and doesn't manage to be remotely as compelling and absurdly addictive."

== Track listing ==
- CD maxi, Europe (1994)
1. "Inside Your Dreams" (Video Version) – 3:28
2. "Inside Your Dreams" (Phase 1) – 7:52
3. "Inside Your Dreams" (Phase 2) – 8:21
- CD maxi (Remixes I), Europe (1994)
1. "Inside Your Dreams" (Damage Control Remix) – 5:35
2. "Inside Your Dreams" (Intermission Remix) – 6:27
3. "Inside Your Dreams" (Ambient Phase 3) – 6:00
- CD maxi (Remixes II), Germany (1994)
1. "Inside Your Dreams" (Dumping Mix) – 6:16
2. "Inside Your Dreams" (Catania Remix) – 6:06

== Charts ==
=== Weekly charts ===
Chart (1994)	Peak position
Austria (Ö3 Austria Top 40)	10
Denmark (IFPI)	11
Europe (Eurochart Hot 100)	29
Europe (European Dance Radio)	18
Finland (Suomen virallinen lista)	1
Germany (GfK)	12
Israel (Israeli Singles Chart)	4
Netherlands (Dutch Top 40)	18
Netherlands (Single Top 100)	24
Sweden (Sverigetopplistan)	19
Switzerland (Schweizer Hitparade)	9
UK Singles (OCC)	44
UK Dance (Music Week)	21
UK Club Chart (Music Week)	45

=== Year-end charts ===
Chart (1994)	Position
Netherlands (Dutch Top 40)	149
