= DJ Frank =

DJ Frank may refer to:

- DJ F.R.A.N.K., at times DJ Frank, Belgian DJ and record producer and at one time remixer of The Underdog Project
- DJ Frank E, American DJ
