= Love Sees No Colour =

1993 single by U96

Single by U96

from the album Replugged
- Released: 21 May 1993
- Genre: Techno-pop; Euro-house
- Length: 3:46 (radio edit)
- Label: Urban
- Songwriters: Alex Christensen; Ingo Hauss; Helmut Hoinkis; Hayo Panarinfo
- Producers: Alex Christensen; Matiz

U96 singles chronology
"I Wanna Be a Kennedy" (1992)	"Love Sees No Colour" (1993)	"Night in Motion" (1993)

Music video
- "Love Sees No Colour" on YouTube

"Love Sees No Colour" is a song by German musical act U96, released in May 1993 by label Urban as the first single off its second album, Replugged (1993), on which it appears as second track. It added sung male vocals, which was also going to be one of the distinctive marks of the project. The words contained in the title are the only lyrics of the song. It is both co-written and co-produced by Alex Christensen and achieved success in many countries, including Austria, Denmark, Finland, Germany, Israel, Spain, Sweden and Switzerland where it became a top-10 hit. On the Eurochart Hot 100, "Love Sees No Colour" peaked at number ten. German band Bass Bumpers participated in several remixes of the song.

== Critical reception ==
Raùl Cairo from Music & Media wrote that "the song is a charming combination of ambient techno sounds with an irresistible poppy hook." Andy Beevers from Music Week described it as "another stomping commercial rave track, this time carrying an anti-fascist message." Ralph Tee from the Record Mirror Dance Update noted, "A big moody wave of synths introduces this Euro house record that sounds strangely dated on first listen with its repeated spoken title line and slightly cheesy bassline, but it grows on you with each play." He added, "Well produced and easy to programme so it's sure to get plenty of attention." Damon Albarn and Alex James of Blur reviewed the song for Smash Hits, giving it a score of four out of five. Albarn said, "It sounds very Germanic. They make music like they make cars. This is Vorsprung durch Technik music. In Germany I expect it is very popular." David Petrilla from The Weekender complimented its "pure uplifting energy", adding that "the familiar heavy synthesizer sequences drove me crazy".

== Track listings ==
- 7" single / CD single
1. "Love Sees No Colour" (version 1 radio edit) — 3:44
2. "The Pop Crisis" — 3:35
- 12" maxi
1. "Love Sees No Colour" (version 1) — 5:57
2. "Love Sees No Colour" (version 2) — 5:57
3. "The Pop Crisis" — 3:35
- CD maxi
1. "Love Sees No Colour" (radio edit) — 3:46
2. "Love Sees No Colour" (version 1) — 5:57
3. "Love Sees No Colour" (version 2) — 5:57
4. "The Pop Crisis" — 3:35
- CD maxi / 12" maxi - Remixes
1. "Love Sees No Colour" (Bass Bumpers remix) — 5:44
2. "Love Sees No Colour" (house mix) — 5:53
3. "Love Sees No Colour" (version 1 instrumental mix) — 5:57

== Credits ==
- Written by AC-Beat, Lagonda, Castioni and Wycombe
- Vocals by Ingo Hauss
- Produced by Matiz / AC 16
- Artwork by Neue Hülle

== Charts ==
=== Weekly charts ===
Chart (1993)	Peak position
Austria (Ö3 Austria Top 40)	3
Belgium (Ultratop 50 Flanders)	39
Denmark (IFPI)	10
Europe (Eurochart Hot 100)	10
Europe (European Dance Radio)	7
Finland (Suomen virallinen lista)	3
France (SNEP)	20
Germany (GfK)	6
Greece (Pop + Rock)	14
Israel (Israeli Singles Chart)	3
Italy (Musica e dischi)	19
Netherlands (Dutch Top 40)	16
Netherlands (Single Top 100)	17
Spain (AFYVE)	5
Sweden (Sverigetopplistan)	4
Switzerland (Schweizer Hitparade)	4
UK Dance (Music Week)	50

=== Year-end charts ===
Chart (1993)	Position
Austria (Ö3 Austria Top 40)	16
Europe (Eurochart Hot 100)	42
Germany (Media Control)	20
Netherlands (Dutch Top 40)	128
Sweden (Topplistan)	46
Switzerland (Schweizer Hitparade)	35
