= Fiesta De Los Tamborileros =

"Fiesta De Los Tamborilero"

Single by The Sunclub

from the album Fiesta
- Released: 1996
- Genre: House
- Length: 3:34 (radio edit)
- Label: Dance Pool
- Songwriter(s): Jaydee, Typar & Atbe
- Producer(s): Jaydee, Typar & Atbe

The Sunclub singles chronology
"Fiesta De Los Tamborilero" (1996)	"Single Minded People" (1997)

"Fiesta De Los Tamborileros" is the debut single by Dutch house group The Sunclub. The song was released in 1996 as the first single from their debut album, Fiesta. The song was re-released in 1998 with vocals by Angie Blake as "Fiesta '98". In 2000, the song was sampled by The Underdog Project on their single "Summer Jam", which was a European hit in 2003. In 2007, "Fiesta" was re-released as "Fiesta Reloaded" with new remixes.

== Track listing ==
- CD single
1. "Fiesta De Los Tamborileros" (radio edit) – 3:34
2. "Fiesta De Los Tamborileros" (video edit) – 3:56
3. "Fiesta De Los Tamborileros" (Sun Tan mix) – 5:37
4. "Fiesta De Los Tamborileros" (Forrest Dream mix) – 8:54

== Charts ==
=== Weekly charts ===
"Fiesta De Los Tamborilero"

Chart (1997)	Peak position
Belgium (Ultratop 50 Flanders)	10
Belgium (Ultratop 50 Wallonia)	39
Germany (GfK)	60
Netherlands (Dutch Top 40)	3
Netherlands (Single Top 100)	4
Sweden (Sverigetopplistan)	20

"Fiesta Reloaded"

Chart (2007)	Peak position
Netherlands (Single Top 100)	33

=== Year-end charts ===
"Fiesta De Los Tamborilero"

Chart (1997)	Position
Belgium (Ultratop Flanders)	65
Netherlands (Dutch Top 40)	35
Netherlands (Single Top 100)	33
