= Club Bizarre =

1995 single by U96

Single by U96

from the album Club Bizarre
- B-side: "Remix"
- Released: 17 February 1995
- Recorded: 1994
- Genre: Eurodance; trance
- Length: 5:00
- Label: Guppy; Motor
- Songwriters: Helmut Hoinkis; Alex Christensen; Ingo Hauss; Hayo Panarinfo
- Producers: Matiz; Alex Christensen

U96 singles chronology
"Love Religion" (1994)	"Club Bizarre" (1995)	"Heaven" (1996)

Music video
- "Club Bizarre" on YouTube

"Club Bizarre" is a song performed by the German musical project U96, created by record producer Alex Christensen. It was released in February 1995, by labels Guppy and Motor, as the second track from the album of the same name (1995), which was U96's third album. "Club Bizarre" was co-written by Christensen with Helmut Hoinkis, Ingo Hauss, Hayo Panarinfo and he also co-produced it. It features vocals by singer Skadi Lange and a sample from Alannah Myles' 1992 song "Song Instead of a Kiss". "Club Bizarre" peaked at number one in Finland as well as becoming a top-20 hit in Austria, Germany, the Netherlands and Sweden. Its accompanying music video was directed by Paul Morgans and filmed in London. In 2001, Brooklyn Bounce released a cover version of the song, which also became a European hit.

== Critical reception ==
In his review of the Club Bizarre album, Larry Flick from Billboard magazine said the song "shows it successfully trying smoother keyboard sounds that complement the simple, but cute hooks anchoring each cut." Pan-European magazine Music & Media wrote, "So unlike anybody else in Euro, the childlike songstress, the melody and the airy sample from Alannah Myles' 'Song Instead of a Kiss' add up to music that's a new nursery rhyme for '90s kids." Head of music Bernd Albrecht by German radio station ORB Fritz/Potsdam enthused, "What a classic melody. You can hear at once that this song stands out off the whole Euro pack." In his 2020 book Move Your Body (2 The 90's): Unlimited Eurodance, Juha Soininen commented, "It mixed strangely ethereal trance sound and strings and added filtered vocals. In addition to that, it was released with a weird music video."

== Chart performance ==
"Club Bizarre" was a major hit in several European countries, peaking at number-one in Finland. It became a top-20 hit in Austria (14), Germany (19), the Netherlands (11) and Sweden (16). Additionally, the single was a top-30 hit in Belgium (30), as well as on the Eurochart Hot 100, where it peaked at number 28 in April 1995, in its fourth week on the chart. On the European Dance Radio Chart, it reached number eleven four weeks later, becoming the eleventh most-played dance song on European radio that week. In the United Kingdom, "Club Bizarre" was a smaller hit, peaking at number 70, but on the UK Dance Singles Chart, it reached number 25 on its first week in June 1996.

== Music video ==
The music video for "Club Bizarre" was directed by Paul Morgans and filmed in London, the UK. The partially computer generated and surreal video includes Skadi Lange as a female singer in an aerial cage. Then different performance artists on stilts and female models appears on a virtually beach. In the middle of the video, Lange appears as a green seahorse in a aquarium. Frontman and producer of U96, Alex Christensen, appears in the end of the video, where Lange returns in the cage, in front of a gate to a castle. "Club Bizarre" received active rotation on MTV Europe and was B-listed on German music television channel VIVA in March and April 1995.

== Track listings ==
- CD single
1. "Club Bizarre" (airplay version) — 5:00
2. "Club Bizarre" (club mix) — 5:15
- CD maxi / 12" maxi
1. "Club Bizarre" (airplay version) — 5:00
2. "Club Bizarre" (club mix) — 5:13
3. "Club Bizarre" (helium mix) — 4:54
4. "Club Bizarre" (bizarre) — 5:10
- 12" maxi - UK
1. "Club Bizarre" (the Candy Girl mix) — 6:10
2. "Club Bizarre" (extended mix) — 6:28
3. "Club Bizarre" (club mix) — 5:14
4. "Club Bizarre" (Ken Doh mix) — 6:25
5. "Club Bizarre" (acid dub mix) — 5:14
6. "Club Bizarre" (acido mix) — 5:14
- 12" maxi - Remixes / CD maxi - Remixes
1. "Club Bizarre" (Mandala remix) — 5:23
2. "Club Bizarre" (Perplexer remix) — 5:17
3. "Club Bizarre" (DJ Tom and Norman remix) — 4:45
4. "Club Bizarre" (Steve Baltes remix) — 4:58

== Credits ==
- Artwork by H. Hoffman
- Sleeve design by D. Rudolph
- Produced by Matiz and AC 16

== Charts ==
=== Weekly charts ===
Chart (1995–1996)	Peak position
Austria (Ö3 Austria Top 40)	14
Belgium (Ultratop 50 Flanders)	37
Belgium (Ultratop 50 Wallonia)	30
Europe (Eurochart Hot 100)	28
Europe (European Dance Radio)	11
Finland (Suomen virallinen lista)	1
France (SNEP)	44
Germany (Media Control Charts)	19
Netherlands (Dutch Top 40)	11
Netherlands (Single Top 100)	12
Scotland (OCC)	68
Sweden (Sverigetopplistan)	16
Switzerland (Schweizer Hitparade)	32
UK Singles (OCC)	70
UK Dance (OCC)	25
UK Club Chart (Music Week)	50

=== Year-end charts ===
Chart (1995)	Position
Netherlands (Dutch Top 40)	86
Netherlands (Single Top 100)	95

== Brooklyn Bounce version ==
"Club Bizarre"

Single by Brooklyn Bounce

from the album Restart
- B-side: "Remix"
- Released: 5 November 2001
- Recorded: 2000
- Genre: Progressive house, progressive electronic dance music
- Length: 3:46
- Label: Epic, Dance Division
- Songwriters: Helmut Hoinkis, Alex Christensen, Ingo Hauss, Hayo Panarinfo
- Producers: Dennis Bohn, Matthias Menck

Brooklyn Bounce singles chronology
"Loud & Proud" (2001)	"Club Bizarre" (2001)	"Loud & Proud" (2002)

German house music duo Brooklyn Bounce covered the song on its 2001 album, Restart. The song features vocals by Alexandra Cuevas-Moreno and Ulrica Bohn and was released the same year and achieved some success, particularly in Austria, the Netherlands and Spain, where it was a top ten hit.

=== Track listing ===
- CD single
1. "Club Bizarre" (single edit) — 3:46
2. "Club Bizarre" (DJs @ work remix) — 6:33
3. "Club Bizarre" (Headhunterz & Noisecontrollers RMX)
- CD maxi
1. "Club Bizarre" (single edit) — 3:46
2. "Club Bizarre" (club mix) — 7:39
3. "Club Bizarre (reprise) — 2:10
4. "Club Bizarre (classic mix) — 3:53
5. "Superassbassmother" — 6:32
- 12" maxi
1. "Club Bizarre" (DJs @ work remix) — 6:33
2. "Club Bizarre" (club mix) — 7:39
3. "Club Bizarre" (DJ Scot Project remix) — 8:55
4. "Club Bizarre" (Tomcraft remix) — 7:02

=== Credits ===
Brooklyn Bounce version

- Produced by Dennis "Bonebreaker" Bohn and Matthias "Double M" Menck
- Recorded by Christoph Brüx
- Recorded, arranged, mixed, engineered, performed by Dennis "Bonebreaker" Bohn, Matthias "Double M" Menck and Christoph Brüx
- Vocals by Alexandra Cuevas-Moreno and Ulrica Bohn

=== Charts ===
==== Weekly charts ====
Chart (2001–02)	Peak position
Austria (Ö3 Austria Top 40)	9
Belgium (Ultratop 50 Flanders)	16
Denmark (Tracklisten)	20
Germany (Media Control Charts)	12
Hungary (Mahasz)	14
Netherlands (Dutch Top 40)	4
Netherlands (Single Top 100)	3
Spain (AFYVE)	8
Switzerland (Schweizer Hitparade)	41

==== Year-end charts ====
Chart (2002)	Position
Netherlands (Dutch Top 40)	56
Netherlands (Single Top 100)	31
