= Boytronic =

German electropop group

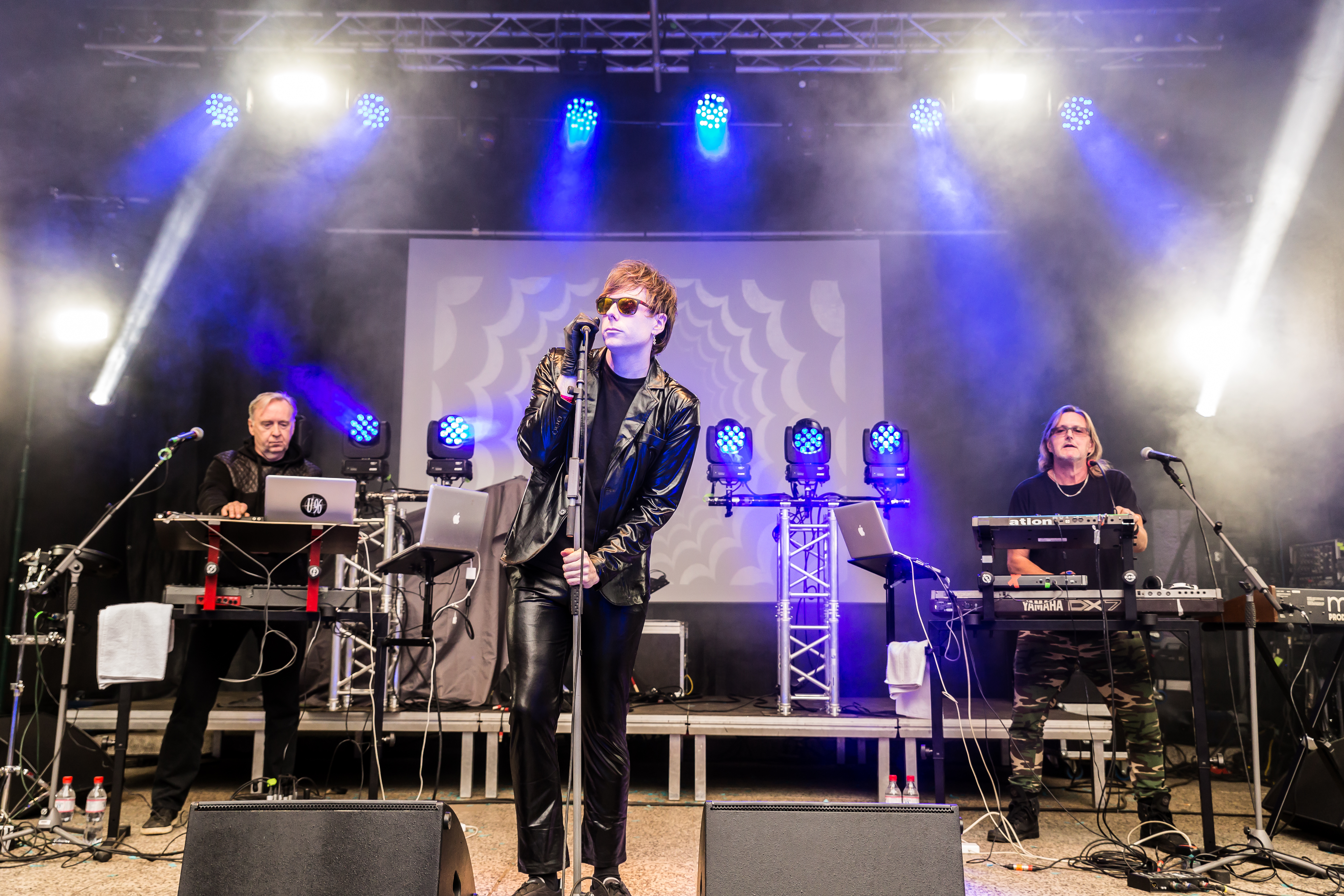
- The German synth-pop band Boytronic at the Nocturnal Culture Night 12 2017 in Deutzen/Germany.

Background information
- Also known as: Bryllyant Berger and The Tronic Twins
- Origin: Hamburg, Germany
- Genres: Electropop
- Years active: 1982–present
- Members: Holger Wobker; James Knights
- Past members: Peter Sawatzki-Bär; Klaus Dufke; Claus Stockhausen; Charlie Schöppner; Mark Wade; Hayo Lewerentz; Alberto Ingo Hauss; Helmut Hoinkis; Hans Johm; Michael Maria Ziffels
- Website: boytronic.com

Boytronic is a German electropop music group. It was founded in 1983 by Holger Wobker and Peter Sawatzki in Hamburg, Germany as Kapitän Sehnsucht (Captain Desire). The original Boytronic released two synthpop albums: The Working Model (1983) and The Continental (1985). The record company, claiming rights to the band name, put together a completely different line-up in 1986. It was headed by Hayo Lewerentz (Hayo Panarinfo) (U96/Major Records) and continued to record under the Boytronic name until the mid-1990s. In 2002, Boytronic was revived by Wobker from the original group and Panarinfo from the second incarnation. They released the albums Autotunes, Maxi and remastered editions of The Working Model (Reverse) and The Continental (Replace) with bonus tracks. The albums were released on Hayo Lewerentz label Major Records.

Wobker teamed up with his Beachhead bandmate Hans Johm (Antlers Mulm) and Michael Maria Ziffels for the Dependence (2006) album. On this album the song "Forever" from The Continental album, sees its German version as "Für Immer".

The band had three charting singles in Germany. In a 1986 NME interview, Curtis Mantronik said that he had adopted his pseudonym, and the name Mantronix, from an imported recording by this group.

== Group members ==
=== 1982–1985 ===
- Bryllyant Berger (aka Holger Wobker)
- Peter Sawatzki-Bär
- Klaus Stockhausen
- Charly Schöppner (had his own band as well: "Electric Theatre")
- Klaus Dufke

=== 1986–1987 ===
- Hayo Lewerentz (Hayo Panarinfo)
- Bela Lagonda

=== 1987–1993 ===
- Mark Wade
- Alberto Hauss (aka Bela Lagonda)
- Hayo Lewerentz

=== 1994–1995 ===
- Hayo Panarinfo
- Bela Lagonda

=== 2002–2005 ===
- Holger Wobker
- Hayo Panarinfo

=== 2006 ===
- Holger Wobker
- Hans Johm (Antlers Mulm)
- Michael Maria Ziffels

=== 2017 ===
- Hayo Lewerentz
- Alberto Ingo Hauss
- James Knights

=== 2018 ===
- Holger Wobker
- James Knights

== Discography ==
=== Albums ===
- The Working Model (1983)
- The Continental (1985)
- Love for Sale (1988)
- The Heart And The Machine (1992)
- Autotunes (2002)
- Dependence (November 2006)
- Jewel (2017)
- The Robot Treatment (2019)

=== Remix albums ===
- Boyzclub Remixes (1991)
- The Robot The Robot Treatment (Remix Pack Piece Of Entertainment And Dancing Wild For You) (2020)

=== Re-released albums ===
- The Working Model – Reverse (bonus tracks) (2003)
- The Continental (Boytronic album)|The Continental (The Replace - bonus tracks) (2005)

=== Unreleased albums ===
- Blueberry Pancake With Maple Syrup (unreleased) (1986)
- A Feather on the Breath of God (unreleased) (1995)

=== Compilations ===
- Maxi (2004)
- The Original Maxi-Singles Collection (2014)
- The Drama Compilation

=== Singles Boytronic ===
- You (1983) GER No. 10
- Diamonds And Loving Arms (1984)
- You (US release) (1984)
- Man In A Uniform (1984)
- Hold On (1984)
- Late Night Satellite (1985)
- Hurts (1986)
- You ('86 release) (1986)
- Bryllyant (1986)
- I Will Survive (1988)
- Tears (1988)
- Don't Let me Down (1988) GER No. 45
- Trigger Track '89 (1989)
- Hold On ('91 release) (1991)
- You ('91 release) (1991)
- Pictures Of You (1992)
- My Baby Lost Her Way (1992)
- Send Me An Angel (1994) GER No. 95
- Blue Velvet (1995)
- Living Without You 1 (2002)
- Living Without You 2 (2002)
- Time After Midnight (2017)
- All You Can Eat (2019)

=== As KAMERATA - Holger Wobker, Ralf Martens ===
==== Album ====
- Lovers & Other Strangers (1988)

==== Singles ====
- Charlotte (1987)
- Heroin (1987)
- Horseback (1988)

=== As BEACHHEAD- Holger Wobker, Hans Johm ===
- Drowning Tonight (2006)

== See also ==
- U96
