= The Boat =

The Boat(s) may refer to:

- The Boat (1921 film), an American short comedy film
- The Boat (2018 film), a Maltese film
- The Boat (2022 film), an Italian film
- "The Boat" (Lucky Feller), a 1976 television episode
- "The Boat" (The Office), a 2012 episode of the American television series
- The Boat (novel), a 1949 novel by L.P. Hartley
- The Boat (short story collection), a 2008 book by Nam Le
- The boats, or scaphism, an alleged ancient method of execution
- The Boat, a nickname for Mayflower, the ship that carried the Pilgrims to America
- The Boat, a local name for the Tuxedo Princess, one of the Tuxedo floating nightclubs in the United Kingdom
- "The Boat", a 2001 song by Electrelane from Rock It to the Moon

== See also ==
- Das Boot (disambiguation)
- Le Bateau (The Boat), a 1953 paper-cut by Henri Matisse
- Boat (disambiguation)
- The Ship (disambiguation)
