= Ritmo de la noche =

Song written by AC Beat, Lagonda, Castioni, and Wycombe

Single by Chocolate

from the album Rhythmflowerbeats
- Released: 1990
- Genre: House
- Length: 3:37
- Label: Teldec
- Songwriters: AC Beat, Lagonda, Castioni, Wycombe
- Producers: Matiz, AC 16

Chocolate singles chronology
"Ritmo de la noche" (1990)	"Brazil! Brazil!" (1990)

"Ritmo de la noche" (Rhythm of the Night) is a song written by AC Beat, Lagonda, Castioni, and Wycombe, and originally recorded by German house group Chocolate in 1990. It was covered and released in the same year by Mystic, The Sacados, Lorca, and ten other producers.

== Background ==
The opening piano riff of the song was sampled from "I Go to Rio" by Australian artist Peter Allen.

== Track listing ==
CD maxi

1. "Ritmo de la noche" (Brazilmix) - 5:11
2. "Ritmo de la noche" (Single-Edit) - 3:37
3. "Ritmo de la noche" (New Age House-Mix) - 5:56

7" single

1. "Ritmo de la noche" (Single-Edit) - 3:37
2. "Ritmo de la noche" (New Age Edit) - 3:55

== Charts ==
=== Weekly charts ===
Chart (1990)	Peak position
Europe (Eurochart Hot 100 Singles)	74
Finland (Suomen virallinen lista)	30
Germany (GfK)	23
Netherlands (Dutch Top 40)	8
Netherlands (Single Top 100)	12

=== Year-end charts ===
Chart (1990)	Position
Germany (Official German Charts)	95
Netherlands (Single Top 100)	85

== Lorca version ==
"Ritmo de la noche"

Single by Lorca
- Released: 1990
- Genre: House
- Length: 3:48
- Label: Carrere
- Songwriters: AC Beat, Lagonda, Castioni, Wycombe
- Producers: Jean-Jacques Huet, Pascal Rivaton

Lorca singles chronology
"Ritmo de la noche" (1990)	"Los ninos del soul" (1990)

In 1990, French house group Lorca covered the song and it reached number-one in Belgium and peaked in the top 30 in France and the Netherlands.

=== Track listing ===
1. "Ritmo de la noche" (Radio Mix) - 3:48
2. "Ritmo de la noche" (Sun Maxi Mix) - 6:17
3. "Come On" - 5:06

=== Charts ===
Chart (1990)	Peak position
Belgium (Ultratop 50 Flanders)	1
Europe (Eurochart Hot 100 Singles)	56
France (SNEP)	22
Netherlands (Dutch Top 40)	29
Netherlands (Single Top 100)	23

== Mystic version ==
"Ritmo de la noche"

Single by Mystic
- Released: 2 July 1990 (UK)
- Genre: House
- Length: 3:51
- Label: Fanfare
- Songwriters: AC Beat, Lagonda, Castioni, Wycombe
- Producers: Mystic Productions, Night Wright

Mystic singles chronology
"Ritmo de la noche" (1990)	"Yo te quiero" (1991)

In 1990, German house group Mystic covered the song and reached number 2 in Spain and the top 30 in the Netherlands.

=== Track listing ===
1. "Ritmo de la noche" (Radio Mix) - 3:51
2. "Ritmo de la noche" (Club Edit) - 3:03

=== Charts ===
Chart (1990)	Peak position
Netherlands (Dutch Top 40)	24
Netherlands (Single Top 100)	17
Spain (PROMUSICAE)	2
UK Singles (OCC)	77

== Other versions ==
In 1990, Argentine group The Sacados covered the song. Unlike the original version, this added a rap-style lyric. It was used as the opening tune for Telefe program Ritmo de la Noche.

== See also ==
- Every Teardrop Is a Waterfall
