= Night in Motion =

Single by U96

from the album Replugged
- B-side: "Brainkiller"
- Released: 1993
- Genre: House; trance
- Length: 3:19 (video version)
- Label: Urban
- Songwriters: Alex Christensen; Ingo Hauss; Helmut Hoinkis; Hayo Panarinfo
- Producers: Alex Christensen; Matiz

U96 singles chronology
"Love Sees No Colour" (1993)	"Night in Motion" (1993)	"Inside Your Dreams" (1994)

Music video
- "Night in Motion" on YouTube

"Night in Motion" is a song recorded by German musical act U96, released in 1993 by label Urban as the second single from their second album, Replugged (1993). It was written by its co-producer Alex Christensen with Ingo Hauss, Helmut Hoinkis, Hayo Panarinfo. The single was a hit on the charts in Europe, peaking within the top-10 in Austria, Finland, Germany, Lithuania and Sweden. Outside Europe, the song was a huge hit in Israel, peaking at number-one.

== Critical reception ==
Raùl Cairo from Pan-European magazine Music & Media wrote that the song "has a strong potential to cross over to more pop oriented audiences".

== Chart performance ==
"Night in Motion" was successful on the singles charts in several countries in Europe, entering the top-10 in Austria (7), Finland (7), Germany (9), Lithuania (6), and Sweden (10). In Germany, it spent two weeks as number nine and 16 weeks within the German Singles Chart. Additionally, it was a top-20 hit in Switzerland, a top-30 hit in France, and a top-40 hit in the Netherlands. The single debuted on the Eurochart Hot 100 at number 55 on 21 August 1993, after charting in Austria, Denmark, Germany, Sweden and Switzerland. It peaked at number 25 seven weeks later, after charting also in Belgium and Finland. On the European Dance Radio Chart, "Night in Motion" also peaked at number 25. Outside Europe the song reached number-one in Israel in late August 1993.

== Track listing ==
- CD maxi, Europe (1993)
1. "Night in Motion" (video version) – 3:19
2. "Night in Motion" (12" version) – 4:54
3. "Night in Motion" (12" version 2) – 5:19
4. "Night in Motion" (70's mix) – 5:13
- CD maxi, Germany (1993)
1. "Night in Motion" (Bass Bumpers remix) – 5:57
2. "Brainkiller" – 4:32

== Charts ==
=== Weekly charts ===
Chart (1993)	Peak position
Austria (Ö3 Austria Top 40)	7
Belgium (Ultratop Flanders)	50
Europe (Eurochart Hot 100)	25
Europe (European Dance Radio)	25
Finland (Suomen virallinen lista)	7
France (SNEP)	29
Germany (Official German Charts)	9
Israel (Israeli Singles Chart)	1
Lithuania (M-1)	6
Netherlands (Dutch Top 40 Tipparade)	4
Netherlands (Single Top 100)	38
Sweden (Sverigetopplistan)	10
Switzerland (Schweizer Hitparade)	18

=== Year-end charts ===
Chart (1993)	Position
Germany (Media Control)	55
Israel (Israeli Singles Chart)	40
Sweden (Topplistan)	41
