= Good Fun (song) =

Single by Bass Bumpers
- Released: 1994
- Studio: Orange Room Studio; Dollhouse Studio
- Genre: Eurodance; techno
- Label: EastWest; Ultraphonic
- Songwriters: Caba Kroll; Henning Reith; Felicia Uwaje; Ian Freeman
- Producer: Bass Bumpers Music Production

Bass Bumpers singles chronology
"The Music's Got Me!" (1992)	"Good Fun" (1994)	"Keep on Pushing" (1995)

Music video
- "Good Fun" on YouTube

"Good Fun" is a song by German DJ and record production team Bass Bumpers, released in 1994 by EastWest and Ultraphonic as a single only. It was a notable hit in Europe, especially in Spain and Finland, where it peaked at number three and nineteen, respectively. The song was also a top-40 hit in Switzerland. The accompanying music video was directed by Nick Burgess-Jones. Pan-European magazine Music & Media wrote in their review of the song, "Minimalistic techno is the fare here and once again this outfit proves that sticking to the basics is quite often the best. The song itself has a conventional structure, which gives it some pop crossover appeal as well."

== Track listing ==
- 12", Europe (1994)
1. "Good Fun" (12" Power Mix) – 7:11
2. "Good Fun" (Hard Attack Mix) – 7:02
- 12" (Remixes), Spain (1995)
1. "Good Fun" (Damage Control Mix) – 5:10
2. "Good Fun" (Peter Parker Mix) – 5:46
3. "Good Fun" (The World's Address Mix) – 8:50
- CD single, France (1994)
1. "Good Fun" (7" Radio Mix) – 3:25
2. "Good Fun" (12" Power Mix) – 7:11
- CD maxi, Germany (1994)
1. "Good Fun" (7" Radio Mix) – 3:25
2. "Good Fun" (12" Power Mix) – 7:11
3. "Good Fun" (Hard Attack Mix) – 7:02
4. "Good Fun" (Acapella) – 5:25

== Charts ==
Chart (1994)	Peak position
Europe (European Hot 100)	82
Europe (European Dance Radio)	20
Finland (IFPI)	19
Spain (AFYVE)	3
Switzerland (Schweizer Hitparade)	39
