= It Doesn't Matter (album) =

Studio album by The Underdog Project
- Released: (United States) 24 July 2001 (Europe) 20 November 2000
- Genres: R&B, reggae fusion, UK garage
- Length: 52:19
- Label: Radikal Records
- Producers: ToneDef, Triple S

It Doesn't Matter is the debut album by The Underdog Project, released in Germany on 20 November 2000 on Radikal Records. The album combines a variety of music styles like R&B, 2-step beats and reggae; there are also ballads and a cappella tracks included. The album received a lot of attention in Germany; it was later released in the United States on 24 July 2001. It Doesn't Matter released a total of three singles: "Summer Jam", "Tonight" and "I Can't Handle It".

== Reception ==
It Doesn't Matter debuted at number two on the German album charts. It remained for several weeks but never reached the number one position. The album had most success in Germany and Australia. "Summer Jam" was one of the most successful singles from the album. The track reached number three on the German Top 100 singles chart for the entire summer of 2000. Then, the second single off the album, "Tonight", was not considered a hit, although it stayed for several weeks in the German Top 100 singles chart. On 28 May 2001, "I Can't Handle It", the third and final single was released staying at the top of the charts in Germany. Due to the success of the first single, remixes were included on 2003 and 2004 releases of the album, including two new songs: "Saturday" and "Winter Jam".

== Track listing ==
It Doesn't Matter
No.	Title	Length
1.	"Summer Jam"	3:30
2.	"Vibin'"	3:36
3.	"Saturday"	4:58
4.	"I Can't Handle It"	3:56
5.	"4 a.m."	5:23
6.	"Half a Woman"	3:56
7.	"Trippin'"	4:34
8.	"For the Ladies"	3:41
9.	"Tonight"	3:14
10.	"No More" (Accapella Skid)	2:56
11.	"Selecta"	3:56
12.	"All Night"	3:34
13.	"Summer Jam" (Unplugged)	4:00
Total length:		52:19

It Doesn't Matter – US edition
No.	Title	Length
14.	"Summer Jam" (B-15 Project UK Remix)	5:29
15.	"Summer Jam" (Dance Movement Radio Edit)	3:36
Total length:		61:24

== Charts ==
Chart (2000)	Peak position
Germany Top 100 Albums Chart	2
Australia Albums Chart	3
