= I Wanna Be a Kennedy =

Single by U96

from the album Das Boot
- B-side: "220 BPM"; "No Control"; "Is Patsy a Virgin?"; Remix
- Released: February 1992
- Genre: Rave
- Length: 5:30 (album version/US mix); 3:22 (7")
- Label: Polydor
- Songwriter(s): Bela Lagonda; Harry Castioni; Jeff Wycombe; Alex Christensen
- Producer(s): Alex Christensen; Matiz

U96 singles chronology
"Das Boot" (1992)	"I Wanna Be a Kennedy" (1992)	"Love Sees No Colour" (1993)

Music video
- "I Wanna be a Kennedy" on YouTube

"I Wanna Be a Kennedy" is a song recorded by German dance music project U96, released in February 1992 by Polydor as the second single from their debut album, Das Boot (1992). It was co-written and co-produced by the act's frontman Alex Christensen. Musically, the song is very similar to the 1980 song "Fade to Grey" by British new wave band Visage, in which its similarity can be clearly heard in the main synthesizer riff. "I Wanna Be a Kennedy" was successful in Austria, Germany and Switzerland, where it was a top ten hit.

== Critical reception ==
British magazine Music Week gave the song a score of four out of five, stating that U96 "could turn out to be more than one-hit-wonders thanks to 'I Wanna Be a Kennedy', a thumping rave track based on Visage's 'Fade to Grey'. It all sounds a bit dated, but then so did 'Das Boot'."

== Track listings ==
- CD single, 12" maxi
1. "I Wanna Be a Kennedy" (U.S. mix) — 5:25
2. "I Wanna Be a Kennedy" (Patsy-mix) — 5:25
3. "220 BPM" — 3:40
- 12" maxi, CD single - Remixes
1. "I Wanna Be a Kennedy" (Bio-Hazard mix) — 6:00
2. "I Wanna Be a Kennedy" (Digi-Bone mix) — 5:25
3. "No Control" — 4:30
- 12" maxi - UK
1. "I Wanna Be a Kennedy" (U.S. mix edit)
2. "I Wanna Be a Kennedy" (Patsy mix)
3. "I Wanna Be a Kennedy" (Bio-Hazard mix)
4. "I Wanna Be a Kennedy" (Digi-Bone mix)
- 12" maxi - Promo, Germany
1. "I Wanna Be a Kennedy"
2. "I Wanna Be A Kennedy" (untitled mix)
3. "Is Patsy a Virgin?"
- CD single - UK
1. "I Wanna Be a Kennedy" (7") — 3:22
2. "I Wanna Be a Kennedy" (U.S. mix) — 5:33
3. "I Wanna Be a Kennedy" (Patsy mix) — 5:25
4. "I Wanna Be a Kennedy" (Bio-Hazard mix) — 6:01
5. "I Wanna Be a Kennedy" (Digi-Bone mix) — 5:25
- Cassette, double length - UK
1. "I Wanna Be a Kennedy" (7")
2. "I Wanna Be a Kennedy" (Bio-Hazard edit)

== Charts ==
=== Weekly charts ===
Chart (1992)	Peak position
Austria (Ö3 Austria Top 40)	6
Finland (Suomen virallinen lista)	18
France (SNEP) with "Das Boot"	9
Germany (GfK)	4
Netherlands (Dutch Top 40)	36
Netherlands (Single Top 100)	40
Sweden (Sverigetopplistan)	32
Switzerland (Schweizer Hitparade)	3
UK Club Chart (Music Week)	76

=== Year-end charts ===
Chart (1992)	Position
Germany (Media Control)	48
Switzerland (Schweizer Hitparade)	40
