= Tonight (The Underdog Project song) =

Single by The Underdog Project

from the album It Doesn't Matter
- Released: 6 November 2000
- Genre: Freestyle, 2-step (OMO Remix)
- Length: 4:21
- Label: Polygram
- Songwriters: Toni Cottura, Stephan Browarczyk, Shahin Moshirian, Christoph Brüx, N.C. Thanh, Vick Krishna, Craig Smart
- Producer: Triple S

The Underdog Project singles chronology
"Summer Jam" (2000)	"Tonight" (2000)	"I Can't Handle It" (2001)

"Tonight" is a song by the Underdog Project, released in 2000 as the second single from the album It Doesn't Matter. The single is similar to their first hit "Summer Jam", from the same album. There are various mixes of the song, including a 2-step garage mix (OMO Remix) and a Eurodance mix (Dance Movement Remix). The single was also well received in Europe, although it did not garner much airplay in the United States or United Kingdom.

== Track listings ==
- Europe CD maxi-single
1. "Tonight" (Radio Edit) – 3:14
2. "Tonight" (DJ Wickel Mix) – 3:14
3. "Tonight" (O.M.O. Remix) – 4:05
4. "Tonight" (Extended) – 4:19
5. "Tonight" (Accapella) – 3:31
- Canada CD maxi-single (also featuring "Summer Jam")
1. "Tonight" (Radio Edit) – 3:19
2. "Tonight" (DJ Wickel Radio) – 3:14
3. "Tonight" (OMO Remix) – 4:07
4. "Tonight" (Extended Remix) – 4:21
5. "Summer Jam" (Radio Edit) – 3:35
6. "Summer Jam" (Club Mix) – 4:36
7. "Summer Jam" (2 Step Mix) – 3:48
8. "Summer Jam" (Dennis The Menace Club Mix) – 6:03
9. "Summer Jam" (Dennis The Menace Club Mix) – 6:33
- Italy CD maxi-single
1. "Tonight" (Radio Edit) – 3:14
2. "Tonight" (Dance Movement Radio Edit) – 3:33
3. "Tonight" (Dance Movement Extended Version) – 5:04
4. "Tonight" (Free Heads Club Mix) – 4:47
- Netherlands CD single
1. "Tonight" (Radio Edit) – 3:14
2. "Tonight" (O.M.O. Remix) – 4:05
- US CD maxi-single
1. "Tonight" (Original Radio Edit) – 3:14
2. "Tonight" (Dance Movement Radio Edit) – 3:33
3. "Tonight" (DJ Wickel Mix) – 3:14
4. "Tonight" (O.M.O. Remix) – 4:05
5. "Tonight" (Free Heads Club Mix) – 4:47
6. "Tonight" (Dance Movement Remix) – 5:04
- Germany vinyl single
1. "Tonight" (Extended Mix) – 4:19
2. "Tonight" (Extended Instrumental) – 4:19
3. "Tonight" (O.M.O. Remix) – 4:05
4. "Tonight" (Accapella) – 3:14
- US vinyl single
1. "Tonight" (Extended Mix) – 4:19
2. "Tonight" (DJ Wickel Mix) – 3:14
3. "Tonight" (O.M.O. Remix) – 4:05
4. "Tonight" (Dance Movement Remix) – 5:04
5. "Tonight" (Free Heads Club Mix) – 4:47
6. "Tonight" (Accapella) – 3:31

- Music and lyrics: Toni Cottura, Stephan Browarczyk, Shahin Moshirian, Christoph Brüx, N.C. Thanh, Vick Krishna, Craig Smart
