= Crown Tavern =

Pub in Scarborough, North Yorkshire, England

Coordinates: 54.2769°N 0.4189°W

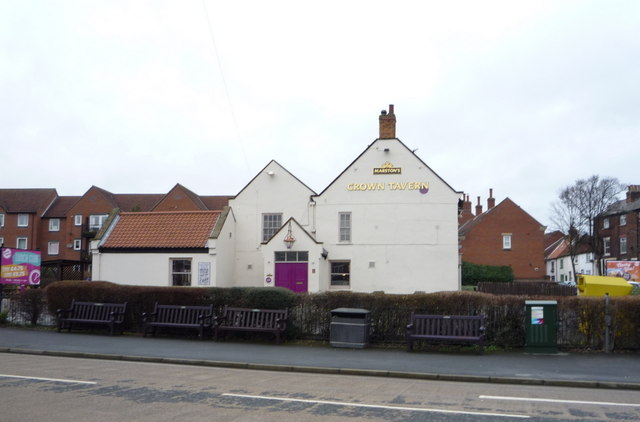
The building, in 2016

The Crown Tavern is a historic pub in Scarborough, North Yorkshire, a town in England.

The pub, on Scalby Road, was built in the late 18th century. It was grade II listed in 1953. As of 2022, it was owned by Marston's plc.

The public house is in stuccoed dark red brick, and it has a pantile roof. There are two storeys and three bays. The central doorway has fluted Greek Doric columns, a two-pane fanlight, and an entablature. The windows are sashes in architraves, with keystones.

== See also ==
- Listed buildings in Scarborough (Stepney Ward)
