= Headbone Connected =

"Headbone Connected (Try Me)"

Single by Daisy Dee
- B-side: "Remix"
- Released: November 1994
- Genre: Eurodance
- Length: 3:42
- Producers: Daniele Davoli; Mirko Limoni; Valerio Semplici

Daisy Dee singles chronology
"Dance (If You Cannot)" (1994)	"Headbone Connected (Try Me)" (1994)	"Somebody Real" (1995)

"Headbone Connected (Try Me)" is a song recorded by Dutch eurodance artist Daisy Dee. It was released in November 1994 as a single. A CD maxi with new remixes was also available, but it was marketed at the same time as the other media. The song was a hit in Canada, where it topped the RPM Dance Chart for 2 weeks in mid-1995.

== Track listings ==
CD Maxi-single (Europe, 1995)

1. "Headbone Connected (Try Me)" (Euro Radio) - 3:42
2. "Headbone Connected (Try Me)" (Euro Mix) - 5:38
3. "Headbone Connected (Try Me)" (Pegasus Vocal Mix) - 5:52
4. "Headbone Connected (Try Me)" (Pegasus Dub) - 5:03
5. "Headbone Connected (Try Me)" (Miami By Night Mix) - 6:01
6. "Headbone Connected (Try Me)" (Miami 5 A.M. Mix) - 5:48
7. "Headbone Connected (Try Me)" (Ocean Drive Dub) - 6:20
8. "Headbone Connected (Try Me)" (Piano Mix) - 5:56
9. "Headbone Connected (Try Me)" (Dub Part 1 & 2) - 8:23

== Chart performance ==
Chart (1995)	Peak positions
Canada Dance (RPM)	1

== See also ==
"Dem Bones" or "Dry Bones", the spiritual that presumably inspired the title lyric.
