= Love Religion =

1994 single by U96

Single by U96

from the album Club Bizarre
- Released: 14 October 1994
- Genre: Eurodance; techno-pop
- Length: 3:35
- Label: Guppy
- Songwriters: Helmut Hoinkis; Alex Christensen; Ingo Hauss; Hayo Panarinfo
- Producers: Matiz; Alex Christensen

U96 singles chronology
"Inside Your Dreams" (1994)	"Love Religion" (1994)	"Club Bizarre" (1995)

Music video
- "Love Religion" on YouTube

"Love Religion" is a song recorded by German dance music act U96, released by Guppy label in October 1994, as the lead single from the act's third album, Club Bizarre (1995). Unlike their previous songs, "Love Religion" is more trance-oriented techno and pop. It was co-written and co-produced by Alex Christensen and takes its main melody from Giorgio Moroder's 1978 instrumental "The Chase". The background vocals are performed by Dutch singer, actress and TV host Daisy Dee. The single peaked at number two in Finland and Sweden, and was also a top-10 hit in Austria, Denmark, Germany, the Netherlands and Switzerland. The accompanying music video for the song was directed by Nico Beyer and filmed in Hamburg and Paris.

== Critical reception ==
Maria Jimenez from pan-European magazine Music & Media complimented the song as "tasty" and "uptempo", adding, "'Love Religion', from Germany's U96 and Holland's Daisy Dee, is a new easily-accessible techno pop track. It comes complete with a bold trancey breakneck Perplexer remix."

== Chart performance ==
"Love Religion" was quite successful on the charts in Europe and remains one of U96's most successful songs. It reached number two in both Finland and Sweden, being held off reaching the top spot by "Old Pop in an Oak" by Rednex and "Stay Another Day" by East 17. In Finland, it spent two weeks as number two and further five weeks within the top 10. The single also entered the top 10 in Austria (7), Denmark (9), Germany (5), the Netherlands (9) and Switzerland (10). Additionally, "Love Religion" was a top-20 hit in France (15) and a top-30 hit in Belgium (27 and 23 in Flanders and Wallonia).

In the UK, it charted outside the UK Top 100, peaking at number 134, but it was a UK club hit. On the Eurochart Hot 100, the single peaked at number 12 in December 1994, after five weeks on the chart. On the European Dance Radio Chart, it peaked at number four in January following year, becoming the fourth most-played dance song on European radio that week. Outside Europe, "Love Religion" charted in West Asia, where it became a top-20 hit also in Israel, peaking at number 16 on 10 January 1995. In Australia, it only reached number 206. The single was awarded with a gold record in Germany, after 250,000 units were sold there.

== Music video ==
The music video for "Love Religion" was directed by German film director and producer Nico Beyer and filmed in Hamburg, Germany and Paris, France. It features Dutch singer, actress and TV host Daisy Dee performing on wide billboards at different sites in an urban city setting. She is dressed in a long, black bondage-oriented dress, performing towards a metallic wall in the background. These kind of outfits were popular in German music videos at the time, as in "Flying High" by Captain Hollywood Project and "Be My Lover" by La Bouche. Dee also wears long black gloves and her arms are chained to the ceiling, while she performs. In between, female dancers performs, wearing all kind of bondage- and fetish-oriented outfits. Frontman and producer of U96, Alex Christensen, appears in both the beginning and end of the video. Patrick Duroux was responsible for the camera and the video was produced by Chopstick Films. "Love Religion" was A-listed on German music television channel VIVA in November 1994. In February 1995, the video received active rotation on MTV Europe and was B-listed on France's MCM.

== Track listings ==
- 12-inch maxi
1. "Love Religion" (E-vangelista Mix) – 6:57
2. "Love Religion" (Instrumental) – 6:57
3. "Love Religion" (Vaticano Mix) – 4:05
- CD single
1. "Love Religion" (Video Edit) – 3:35
2. "Love Religion" (E-vangelista Mix) – 6:57
- CD maxi
1. "Love Religion" (Video Edit) – 3:35
2. "Love Religion" (E-vangelista Mix) – 6:57
3. "Love Religion" (Vaticano Mix) – 4:05
4. "Love Religion" (Instrumental) – 6:57
- CD maxi – UK
1. "Love Religion" (Video Verses Mix) – 3:35
2. "Love Religion" (E-vangelista Mix) – 6:57
3. "Love Religion" (Vaticano Mix) – 5:44
4. "Love Religion" (Instrumental) – 6:57
5. "Love Religion" ("Go Berserk" Mix) – 3:35
- CD maxi – Remixes; 12-inch maxi – Remixes
1. "Love Religion" (Perplexer Remix) – 5:24
2. "Love Religion" (Steve Baltes Remix) – 5:28
3. "Love Religion" (Exit EEE & Mr Moto Remix) – 6:11
4. "Love Religion" (Damage Control Remix) – 5:30
5. "Love Religion" (Yentz Highlight's Mix) – 6:59

== Charts ==
=== Weekly charts ===
Original version

Chart (1994–1995)	Peak position
Australia (ARIA)	206
Austria (Ö3 Austria Top 40)	7
Belgium (Ultratop 50 Flanders)	27
Belgium (Ultratop 50 Wallonia)	23
Denmark (IFPI)	9
Europe (Eurochart Hot 100)	12
Europe (European Dance Radio)	4
Finland (Suomen virallinen lista)	2
France (SNEP)	15
Germany (Media Control Charts)	5
Israel (Israeli Singles Chart)	16
Netherlands (Dutch Top 40)	9
Netherlands (Single Top 100)	10
Sweden (Sverigetopplistan)	2
Switzerland (Schweizer Hitparade)	10
UK Singles (OCC)	134
UK Club Chart (Music Week)	67

Remix

Chart (1995)	Peak position
Sweden (Sverigetopplistan)	7

=== Year-end charts ===
Original version

Chart (1994)	Position
Sweden (Topplistan)	67

Chart (1995)	Position
Belgium (Ultratop 50 Wallonia)	70
Europe (Eurochart Hot 100)	80
Netherlands (Dutch Top 40)	63
Sweden (Topplistan)	45

== Certifications ==
Region	Certification	Certified units/sales
Germany (BVMI)	Gold	250,000^{^}
^{^} Shipments figures based on certification alone.
