= Heaven (U96 song) =

1996 single by U96

Single by U96

from the album Heaven
- Released: 22 April 1996
- Length: 3:36
- Label: Guppy
- Songwriters: Cyndi Lauper; Helmut Hoinkis; Alex Christensen; Ingo Hauss; Hayo Panarinfo
- Producers: Matiz; Alex Christensen

U96 singles chronology
"Club Bizarre" (1995)	"Heaven" (1996)	"A Night to Remember" (1996)

Music video
- "Heaven" on YouTube

"Heaven" is a song recorded by German dance act U96, released in April 1996, by label Guppy, as the lead single from their fourth album by the same name (1996). The song became a top-10 hit in Austria, Finland, Germany, Hungary, Norway and Sweden. The vocals are sung by Nicole Yarling and the song's chorus interpolates Cyndi Lauper's song "Time After Time" from 1984, in which she was given a writing credit. The accompanying music video was directed by Paul Morgans, who had previously directed the video for the act's hit single "Club Bizarre" in 1995.

== Chart performance ==
"Heaven" was successful on the charts all over Europe, becoming a top-10 hit in Austria (number two), Finland, Germany, Hungary, Norway and Sweden. Additionally, the single peaked within the top 20 in Denmark, the Netherlands and Switzerland, as well as on the Eurochart Hot 100, where it hit number 11 in its eighth week on the chart, in July 1996. In the United Kingdom, "Heaven" was U96's last single to chart there, ending up at number 87 on the UK Singles Chart, on November 24, 1996. In Scotland, it peaked at number 82. The single earned a gold record in Germany after 250.000 units were sold there.

== Track listings ==
- 12" maxi
1. "Heaven" (Prophecy Mix) — 6:07
2. "Heaven" (French Kiss Mix) — 4:54
3. "Boot II" (Volle Fahrt Voraus Mix) — 4:46
- CD single
1. "Heaven" (Video Version) — 3:36
2. "Heaven" (French Kiss Version) — 4:54
- CD maxi
1. "Heaven" (Radio Edit) — 3:36
2. "Heaven" (Klubbheads Remix) — 6:18
3. "Heaven" (Xenomania Club Mix) — 7:30
4. "Heaven" (George Morel Mix) — 6:49
5. "Heaven" (Prophecy Mix) — 6:07
6. "Heaven" (French Kiss Mix) — 4:54
- CD maxi - Remixes
1. "Heaven" (DB 600 Remix) — 7:30
2. "Heaven" (Raver's Nature Remix) — 5:52
3. "Heaven" (George Morel Remix) — 6:49

== Charts ==
=== Weekly charts ===
Chart (1996)	Peak position
Austria (Ö3 Austria Top 40)	2
Denmark (IFPI)	11
Europe (Eurochart Hot 100)	11
Europe (European Dance Radio)	16
Finland (Suomen virallinen lista)	7
Germany (GfK)	4
Hungary (Mahasz)	9
Netherlands (Dutch Top 40)	15
Netherlands (Single Top 100)	15
Norway (VG-lista)	5
Scotland Singles (OCC)	82
Sweden (Sverigetopplistan)	5
Switzerland (Schweizer Hitparade)	16
UK Singles (OCC)	87
UK Pop Tip Club Chart (Music Week)	6

=== Year-end charts ===
Chart (1996)	Position
Austria (Ö3 Austria Top 40)	15
Europe (Eurochart Hot 100)	69
Germany (Media Control)	21
Sweden (Topplistan)	20

== Certifications ==
Region	Certification	Certified units/sales
Germany (BVMI)	Gold	250,000^{^}
^{^} Shipments figures based on certification alone.
