= Listed buildings in Scarborough (Stepney Ward) =

Stepney Ward is a ward in the town of Scarborough, North Yorkshire, England. It contains 16 listed buildings that are recorded in the National Heritage List for England. All the listed buildings are designated at Grade II, the lowest of the three grades, which is applied to "buildings of national importance and special interest". The parish is to the southwest of the centre of the town, and is mainly residential. Most of the listed buildings are houses, some in terraces, with associated structures, and the others are four public houses.

== Buildings ==
Name and location	Photograph	Date	Notes
The Crown Tavern; 54.27699°N 0.41890°W		Late 18th century	The public house is in stuccoed dark red brick, and it has a pantile roof. There are two storeys and three bays. The central doorway has fluted Greek Doric columns, a two-pane fanlight, and an entablature. The windows are sashes in architraves, with keystones.
The New Tavern; 54.27684°N 0.41576°W		c. 1800	The public house is in stuccoed brick, with an eaves band and a pantile roof. There are two storeys and three bays. The central doorway has fluted pilasters, a four-pane oblong fanlight, urns in roundels in the broken entablature, and an open moulded pediment. The windows are sashes with keystones, those on the upper floor are paired.
The Tap & Spile Public House; 54.27657°N 0.41484°W		c. 1800	Formerly The White House public house, it is in stuccoed red brick, with an eaves band and a pantile roof. There are two storeys, three bays and an extension on the right with a lean-to roof. The central doorway has fluted pilasters, a blind semicircular fanlight with a reed arch on imposts, a broken entablature with urns, and an open moulded pediment.
69 Falsgrave Road; 54.27755°N 0.41207°W	—	c. 1830	The house is in dark red brick on a plinth, with a sill course, a shallow eaves cornice and a slate roof. There are two storeys and an attic, and three bays. The central doorway has fluted Greek Doric columns, an architrave, an oblong fanlight, an entablature, and a triglyph frieze. The windows are recessed sashes, the window above the doorway with an architrave and a cornice, and the others have flat stone arches with keystones.
14 Falsgrave Road; 54.27764°N 0.41081°W	—	c. 1830–40	A house, later an office, in painted brick on a plinth, with a slate roof. There are two storeys and two bays. The left bay contains a doorway with Greek Doric columns, an entablature, and a projecting moulded cornice, above which is a sash window. On the right bay is a two-storey segmental bow window, with a moulded flat eaves cornice.
20 Falsgrave Road; 54.27758°N 0.41104°W	—	c. 1830–40	A house in painted brick with a slate roof. There are two storeys and a basement, and two bays Steps with railings lead up to the doorway in the left bay that has Greek Doric columns, an entablature, and a projecting moulded cornice, above which is a sash window. On the right bay is a full-height segmental bow window, with a moulded flat eaves cornice.
29–45 Falsgrave Road; 54.27806°N 0.41069°W		c. 1830–40	A terrace of houses in dark red brick, with three storeys, and each house has two bays. On the right bay is a Greek Doric doorway with a triglyph frieze and a cornice, and above it are sash windows. The left bay contains a three-storey segmental bow window with a flat moulded eaves cornice and a frieze.
47–55 Falsgrave Road; 54.27785°N 0.41121°W		c. 1830–40	A terrace of five houses in red brick on a stone plinth, one stuccoed, with a slate roof. There are two storeys, and each house has two bays. The right bay contains a doorway with panelled pilasters, an oblong two-pane fanlight and an entablature, above which is a sash window with a flat stucco arch. On the left bay is a two-storey segmental bow window with a flat moulded eaves cornice.
57–61 Falsgrave Road; 54.27774°N 0.41148°W	—	c. 1830–40	A row of three red brick houses, the left two painted, with two storeys and basements and two bays each. The right bay contains a doorway with panelled pilasters, an oblong two-pane fanlight and an entablature, above which is a sash window with a flat stucco arch. On the left bay is a full height segmental bow window with flat eaves and a frieze.
63–67 Falsgrave Road; 54.27767°N 0.41165°W	—	c. 1830–40	A row of three red brick houses, the left two painted, with a slate roof. There are two storeys and basements, and each house has two bays. The right bay contains a doorway with panelled pilasters, an oblong two-pane fanlight and an entablature. On the left bay is a segmental bow window on the ground floor and basement, with a shallow projecting moulded cornice. The upper floor contains sash windows.
11–19 Scalby Road; 54.27745°N 0.41878°W		Late 18th to early 19th century	A row of roughcast and rendered cottages with pantile roofs and two storeys. The doorways are under segmental arches, and the windows vary; there is one shop window, and the others are casements or sashes.
12–16 Scalby Road; 54.27743°N 0.41912°W	—	18th to 19th century	A row of three cottages in roughcast stone with pantile roofs. The windows are sashes, some horizontally sliding., and over all the openings are lintels with keystones.
The Ship Public House; 54.27747°N 0.41239°W		18th to 19th century	The public house is in painted dark red brick, with a coved stuccoed eaves frieze and a slate roof. There are two storeys and three bays. The ground floor contains canted bay windows flanking the doorway, with a roof carried across them, and to the right is a garage door. Above the doorway is a casement window, the other windows on the upper floor are tripartite sashes in architraves, and above are two dormers.
73 Falsgrave Road; 54.27743°N 0.41253°W	—	Early 19th century	A cottage in rendered brick with a pantile roof. There are two storeys and two bays. The doorway on the right has an oblong fanlight, and the windows are sashes in moulded frames.
5–9 Scalby Road; 54.27736°N 0.41867°W	—	Early 19th century	A row of three houses in red brick with some grey headers, partly stuccoed, with a moulded cornice, an eaves board, and a slate roof. There are three storeys and four bays. The doorways have oblong fanlights, there is a passage doorway, most of the windows are recessed sashes and the openings have flat stucco arches.
Front walls, 29–45 Falsgrave Road; 54.27789°N 0.41080°W	—	Undated	Dwarf stone walls line the pavement in front of the houses.
