= Daisy Dee =

Dutch singer and actress (born 1970)

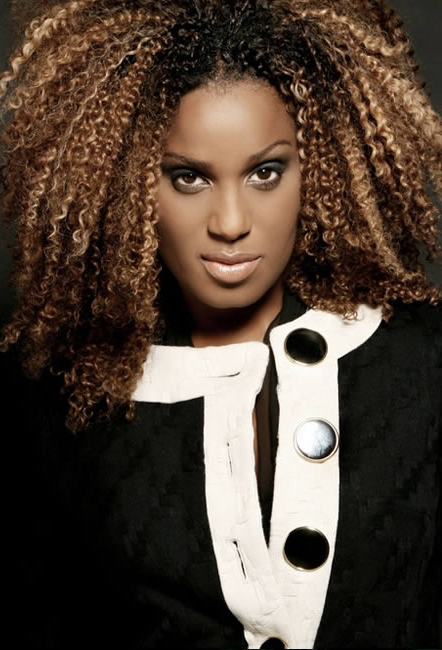
- Daisy Dee in 2023

Background information
- Born: Desiree Rollocks; 4 September 1970 (age 55); Curaçao, Netherlands Antilles
- Origin: Roermond, Netherlands
- Genres: Eurodance; hip house; electronica
- Occupations: Singer; actress; television host; fashion stylist; producer
- Instrument: Vocals
- Years active: 1990–present
- Label: DDProductions
- Website: ddproductions.eu

Desiree Rollocks (born 4 September 1970), better known by her stage name Daisy Dee, is a Dutch singer, actress, TV host, stylist, and television producer. She hosted the German television show Club Rotation on Viva/MTV until 2003.

== Discography ==
=== Studio albums ===
Year	Album	Details
1991	Daisy Dee	Release date: 1991; Label: LMR; Formats: CD
1994	Destination of Love (The Daisy Project featuring Daisy Dee)	Release date: 1994; Label: BMG; Formats: CD
1994	Lover's Reggae (Reggae Roots featuring Daisy Dee)	Release date: 1994; Label: Mercury; Formats: CD
1996	I Am (Who I Am)	Release date: 1996; Label: Edel; Formats: CD

=== Singles ===
Year	Single	Peak chart positions								Album
Year	Single	AUS	AUT	CAN Dance	GER	NLD	SWI	US	US Dance	Album
1990	"It's Gonna Be Alright"	—	—	—	—	—	—	—	—	Daisy Dee
1990	"Crazy" (featuring MC B.)	156	—	—	—	29	—	73	10	Daisy Dee
1991	"I Got U"	—	—	—	—	—	—	—	—	Daisy Dee
1992	"Walking On That Side"	—	—	—	—	—	—	—	—	Daisy Dee
1992	"Pump It Up All the Way"	—	—	—	—	—	—	—	—	Daisy Dee
1994	"Headbone Connected (Try Me)"	—	—	1	—	—	—	—	—	Non-album single
1996	"Angel"	—	—	4	—	—	—	—	—	I Am (Who I Am)
1996	"Just Jump"	127	—	—	88	—	—	—	—	I Am (Who I Am)
1996	"Crazy ('96 Mix)"	38	—	—	—	—	—	—	—	non-album singles
1997	"Hey You (Open Up Your Mind)" (feat. Toni Cottura)	—	—	—	—	—	—	—	—	non-album singles
2000	"Open Sesame"	—	—	—	78	—	—	—	—	non-album singles
"—" denotes single that did not chart

=== As featured artist ===
Year	Single	Peak chart positions						Album
Year	Single	AUS	AUT	CAN Dance	GER	NLD	SWI	Album
1990	"This Beat Is Technotronic" (MC B. featuring Daisy Dee)	—	11	—	14	18	—	non-album singles
1992	"This Beat Is Technotronic ('92 Mix)" (MC B. featuring Daisy Dee)	—	—	—	—	—	—	non-album singles
1993	"Do It Better" (The Daisy Project featuring Daisy Dee)	—	—	—	—	—	—	Destination of Love
1993	"Back It Up" (Cosmo Crew featuring Daisy Dee)	—	—	—	—	—	—	non-album singles
1994	"Yeah Yeah (Influence)" (Black Male featuring Daisy Dee)	—	—	—	—	—	—	non-album singles
1994	"Dance (If You Cannot)" (Alter Ego featuring Daisy Dee)	—	—	3	—	—	—	non-album singles
1994	"Love Religion" (U96 featuring Daisy Dee)	—	7	—	5	10	10	Club Bizarre
1995	"Somebody Real" (Bit Machine featuring Daisy Dee)	—	—	—	—	17	—	non-album singles
1996	"Vamonos (Hey Chico Are You Ready)" (Garcia featuring Daisy Dee)	—	—	—	4	—	—	non-album singles
1996	"Te Quiero, Latina" (Garcia featuring Daisy Dee)	—	—	—	—	—	—	non-album singles
2000	"Love is the Answer" (Mark 'Oh featuring Daisy Dee)	101	—	—	51	—	88	non-album singles
2003	"Fly Away (Owner of Your Heart)" (Starsplash featuring Daisy Dee)	—	43	—	24	—	—	non-album singles
"—" denotes single that did not chart
