= Christoph Brüx =

German artist & musician (born 1965)

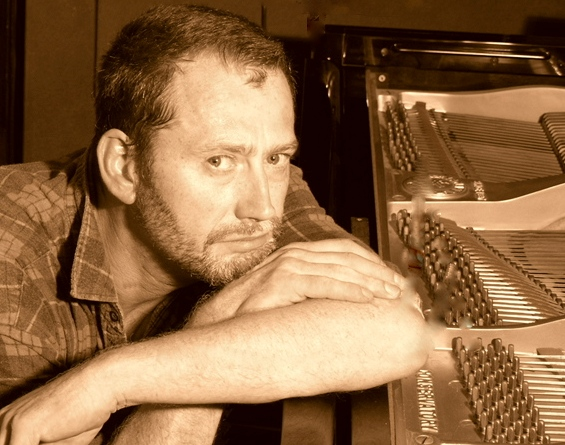
- The German painter, sculptor, musician in his studio

Background information
- Born: Christoph Brüx; 13 December 1965 (age 60); Sonsbeck, North Rhine-Westphalia, West Germany
- Origin: Hamburg (Germany)
- Genres: Eurodance, Pop music, House, Lounge, Chill-out music, Film score a.o.
- Occupations: Sculptor, painter, composer, music producer, arranger, audio-designer, keyboardist, filmmaker (under water)
- Instruments: Piano, keyboard, synthesizer, accordion
- Years active: 1985–present
- Website: dolphin-sound.com

Christoph Brüx (born 13 December 1965) is a German sculptor, painter, composer, pianist, keyboardist, arranger and music producer.

He composed for artists such as No Angels, Matthias Reim, The Underdog Project (Summer Jam), Brooklyn Bounce etc., and he also composed film scores.

== Biography ==
Brüx was born in Sonsbeck (North Rhine-Westphalia). Until 1985 he went to school (Städtisches Stiftsgymnasium Xanten). Following his talent in music, he early began taking piano lessons and later he graduated at a music conservatoire.
Brüx was composing for several interpreters such as:

- Bro'Sis: whose first album Never Forget (Where You Come From), which Brüx took part in, has been released to the public in January 2002, scored in Germany platinum.
- No Angels: the album Pure where he took part in, rose to No. 1 in the German album charts and No. 3 and No. 9 in Austria and Switzerland.

He wrote music for several films (also industry and corporate videos):

- TKKG – Der Club der Detektive was nominated in 2007 for the attendance at the German children media festival Goldener Spatz.

Already in the youth his sensitivity showed up in relation to its environment. His large respect for nature particularly to results in his touching underwater video "Niklas' Theme".

Today Brüx is working and living in Hamburg, Germany, where he in his studio besides music even with the visual arts (painting, sculpture) engaged.

== Projects ==
=== Sculptures and paintings ===
Untitled

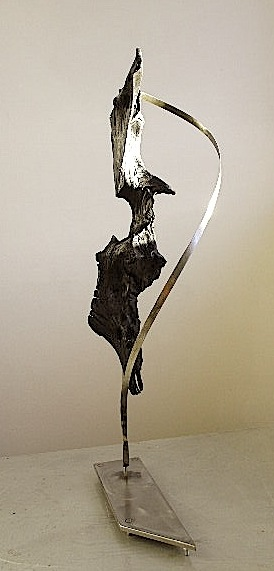

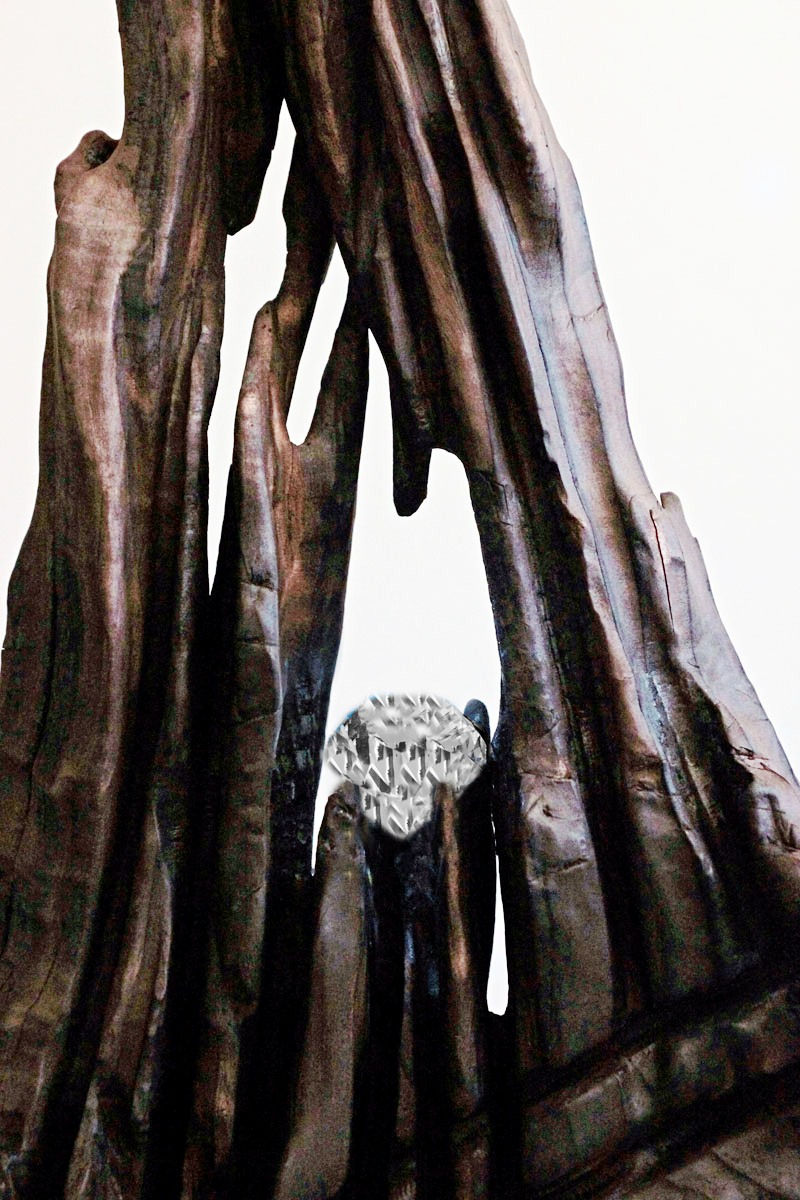

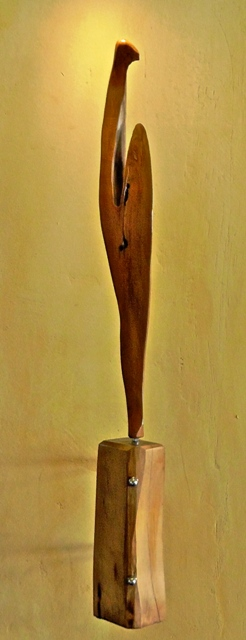

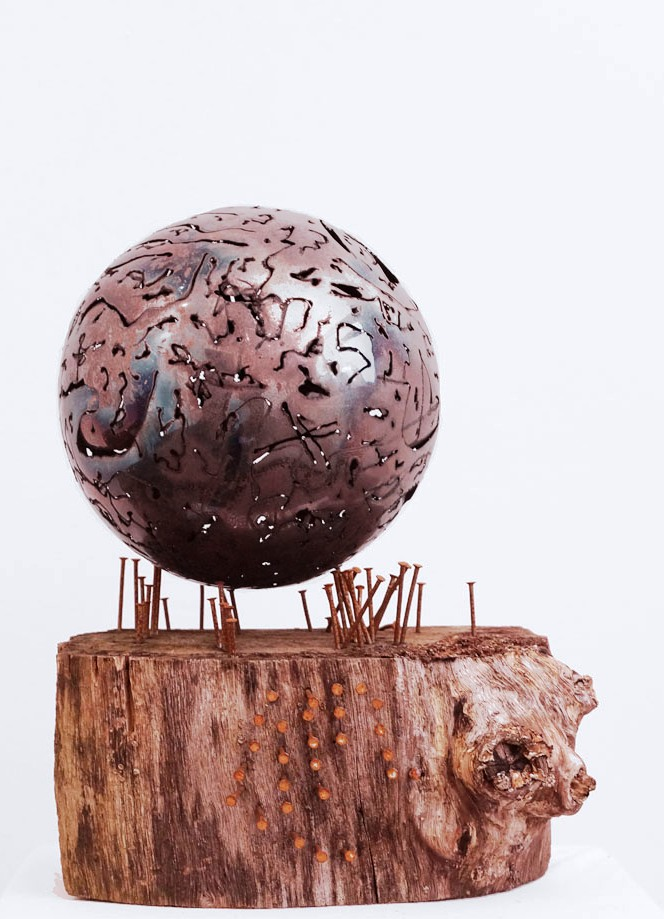

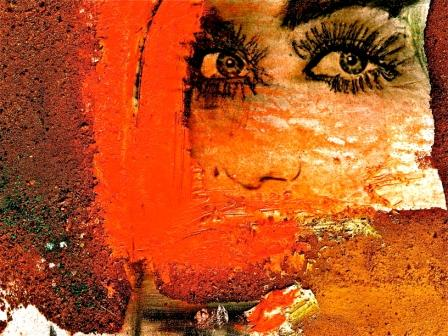

=== Bands ===
- SMC Unity

Members: Sofie St. Claire, Matthias Menck, Christoph Brüx

- Dolphin Sound

Members: Christoph Brüx, Matthias Menck

=== Discography ===
Year	Artist	Title
1993	SMC Unity	Move'n Groove
1994	SMC Unity	Make It Happen
1995	Matthias Reim	Tina geht tanzen (Anti-drugs-song)
1995	Matthias Reim	Ist das Liebe?
1995	Matthias Reim	Alles klar
1996	Dolphin Sound	The Circle
1997	Matthias Reim	Wenn du gehen willst, must du gehen
1997	Matthias Reim	Das erste Mal
1998	Sweet Sour	Pick a Number
2000	The Underdog Project	Tonight
2001	Double M.	Featuring Sophie* – Friday Nite
2001	Brooklyn Bounce	Born to Bounce (Music Is My Destiny)
2002	Bro'Sis	All I Wanna Know
2002	Bro'Sis	Let Me Know
2002	The Underdog Project	I Can't Handle It (Alex K Mix)
2003	The Underdog Project	Winter Jam
2003	Vanessa S	Shining
2003	No Angels	Angel of Mine
2004	Novastar (2)	Summer Jam
2005	18auf12 feat. Gary Krosnoff	Back to St. Pauli
2006	Tony Cook & The Trunk-O-Funk	Cash Advance
2007	Alex Prinz u.a.	Try to write a lovesong (Ambient)
2010	18auf12 100 years FC St. Pauli	One Hundred Beers

=== Filmography ===
- Für die Familie (For the family) (short-movie) (Germany 2004)
- Alina (Alina) (TV-series) (Germany 2005)
- Alinas Traum (Alinas dream) (TV-movie) (Germany 2005)

=== Others ===
- CD: MENTAL STRATEGIES for your SUCCESS
- Synth Power SM-MOT-02 (Yamaha SmartMedia card for Synthesizer of the Yamaha Motif-series)

== Associated acts ==
- No Angels
- Matthias Reim
- Bro'Sis
- The Underdog Project
- Brooklyn Bounce
- Vanessa S
- Anke Engelke
- Marc et Claude
- Double M
- Kool & The Gang
- Matthias Menck (Double M.)
- Thomas Hettwer
- Tina Turner
- Niklas Schmidt
- David Hasselhoff
- Bonnie Tyler
- Blümchen
- Reinhard Fendrich
- Anna David
- Tony Cook
- Moloko
- Al Jarreau

== See also ==
- List of music arrangers
