= Das Boot (album) =

Studio album by U96
- Released: 1992
- Genre: Techno, rave
- Length: 41:40
- Label: Cohiba; Polydor
- Producer: Matiz / AC 16

Das Boot (German for "The Boat") is the first album by German dance group U96, released in 1992. The track "Das Boot" is a cover version of the title theme of the 1981 German film Das Boot, composed by Klaus Doldinger. The name of the group (U96) is a reference to the film.

== Track listing ==
=== 1992 release: Polydor / 513 185-1 ===
1. "Das Boot" – 5:14
2. "Come 2 Gether" – 3:49
3. "Der Kommandant" – 3:12
4. "Art of U96" – 4:30
5. "I Wanna Be a Kennedy" – 5:31
6. "Ambient Underworld" – 3:51
7. "Sporty Animal-Loving Extrovert" – 3:00
8. "Sonar Sequences" – 6:00
9. "Bonus Track, Das Boot (Klassik Version) – 1:59

=== 1992 release: Polydor / 513 185-2 ===
1. "Das Boot" – 5:14
2. "Come 2 Gether" – 3:49
3. "Der Kommandant" – 3:12
4. "No Control" - 4:30
5. "Art of U96" – 4:14
6. "I Wanna Be a Kennedy" – 5:31
7. "Ambient Underworld" – 3:51
8. "Sporty Animal-Loving Extrovert" – 3:00
9. "Sonar Sequences" – 6:00
10. "Bonus Track, Das Boot (Klassik Version) – 1:59

== Charts ==
=== Weekly charts ===
Chart (1992)	Peak position
Austrian Albums (Ö3 Austria)	5
German Albums (Offizielle Top 100)	11
Hungarian Albums (MAHASZ)	40
Swedish Albums (Sverigetopplistan)	26
Swiss Albums (Schweizer Hitparade)	9

=== Year-end charts ===
Chart (1992)	Position
Austrian Albums (Ö3 Austria)	29
German Albums (Offizielle Top 100)	68

== See also ==
- Das Boot (novel), a novel by Lothar-Günther Buchheim from 1973
- Das Boot (TV series), a German television series sequel to the 1981 film
- Das Boot (video game), a 1991 video game inspired by the novel of the same name
