= The Music's Got Me! =

Single by Bass Bumpers

from the album Advance
- Released: 1992; 1994 (re-release)
- Genre: Eurodance; Euro-house
- Length: 4:04
- Label: Dance Street
- Songwriters: Caba Kroll; Henning Reith
- Producers: Caba Kroll; Henning Reith

Bass Bumpers singles chronology
| "Get the Big Bass" (1991) | "The Music's Got Me!" (1992) | "Good Fun" (1994) |

"The Music's Got Me!" is a song by German DJ and record production team Bass Bumpers, released in 1992 by label Dance Street Records as the third single from their debut album, Advance (1992). It was both written and produced by Caba Kroll and Henning Reith, featuring vocals by Felicia Uwaje and rap by E-Mello. As the team's first European success, the song became a top-10 hit in Spain and a top-20 hit in France as well as a hit on the club charts. When re-released with new mixes in late 1993, it peaked at number 25 on the UK Singles Chart, while reaching numbers four and one on the Music Week Dance Singles chart and the Record Mirror Club Chart. In the US, it peaked at number 36 on the Billboard Hot Dance Club Play chart. In 2015, Bass Bumpers released the song with new mixes from North2South, La Chord, and Taito Tikaro.

== Critical reception ==
Andy Beevers from Music Week gave the song four out of five, writing, "Currently residing at the top of the Club Chart, this is a sharply-produced piece of upbeat Euro-house from Germany. It comes with catchy radio-friendly versions plus harder club mixes, including some new ones from Paul Gotel. Definitely one to watch." Machgiel Bakker from Music & Media noted that the success of Bass Bumpers "adds another chapter to the on-going conquest of a German dance wave that has produced such reliable hitmakers as Captain Hollywood Project, Culture Beat, Haddaway, Enigma and Snap."

Brad Beatnik from the Record Mirror Dance Update commented, "You know the score—Euro vocals and tune just the right side of tacky and a deliriously happy house beat—yup, Bass Bumpers have done it again. As well as the original though, there's some cracking funky vocal, dub and deeper trance mixes from Paul Gotel that replace any cheesey-ness with respectable and more imaginative house grooves. A doublepack that should do the business for everyone." Record Mirror columnist James Hamilton named it a "typical repetitive girl and cheesy rap prodded German romper" in his weekly dance column.

== Track listing ==
- 7-inch, Netherlands (1992)
1. "The Music's Got Me" (Radio Version) — 4:04
2. "The Music's Got Me" (Charismatic Mix) — 4:04
- 12-inch, Europe (1992)
1. "The Music's Got Me" (Charismatic Mix) — 6:25
2. "The Music's Got Me" (Dread Mix) — 6:10
3. "Touch Me" (Factory Dub) — 6:28
- CD maxi, France (1992)
1. "The Music's Got Me" (Radio Version N°1) — 4:05
2. "The Music's Got Me" (Radio Version N°2) — 4:14
3. "The Music's Got Me" (Charismatic Mix) — 6:30
4. "The Music's Got Me" (Dread Mix) — 4:16
- CD single, UK & Europe (1993)
1. "The Music's Got Me" (Paul Gotel's Banged Up Radio Edit) — 3:40
2. "The Music's Got Me" (Megabump Original) — 5:52
3. "The Music's Got Me" (Rammel Mix) — 6:15
4. "The Music's Got Me" (Paul Gotel's Banged Up Mix) — 6:56
- CD maxi-single (The Paul Gotel Mixes), Germany (1994)
1. "The Music's Got Me" (Paul Gotel's Banged Up Mix) — 6:55
2. "The Music's Got Me" (Obsessive Mix) — 6:54
3. "The Music's Got Me" (Charismatic Mix) — 6:24
4. "The Music's Got Me" (RZ's Rammel Mix) — 6:15
- CD maxi-single ('96 Remixes), Germany (1996)
1. "The Music's Got Me" (Radio Edit) — 3:45
2. "The Music's Got Me" (Club Mix) — 6:10
3. "The Music's Got Me" (Ltd. Express Remix) — 5:31
4. "Come Together" — 5:00
- CD maxi-single ('97 Remixes), Australia & New Zealand (1997)
1. "The Music's Got Me '97 Remix" (Radio Edit) — 3:46
2. "The Music's Got Me '97 Remix" (Club Mix) — 6:10
3. "The Music's Got Me '97 Remix" (LTD Express Remix) — 5:31
4. "The Music's Got Me" (Paul Gotel Mix) (Banged Up Radio Mix) — 3:40
5. "The Music's Got Me" (Original) (Charismatic Mix) — 6:24
6. "Come Together" — 5:00

== Charts ==
Weekly chart performance for "The Music's Got Me"
| Chart (1992–1994) | Peak position |
|---|---|
| Australia (ARIA) | 179 |
| Europe (European Hot 100) | 66 |
| France (SNEP) | 16 |
| Spain (AFYVE) | 10 |
| UK Singles (OCC) | 25 |
| UK Dance (Music Week) | 4 |
| UK Club Chart (Music Week) | 1 |
| US Hot Dance Club Play (Billboard) | 36 |
