= U96 =

German Eurodance project

- Origin: Hamburg, Germany
- Genres: Eurodance; techno
- Years active: 1991–present
- Labels: Cohiba; Polydor
- Members: Hayo Lewerentz
- Past members: Ingo Hauss; Alex Christensen; Stefan Hafelinger; Helmut Hoinkis; Skadi Lange; Dorothy Lapi
- Website: u96-official.com

U96 is a German musical project formed by DJ and producer Alex Christensen, and a team of producers named Matiz (Ingo Hauss, Helmut Hoinkis, and Hayo Lewerentz). After a decade-long hiatus, the band returned in 2018 without Christensen and Hoinkis.

== History ==
=== Das Boot: 1991–1992 ===
The name of the project comes from the film Das Boot about German submarine U-96 from World War II. The project's first hit, "Das Boot" (1991), is a techno adaptation of the film's title melody, which had been originally composed by Klaus Doldinger. An album of the same name was also released.

=== Replugged: 1993 ===
The band's next album, Replugged (1993), was inspired by the electro sounds of the 1980s and by ambient and disco music themes. It was less commercially successful than its predecessor, but achieved three top-10 hits: "Love Sees No Colour", "Night in Motion", and "Inside Your Dreams", which peaked at number 1 in Finland. Although uncredited, Ingo Hauss provided most male vocals for this album.

=== Club Bizarre: 1994–1995 ===
The follow-up album, Club Bizarre (1995), radically changed the group's sound. It was dominated by a fast-paced Eurodance sound with a significant rave influence. The hit single releases from this album were "Love Religion" (with Daisy Dee) as well as the title track "Club Bizarre", with harmonies that were reused later by Brooklyn Bounce. Motor Music also released the Club Bizarre Interactive CD-ROM. The audio part of this CD included several music tracks and the multimedia part featured a discography, interviews with Alex Christensen, and a game for Mac OS and Windows PC.

=== Heaven: 1996 ===
In 1996, U96's fourth album, Heaven, was released. It was highly commercial in sound, with greater emphasis on Eurodance, despite retaining some electro and rave influences. On this album, a new singer, Dea-Li (Dorothy Lapi), was featured, who participated in the production of four titles. The chorus in the song "Heaven"—although with a faster pace and different text—closely resembles Cyndi Lauper's 1984 hit "Time After Time". The second single, "A Night to Remember", was a top-20 hit in Austria and Finland. The final single, "Venus in Chains", peaked at number 7 in the Czech Republic.

=== Hiatus, Reboot: 1997–present ===
After their fourth album, the group released the singles "Seven Wonders" (1997), "Energie" (1998), "Beweg Dich, Baby" (1998), and "Das Boot 2001" (2000), before issuing the compilation Best of 1991–2001, which included a few songs from the unreleased album Rhythm of Life. They returned to the German Top 30 in 2006 with "Vorbei", which featured vocals by Ben.

Another album, Out of Wilhelmsburg, was released in 2007, albeit with a different group lineup, before the band went on an indefinite hiatus.

In June 2018, U96 came out with the double album Reboot. Two years later, in collaboration with Wolfgang Flür, they released another double album, titled Transhuman.

Helmut Hoinkis died on 19 February 2021. Ingo Hauss died on 21 October 2025. Skadi Lange's death was announced on 29 September 2026.

== Band members ==
Current

- Hayo Lewerentz (aka Harry Castioni / Hayo Panarinfo)

Past

- Ingo Hauss (aka Bela Lagonda)
- Helmut Hoinkis (aka Jeff Wycombe)
- Alex Christensen (aka AC 16, AC Beat, Alex C.)
- Stefan Hafelinger
- Skadi Lange
- Dorothy Lapi

== Discography ==
=== Albums ===
Title	Album details	Peak chart positions							Certifications
Title	Album details	GER	AUT	FIN	NED	NOR	SWE	SWI	Certifications
Das Boot	Released: March 1992; Label: Polydor; Category: Studio album	11	5	19	—	—	26	9	SWI: Gold
Replugged	Released: June 1993; Label: Urban; Category: Studio album	21	5	22	—	—	33	18	
Club Bizarre	Released: March 1995; Label: Polydor; Category: Studio album	22	23	9	24	—	19	37	
Heaven	Released: June 1996; Label: Motor Music; Category: Studio album	30	19	20	77	35	22	23	
Best of 1991–2001	Released: May 2000; Label: Urban; Category: Compilation	34	36	—	—	—	—	—	
Out of Wilhelmsburg	Released: March 2007; Label: Centaurus Records; Category: Studio album	—	—	—	—	—	—	—	
The Dark Matter	Released: 4 December 2015; Label: UNLTD Recordings; Category: EP	—	—	—	—	—	—	—	
Reboot	Released: June 2018; Label: UNLTD Recordings; Category: Studio album	—	—	—	—	—	—	—	
Transhuman	Released: September 2020; Label: UNLTD Recordings; Category: Studio album	—	—	—	—	—	—	—	
20.000 Meilen Unter dem Meer	Released: September 2022; Label: Motor Entertainment (Edel); Category: Studio album	—	—	—	—	—	—	—	
"—" denotes items that did not chart or were not released in that territory.

=== Singles ===
Year	Title	Peak chart positions										Certifications	Album
Year	Title	GER	AUT	BEL	FIN	FRA	NED	NOR	SWE	SWI	UK	Certifications	Album
1991	"Das Boot"	1	1	11	9	9	3	1	5	1	18	AUT: Gold	Das Boot
1992	"I Wanna Be a Kennedy"	4	6	—	18	9	40	—	32	3	77		Das Boot
1992	"Come 2gether/Der Kommandant"	38	—	—	9	—	—	—	—	—	—		Das Boot
1992	"Ambient Underworld"	—	—	—	—	36	—	—	—	—	—		Das Boot
1993	"Love Sees No Colour"	6	3	39	4	20	17	—	4	4	84		Replugged
1993	"Love Sees No Colour" (remix)	—	—	—	—	—	—	—	—	38	—		Replugged
1993	"Night in Motion"	9	7	50	7	29	38	—	10	18	134		Replugged
1994	"Inside Your Dreams"	12	10	—	1	—	24	—	19	9	44		Non-album single
1994	"Love Religion"	5	7	27	2	15	10	—	2	10	—	GER: Gold	Club Bizarre
1994	"Love Religion" (remix)	—	—	—	—	—	—	—	23	—	—		Club Bizarre
1995	"Club Bizarre"	19	14	37	1	44	12	—	16	32	70		Club Bizarre
1995	"Movin'"	91	—	—	3	—	—	—	—	—	—		Club Bizarre
1995	"Boot II"	—	—	—	10	—	—	—	53	—	—		Club Bizarre
1996	"Heaven"	4	2	—	7	—	15	5	5	16	87	GER: Gold	Heaven
1996	"A Night to Remember"	25	18	—	11	—	—	—	37	44	—		Heaven
1996	"Venus in Chains"	75	18	—	—	—	—	—	54	—	—		Heaven
1997	"Seven Wonders"	40	—	—	—	—	—	—	52	—	—		Non-album single
1998	"Energie"	29	—	—	—	—	—	—	—	—	—		Non-album single
1998	"Beweg dich Baby"	—	—	—	—	—	—	—	—	—	—		Non-album single
2001	"Das Boot 2001"	16	12	—	—	—	—	—	—	41	—		Non-album single
2003	"We Call It Love"	—	—	—	—	—	—	—	—	—	—		Non-album single
2006	"Vorbei" (featuring Ben)	28	—	—	—	—	—	—	—	—	—		Non-album single
2006	"Mr. DJ Put on the Red Light" (featuring Das Bo)	77	—	—	—	—	—	—	—	—	—		Non-album single
2020	"Let Yourself Go"	—	—	—	—	—	—	—	—	—	—		Non-album single
2021	"Das Boot (V2)"	—	—	—	—	—	—	—	—	—	—		Non-album single
2023	"Dance Hall Days"	—	—	—	—	—	—	—	—	—	—		Non-album single
"—" denotes items that did not chart or were not released in that territory.
