= The Ship, Scarborough =

Public house in Scarborough, North Yorkshire, England

The Ship
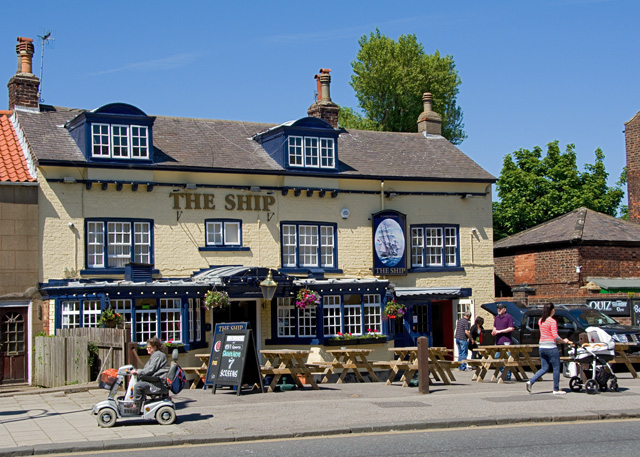
- The Ship on Falsgrave Road
- Alternative names: The Ship Inn; Old Ship Inn

General information
- Type: Public house
- Architectural style: Vernacular / Late Georgian
- Location: 71 Falsgrave Road, Falsgrave, Scarborough, North Yorkshire, England
- Coordinates: 54.27744°N 0.41235°W
- Grid position: TA 03473 88028
- Year built: 18th or early 19th century
- Renovated: 20th century; 2022–2024

Listed Building – Grade II
- Designated: 8 June 1973
- Reference no.: 1258531

The Ship (also known historically as The Ship Inn and in the mid-20th century as the Old Ship Inn) is a historic public house on Falsgrave Road in Falsgrave, a suburb of Scarborough, England. Built in the 18th or early 19th century, the building is Grade II listed and was added to the register on 8 June 1973.

== History ==
Before Falsgrave was incorporated into the borough of Scarborough in 1890, The Ship Inn stood as a prominent landmark on the western approach road into the village. According to local historical accounts recorded in Arthur Rowntree's 1931 book, The History of Scarborough, the inn served as the finishing post for annual Falsgrave sports days during the 19th century, which drew spectators from Scarborough for foot races, donkey and pony races, and greasy-pole climbing contests starting from the Scalby Road junction.

In 1863, licensee George Sedman took over the tenancy of the Ship Inn, though his licence was subsequently refused at the August 1869 Brewster Sessions over complaints regarding the conduct of the house, leading to bankruptcy proceedings in Leeds later that year. Under later 19th-century landlords such as T. Harrison and Thomas Baker, the inn functioned as a social hub for local tradesmen, hosting the annual dinner of the Falsgrave cabmen in January 1873. In March 1893, licensee Thomas Baker was brought before the Scarborough magistrates for allegedly serving rum after permitted hours, though the case was dismissed after it was shown the spirits had been supplied for an ill relative. Plans for a reconstruction and enlargement of the premises were submitted to the licensing justices in 1904.

In December 2022, the pub was reopened by former featherweight boxing champion Paul Ingle after memorabilia belonging to him was found inside by new licensees. In October 2024, the pub reopened following a major refurbishment, which included a new pool table, dartboard, HD TV screens, and an upgraded beer garden.

== Architecture ==
The building is constructed of painted dark red brick with a coved stuccoed eaves frieze and a pitched slate roof.It has two storeys, a 19th-century roof, and a 20th-century ground floor.

The three-bay front features a central doorway flanked by canted bay windows with a pentice roof, and a garage door to the right. On the upper floor, there is a central casement window above the entrance, flanked by tripartite sash windows in moulded architraves, and two dormer windows in the roof.

== See also ==
- Listed buildings in Scarborough (Stepney Ward)
