= Matthias Menck =

German audio engineer

- Also known as: Double M Toxilogic
- Born: Matthias Menck; Germany
- Origin: Hamburg, Germany
- Genres: Trance music, Electronic music a.o.
- Occupations: audio engineer, Music Producer, arranger, musician, Sound designer, DJ
- Instrument: Synthesizer,
- Years active: 1988–present
- Website: matthiasmenck.com

Matthias Menck (also known as Double M or Toxilogic) is a German audio engineer, house and trance producer and DJ. A resident of Hamburg, he is most famous for being a part of Brooklyn Bounce.

== Producer and DJ ==
Matthias Menck has been part of the international electronic music scene since the 1980s. As producer and DJ he helped to establish House Music in Hamburg. Whilst he was a young graduate audio engineer, he spent many sleepless nights in the recording studio and in the legendary Kontor Club where he was resident DJ. His first Gold and Platinum Record status he achieved with Brooklyn Bounce, one of his early commercial projects.
In later years, as his musical career developed and inspired by his many international DJ gigs, Matthias has moved away from commercial sounds and has gone back to his roots. Which lie unmistakably in the House music. Matthias' productions and DJ sets authentically capture his musical history and stand out both musically and technically.
Aside from his solo projects (e.g. on Ministry of Sound) and remixes (e.g. DJ Antoine, Chris Kaeser, D.o.n.s. ) Menck works regularly with various Artists like Christoph Brüx, Thomas Gold, Jerry Ropero or D.O.N.S. and very closely with Terri B.

== Bands ==
- SMC Unity

Members: Sofie St. Claire, Matthias Menck, Christoph Brüx

- Dolphin Sound

Members: Christoph Brüx, Matthias Menck

- Brooklyn Bounce

Aliases: Abuna E, Beatbox, Boys-R-Us, Harmonic Beats, Mental Madness Productions
Members: Matthias Menck, Dennis Bohn

- Terraformer

Members: Dennis Bohn & Mattias Menck, Jan Miesner, Heiko Lempio

== Associated acts ==
- Christoph Brüx
- Dennis Bohn
- Thomas Gold
- Brooklyn Bounce
- Jens Lissat
- Marc et Claude
- Kool & The Gang
- Sofie St. Claire
- Jan Miesner
- Heiko Lempio
