= Boat Branch =

Stream in Hickman County, Tennessee, U.S.

Coordinates: 35.7497908°N 87.3038998°W

Boat Branch is a stream in Hickman County, Tennessee, in the United States. It is a tributary to Duck River.

== History ==
Boat Branch was named from the fact flatboats were built and kept there.

== See also ==
- List of rivers of Tennessee
