= State Health Insurance Program =

National program

State Health Insurance Programs (SHIP) are state-by-state independent advocacy and counseling agencies for Medicare clients, established by the Omnibus Budget Reconciliation Act of 1990. Funded by the U.S. Administration for Community Living (which itself is funded by annually the Departments of Labor, Health and Human Services, and Education, and also the Related Agencies Appropriations Act), they are staffed by volunteers and are not associated with any commercial enterprises. Their services are free, and are also available in the District of Columbia, Guam, Puerto Rico, and the U.S. Virgin Islands.
