= Saturday Night (The Underdog Project song) =

Single by The Underdog Project
- Released: April 2, 2002
- Genre: Eurodance; dance
- Length: 3:23 (radio version)
- Label: Polygram
- Producer(s): Toni Cottura

The Underdog Project singles chronology
"I Can't Handle It" (2001)	"Saturday Night" (2002)	"Summer Jam 2003" (2003)

"Saturday Night" is a single released in 2002 by the group The Underdog Project. The song is similar to their first hit "Summer Jam" as they both have the whistle in them. The single was a top-ten hit in the Flanders region of Belgium and the Netherlands, although it did not have much airplay in the US or UK.

== Track listing ==
- German CD single
1. "Saturday Night" (Radio Cut)
2. "Saturday Night" (Seven Gemini Remix)
3. "Saturday Night" (Extended)
4. "Saturday Night" (Alternative Version)
5. "Saturday Night" (Seven Gemini Remix Instrumental)
6. "Saturday Night" (Acappella)

== Charts ==
=== Weekly charts ===
Chart (2003–2004)	Peak position
Belgium (Ultratop 50 Flanders)	2
Belgium (Ultratop 50 Wallonia)	14
Denmark (Tracklisten)	11
Finland (Suomen virallinen lista)	11
France (SNEP)	26
Netherlands (Dutch Top 40)	9
Netherlands (Single Top 100)	9
Norway (VG-lista)	12
Romania (Romanian Top 100)	54
Sweden (Sverigetopplistan)	40

=== Year-end charts ===
Chart (2003)	Position
Belgium (Ultratop Flanders)	32
Netherlands (Dutch Top 40)	67
Netherlands (Single Top 100)	70
