= Seed Herbarium Image Project =

The Seed Herbarium Image Project (SHIP), is an initiative of the Arnold Arboretum of Harvard University to create a web-based repository of high-resolution digital images documenting the morphology of woody plant seeds and selected fruit structures. Headquartered at the Arboretum's Dana Greenhouse facility and coordinated and photographed by curatorial assistant Julie McIntosh Shapiro, the Seed Herbarium Image Project supports the work of educators and professionals in horticulture and the botanical sciences, particularly in conservation research and management of rare and endangered species. The digitized images of seeds offer an important new aid for teaching seed identification—a fundamental skill in plant propagation, hybridization, and distribution—and serve as a resource for nurserymen, horticulturists, botanical curators, taxonomists, ecologists, and the general public. SHIP also provides an online resource for botanical institutions and nurseries to verify their collections and inventories. SHIP is made possible through the generous support of the Stanley Smith Horticultural Trust, Cabot Family Charitable Trust, and the J. Frank Schmidt Family Charitable Foundation.

== Facilities ==
=== The Arnold Arboretum ===
The Arnold Arboretum of Harvard University, founded in 1872, is an arboretum located in the Jamaica Plain, and Roslindale sections of Boston, Massachusetts. It was designed by Frederick Law Olmsted and is the second largest "link" in the Emerald Necklace.

=== Dana Greenhouse ===
Construction of the Charles Stratton Dana Greenhouses began in May 1961 and the facility was operational by March 1962. The project was made possible by a generous donation by Martha Dana, who divided the income of her estate equally between the Arnold Arboretum, the Boston Symphony Orchestra, and the Boston Museum of Fine Arts. The donation to the Arboretum honored her father and his lasting interest in the institution. The four-and-a-half-acre plot contains a main building with four attached glasshouses measuring 17x51 feet each, a cold storage house, a bonsai house containing the Larz Anderson Bonsai Collection, a permanent shade house, and four nurseries. The main building contains work space with potting benches, vulcathane-surfaced tables, stainless steel sinks and computer stations with a thermal transfer printer for label-making, a cold storage room for seed stratification and propagule storage, a laboratory for cytological and morphological research, a conference room, office space, a small library, and a lunch room with complete locker facilities for staff.

=== The Seed Herbarium ===
Beginning in the 1960s, Arnold Arboretum propagator Al Fordham created a seed herbarium in the Dana Greenhouse. Collecting the seed of several hundred rare and unusual taxa, Fordham envisioned a unique resource for the identification and propagation of woody plants from around the world. Carrying forward Fordham's vision, Arboretum greenhouse staff continued to collect seed, and today maintain a seed herbarium of more than 2,000 samples, almost a third of which are from accessioned plants in the living collection. The SHIP team installed an on-location archival image library, which holds digital seed herbarium images. Each folder is alphabetically maintained including prints of the actual color photographs of the digital electronic files. SHIP has taken care to produce photographs on archival paper, filed them into acid-free, gov-spec folders to withstand consistent observation, and developed a nondestructive way to observe and diagnose seed identity. "On occasion, seed of rare and endangered species need immediate propagation, limiting our opportunities for studying physical characteristics. With digital imaging now an important protocol at the greenhouse, selected seed will go directly to the SHIP lab for documentation, preserving the integrity of the propagule in digital format. As such, even seed that requires immediate propagation will leave behind a visual record for future study"—Julie McIntosh Shapiro.

== Mission ==
The Seed Herbarium Image Project (SHIP) began in 2003 and has completed photography for the Arboretum's six national collections within the North American Plant Collections Consortium (NAPCC): Acer (Maples), Carya (Hickory), Fagus (Beech), Stewartia, Syringa (Lilacs), and Tsuga (Hemlock). Acer, Stewartia, and Syringa were a focus in 2007. Using new protocols and equipment developed for micro-photography, SHIP is documenting species within the Ericaceae (Heath Family). The Arnold Arboretums’ introductions of Ericaceae include Rhododendron schlippenbachii, R. vaseyi, and R. mucronulatum, all plants of importance to ornamental horticulture. The Arnold collection also includes rare and endangered plants such as Leiophyllum buxifolium and Elliottia racemosa. Even early introductions of agricultural crops, such as Vaccinium angustifolium and V. corymbosum are well represented.

SHIP is also working to document seed from our collection of Center for Plant Conservation (CPC) plants. All records for the image initiative are catalogued in the arboretum's collections management database, BG-BASE. Search functionality is hosted by the Royal Botanic Garden, Edinburgh, Scotland, UK.

The Arnold Arboretum's Seed Herbarium collections can be viewed in the online herbarium database and can be searched by entering the scientific name, family name, or Arboretum accession number. To date, seeds of the following genera are available through this resource: Abies, Acacia, Acer, Actinidia, Albizia, Alnus, Amorpha, Andromeda, Aralia, Arctostaphylos, Aronia, Berberis, Betula, Broussonetia, Buddleia, Callicarpa, Calycanthus, Carpinus, Carya, Cedrus, Celastrus, Celtis, Cephalanthus, Cercidiphyllum, Ceonothus, Elliottia, Enkianthus, Erica, Fagus, Ilex, Rhododendron, Stewartia, Syringa, Tsuga, Zabelia. The SHIP team has also compiled a gallery of closely allied species. The digital format and online availability allows for specimens to be used for study and comparison in new ways by online users all around the world.
