= Summer Jam (The Underdog Project song) =

2000 single by the Underdog Project

Single by the Underdog Project

from the album It Doesn't Matter
- Released: 24 July 2000
- Genre: Freestyle; 2-step garage (remixes)
- Length: 3:30 ("Summer Jam"); 3:50 ("Summer Jam 2003")
- Label: Polygram
- Songwriters: Vic Krishna; Christoph Brüx; Toni Cottura; Craig Scott Smart; Stephan Browarczyk; Shahin Moshirian
- Producer: Toni Cottura

The Underdog Project singles chronology
"Summer Jam" (2000)	"Tonight" (2000)

Alternative cover
- 2003 release

"Summer Jam" is a song by German-Belgian dance music group the Underdog Project. Released on 24 July 2000 as the lead single from their album It Doesn't Matter, the song was considered a big hit in Europe, peaking at number three in both Germany and Portugal, number five in Hungary, number 10 in Austria, and number 17 in Switzerland. It was later aired on some of the most popular radio stations in the United States, such as WPOW in Miami and New York City's WKTU.

"Summer Jam 2003", released in 2003, featured samples of Sunclub's 1997 hit "Fiesta De Los Tamborileros" and was similarly successful, topping the charts in both Belgium and the Netherlands and reaching the top five in Denmark, France, and Romania, the top 20 in the UK, and the top 40 in Sweden and Switzerland.

== Lyrics and music ==
Songwriter and composer(s): Vic Krishna, Christoph Brux, Toni Cottura, Craig Scott Smart, Stephan Browarczyk, Shahin Moshirian

== Track listings ==
=== "Summer Jam" ===
CD single - Germany

1. "Summer Jam" (Original Radio Edit)
2. "Summer Jam" (2-step Radio Edit)
3. "Summer Jam" (Acappella)
4. "Summer Jam" (Dennis The Menace Club Mix)

UK CD single (2001)

1. "Summer Jam" (Radio Edit) - 3:29
2. "Summer Jam" (Full Version) - 4:30
3. "Summer Jam" (The B-15 Project Remix) - 5:28
4. "Summer Jam" (Mr. Shabz Remix) - 3:53
5. "Summer Jam" (Free Heads Club Mix) - 6:30
6. "Summer Jam" (Greenfields Pancake Jam) - 5:47

=== "Summer Jam 2003" ===
CD single

1. "Summer Jam 2003" (DJ F.R.A.N.K.'s Summermix Radio Version) — 3:48
2. "Summer Jam 2003" (DJ Hardwell Bubbling Mix F Edit) — 3:40

CD single

1. "Summer Jam 2003" (DJ F.R.A.N.K.'s Summermix Radio Version) — 3:48
2. "Summer Jam 2003" (DJ F.R.A.N.K.'s Summermix Extended Version) — 5:08
3. "Summer Jam 2003" (DJ Hardwell Bubbling Mix) — 5:08

12" maxi

1. "Summer Jam 2003" (Dubaholics Wailing Mix) — 5:16
2. "Summer Jam 2003" (Original Extended Mix) — 4:30
3. "Summer Jam 2003" (Free Heads Mix) — 6:30
4. "Summer Jam 2003" (Free Heads Dub)

== Charts ==
=== Weekly charts ===
Original release

Chart (2000–2001)	Peak position
Austria (Ö3 Austria Top 40)	10
Canada CHR (Nielsen BDS)	17
Germany (GfK)	3
Hungary (Mahasz)	5
Portugal (AFP)	3
Switzerland (Schweizer Hitparade)	17

"Summer Jam 2003"

Chart (2003–2004)	Peak position
Belgium (Ultratop 50 Flanders)	1
Belgium (Ultratop 50 Wallonia)	1
Denmark (Tracklisten)	2
France (SNEP)	3
Germany (GfK)	86
Netherlands (Dutch Top 40)	1
Netherlands (Single Top 100)	1
Romania (Romanian Top 100)	4
Scottish Singles Sales (Official Charts)	20
Sweden (Sverigetopplistan)	36
Switzerland (Schweizer Hitparade)	24
UK Dance (Official Charts)	10
UK Singles (Official Charts)	14

=== Year-end charts ===
Chart (2000)	Position
Germany (Media Control)	25
Switzerland (Schweizer Hitparade)	90

Chart (2003)	Position
Belgium (Ultratop 50 Flanders)	1
Belgium (Ultratop 50 Wallonia)	2
France (SNEP)	30
Netherlands (Dutch Top 40)	1
Netherlands (Single Top 100)	2
Romania (Romanian Top 100)	44

=== Decade-end charts ===
Chart (2000–2009)	Position
Netherlands (Single Top 100)	11

== Certifications ==
Region	Certification	Certified units/sales
Belgium (BRMA)	Platinum	50,000^{*}
France (SNEP)	Gold	250,000^{*}
Germany (BVMI)	Platinum	500,000^{‡}
^{*} Sales figures based on certification alone.^{‡} Sales+streaming figures based on certification alone.
