= Brooklyn Bounce =

German dance band

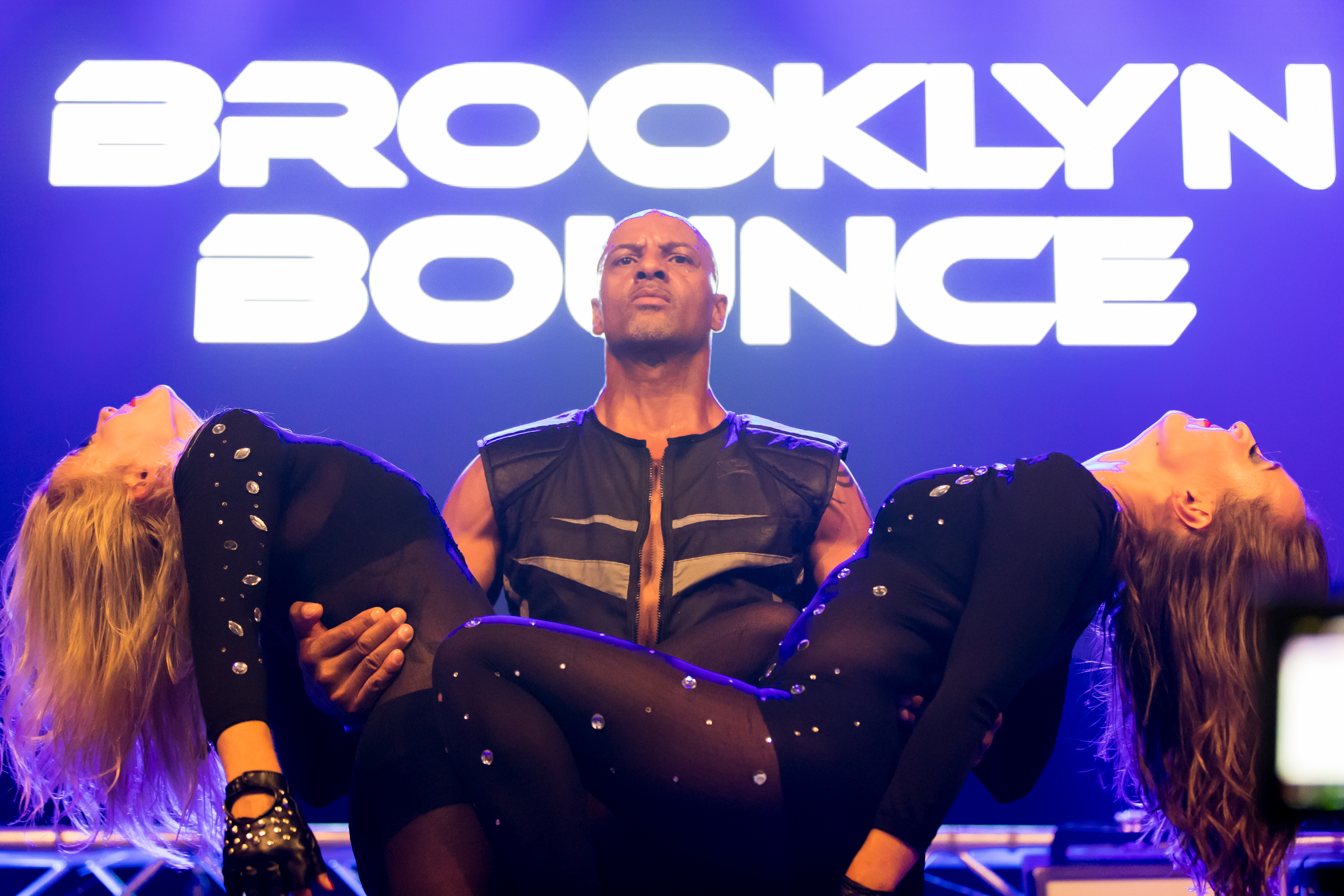

Background information
- Also known as: Mental Madness Productions, Abuna E, Beatbox feat. Rael
- Origin: Hamburg, Germany
- Genres: House, progressive house, progressive trance, hard trance, techno
- Years active: 1996–present
- Labels: Club Tools (1996-1999); Dance Division (2000-2002); Mental Madness (2003-present)
- Members: Dennis Bohn (D-Bone); René Behrens (Diablo)
- Past members: Matthias Menck; Stephan Zschoppe (Damon); Alexandra Cuevas-Moreno; Ulrica Bohn; Maeva Ehoulan; Dominic Ch.
- Website: "Official Website 2010". Brooklyn Bounce. Archived from the original on 2013-05-31.

Brooklyn Bounce is one of several pseudonyms used by German producers Matthias Menck (Double M) and Dennis Bohn (Bonebreaker). They have also produced music under the names Mental Madness Productions and Beatbox feat. Rael. Menck and Bohn have created remixes of a wide array of artists, including Scooter and Kool & the Gang.

== Career ==
Menck and Bohn, both natives to Hamburg, met in 1995. The pair had their first chart hit starring as Boyz R Us with the single "Singin' in My Mind". In 1996 the duo debuted as Brooklyn Bounce and released "The Theme (of Progressive Attack)" which scaled the German dance charts as a club favourite before becoming a crossover hit for the group as well. This success set up the band's debut album, The Beginning.

Menck and Bohn work solely in the studio and are not part of the Brooklyn Bounce live act. Instead, the group was fronted by several different vocalists and dancers, who have collaborated with the two German producers throughout the years. The list includes René "Diablo" Behrens (formerly of 666), Ulrika Bohn, Maeva Ehoulan, Alejandra Cuevas-Moreno and Stephan "Damon" Zschoppe. Vocalists were only credited from "Bass, Beats and Melody", released in November 2000.

In 2006, Mental Madness Records released an album titled System Shock (The Lost Album 1999), which features some of the earliest material by the production duo. This album is available only in a digital format.

== Discography ==
=== Singles ===
Year	Song	Chart positions											
Year	Song	GER	SUI	AUT	AUS	NL	HUN	SWE	U.S.	U.S. Dance	UK	FIN	SPA
1997	The Theme (of Progressive Attack)	9	9	-	-	-	6	-	-	-	-	-	-
1997	Get Ready to Bounce	6	21	7	-	-	1	17	95	10	86	20	-
1997	Take a Ride	28	39	22	-	-	-	35	-	-	-	-	-
1997	The Real Bass	23	-	22	-	-	-	44	-	19	-	-	-
1998	The Music's Got Me	39	49	30	-	-	-	58	-	41	67	-	-
1998	Contact	44	-	38	-	-	-	-	-	13	-	-	-
1998	Listen to the Bells	-	-	-	-	-	-	-	-	-	-	-	-
1999	Canda! (The Darkside Returns)	56	-	32	-	-	-	-	-	-	-	-	-
1999	Funk U	-	-	-	-	-	-	-	-	-	-	-	-
2000	Bass, Beats & Melody	4	43	2	52	-	11	47	-	-	-	-	-
2001	Born to Bounce (Music Is My Destiny)	22	94	14	-	-	2	-	-	-	-	-	-
2001	Club Bizarre	12	41	9	-	4	14	-	-	-	-	-	8
2002	Loud & Proud	9	88	9	-	-	9	-	-	-	-	-	-
2002	Bring it Back	30	-	24	-	-	-	-	-	-	-	-	-
2003	X2X (We Want More!)	37	-	33	-	-	-	-	-	-	-	-	-
2004	Crazy	52	-	32	-	-	-	-	-	-	-	-	-
2005	Sex, Bass & Rock 'n' Roll	94	-	-	67	-	-	-	-	-	-	-	-
2007	The Theme (of Progressive Attack) Recall (promo only)	-	-	-	-	-	-	-	-	-	-	-	-
2008	Get Ready to Bounce Recall '08 (promo only)	-	-	-	-	-	-	-	-	-	-	-	-
2009	Louder & Prouder	-	-	-	-	-	-	-	-	-	-	-	-
2012	Again & Again Nick Skitz & Basslouder (feat. Brooklyn Bounce)	-	-	-	-	-	-	-	-	-	-	-	-

=== Albums ===
Year	Album	Chart positions			
Year	Album	GER	SUI	AU	HUN
1997	The Beginning	24	37	24	1
1997	The Second Attack	86	-	-	2
1998	Re-Mixed Collection	-	-	-	-
2000	The Progressive Years	-	-	-	-
2001	Restart	24	-	25	3
2002	BB Nation	57	-	-	27
2004	Best of Brooklyn Bounce	-	-	-	-
2004	X-pect the Un-X-pected	-	-	-	-
2006	Best of Brooklyn Bounce 1996–2006 (Australia only)	-	-	-	-
2006	System Shock (The Lost Album 1999) (web-only release)	-	-	-	-
2010	BB-Styles	-	-	-	-

=== Other projects by Menck and Bohn ===
Beatbox feat. Rael

- 1998 "Let the Music Play"
- 1998 "Come into My Club" (with DJ Shahin and Stephan Browarczyk)
- 2000 "Show Me Love"

Boyz-R-Us

- 1996 "Singin' in my Mind" (with Emanuel Jones)
- 1998 "Singin' in my Mind '98" (with Emanuel Jones)
- 1999 "Alright" (with Emanuel Jones)
- 2002 "All Day/Let It All Out"

Other aliases

- 1997 "Follow Me", as Mental Madness Productions
- 1998 "Deeper Love", as Mental Madness Productions
- 1998 "Watch Me", as Abuna E
- 2000 "Druck! (Es Ist Zeit)", as DJ Bonebreaker
- 2001 "Friday Nite", as Double M (with Sophie Schmachl and Christoph Brüx)
- 2002 "Husten", as DJ Bonebreaker

Production for other artists

- 2001 Terraformer - "All Over" (with Natalie Tineo)
