= The Underdog Project =

German-Belgian dance music group

- Origin: Hamburg, Germany
- Genres: Eurodance, house, freestyle, 2-step
- Years active: 2000–present
- Labels: Radikal (Canada), Kontor (Germany) and Building Records (Brazil)
- Members: Craig Smart; Vic Krishna; DJ Frank; AJ Duncan

The Underdog Project is a German dance group which launched its first album, It Doesn't Matter in 2001. Their hits include "Saturday" (not to be confused with "Saturday Night"; this was not released until two years after the album had come out), "Summer Jam" and "Tonight". The band has four members: Vic Krishna (vocals), Craig Smart (vocals), DJ Frank (remixes) and AJ Duncan (keyboards).

== Career ==
The band was formed when Canadian artist Vick Krishna was visiting Germany and had a jam session with Canadian singer Craig Smart and the production team of ToneDef and Triple S. It went well, so they started recording; mostly demo tapes, but also full-fledged tracks. When there was enough material for an album, It Doesn't Matter was the result.

The group's most popular track, "Summer Jam", was one of the biggest pop hits in Europe. At one point, it was on the rotation list of every pop radio station in Germany. It also received much attention in the UK and US. "Summer Jam" reached a high of No. 2 on the German pop charts. MTV Germany and VIVA both supported the video, adding even more exposure. The biggest dance radio station in New York City, WKTU, also expressed support for the record and added it to their playlist, as well as market leader Power 96 in Miami. In addition to the original set of mixes, new mixes of the song have been completed by various remixers to enhance the record's appeal to a wider variety of club DJs. Most notable is the "Dance Movement Extended Mix", done by Nitelite Record's Max Maroldo. The record became a top 20 pop hit in Italy. Other mixes included a 2-step garage version, "DJ Wickel's 2-Step Mix", a Dutch trance version, "Greenfields Pancake Jam", and progressive house versions, the "Free Heads Club Mix" and "Free Heads Dub".

== Discography ==
=== Studio albums ===
List of albums, with selected chart positions
Title	Album details	Peak chart positions				
Title	Album details	AUS	BEL	DEN	FRA	GER
It Doesn't Matter	Released: 20 November 2000; Label: Radikal; Format: CD, digital download	3	57	16	74	2
"—" denotes items that did not chart or were not released.

=== Singles ===
List of singles, with selected chart positions, showing year released and album name
Title	Year	Peak chart positions										Album
Title	Year	BEL (Vl)	BEL (Wa)	DEN	FRA	GER	NED	SWE	SWI	UK	IT	Album
"Summer Jam"	2000	—	—	—	—	3	—	—	17	—	7	It Doesn't Matter
"Tonight"	2000	—	—	—	—	—	—	—	—	—	-	It Doesn't Matter
"I Can't Handle It"	2001	—	—	—	—	70	—	—	—	—	—	It Doesn't Matter
"Saturday Night"	2002	2	14	11	26	—	9	40	—	19	—	Non-album single
"Summer Jam 2003"	2003	1	1	2	3	86	1	36	24	14	—	Non-album single
"Winter Jam"	2003	16	—	—	—	—	19	—	—	—	—	Non-album single
"Remember"	2004	—	—	—	—	—	—	—	—	—	—	Non-album single
"Miami"	2004	—	—	—	—	—	—	—	—	—	—	Non-album single
"Girls of Summer"	2006	—	—	—	—	—	—	—	—	—	—	Non-album single
"—" denotes a title that did not chart, or was not released in that territory.
