= Alberto Hauss =

German composer and producer (1954–2025)

Alberto Hauss (9 March 1954 – October 2025) also known as Ingo Hauss and Bela Lagonda, was a German composer and producer. He worked on projects with artists such as Oliver Cheatham, Beats 4 You, Chocolate, U96, F.R.E.U.D, Boytronic, ATC, and Culture Beat. He died on 21 October 2025.
