= Das Boot (video game) =

1990 submarine simulator game

- Developer(s): Artech Digital Entertainment
- Publisher(s): Three-Sixty Pacific
- Designer(s): Paul Butler; Rick Banks
- Platform(s): MS-DOS, Amiga
- Release: Amiga: NA: 1990; MS-DOS: NA: 1991
- Genre(s): Submarine simulator
- Mode(s): Single-player

Das Boot: German U-boat Simulation is a submarine simulator video game designed by Paul Butler and Rick Banks and published in 1990 for Amiga and MS-DOS by Three-Sixty Pacific. The game was inspired by the 1973 novel Das Boot and its 1981 German film adaptation.

The player takes command of a German Type VII U-boat and plays missions against the Allies which involve combat against aircraft, anti-submarine warships, and other submarines. The game was touted to feature 256 VGA Color, 3D Views, and historical realism.

== Release ==
The MS-DOS version was released on 3.5" floppy disks and came packaged with a copy of the novel of the same name.

== Reception ==
Computer Gaming World in 1991 panned the game as a serious submarine simulator, noting several issues such a frustrating user interface, unrealistic mechanics, and limited information presented to the player compared to other games of the same genre. The magazine did, however, praise the game as an arcade-shoot-'em-up but warned fans of the movie to avoid the game.
