= Das Boot (song) =

1991 single by U96

- Standard European artwork

Single by U96

from the album Das Boot
- Released: December 1991
- Genre: House; techno
- Length: 3:25
- Label: Polydor
- Songwriter: Klaus Doldinger
- Producers: Matiz; AC 16

U96 singles chronology
"Das Boot" (1991)	"I Wanna Be a Kennedy" (1992)

Music video
- "Das Boot" on YouTube

Alternative cover
- UK artwork

Alternative cover
- "Das Boot" / "Kennedy" artwork

"Das Boot" (English: "The Boat") is the title theme to the film and TV series Das Boot, composed and produced by Klaus Doldinger, and released as a single in 1981. In 1991, the song was covered by German DJ and producer Alex Christensen and his dance music project U96. This techno version was U96's debut single, released by Polydor Records from the album of the same name (1992).

On the German Singles Chart, "Das Boot" spent 13 weeks at number one in early 1992, doing so with minimal airplay support. It also became a number-one hit in Austria, Norway and Switzerland and entered the top 10 in Denmark, Finland, France, the Netherlands and Sweden. In the United Kingdom, it peaked at number 18 on the UK Singles Chart. The song was the subject of many remixes throughout the years.

== Critical reception ==
Ian Gittins from Melody Maker complimented the song as a "portentous novelty house hit", "complete with marine sound effects, submarine noises and the legendary lyric Techno, techno". He concluded, "Compelling and absurdly addictive." Pan-European magazine Music & Media remarked, "With no significant airplay, this techno version of the theme to the movie Das Boot is number one for the second consecutive week in Germany. It's like Kraftwerk on acid, or plain Front 242." James Hamilton from Music Week's RM Dance Update wrote, "This Hamburg based DJ's vocoder produced and Asdic pinged techno treatment of Klaus Doldinger's original theme is in basic chugging 0-122.9bpm Techno (with beat losing edits midway), far fiercer smoothly thrumming electro 0-127.1bpm Strings 127, Accordian, Echo Mix, 127 BPM and — fiercest of all — 0-130.9bpm 131 BPM versions. Dive! Dive! Dive!"

== Chart performance ==
"Das Boot" peaked at number one in Germany, Norway and Switzerland. In Germany, it spent 13 weeks atop the Media Control singles chart despite being largely ignored by German radio. It was also the first single to top the chart on only one format: a 12-inch single. "Das Boot" also entered the top 10 in Belgium, Denmark, Finland, France, the Netherlands and Sweden, as well as on the Eurochart Hot 100, where it reached number three in May 1992, after 17 weeks on the chart. Additionally, "Das Boot" peaked within the top 20 in Ireland and the United Kingdom. In the latter country, it debuted at number 37 and peaked at number 18 during its third week on the UK Singles Chart, on 6 September 1992. Outside Europe, the song became a number-one hit in Israel, peaking at that position in its third week on the chart, on 28 April 1992. "Das Boot" was awarded with a gold record in Austria, with a sale of 25,000 copies.

== Music video ==
The accompanying music video for "Das Boot" was directed by Peter Claridge. It used footage from the 1981 German submarine film Das Boot, directed by Wolfgang Petersen. When the song peaked at number one in Germany, the video had not yet been produced.

== Track listings ==
- 7-inch single
1. "Das Boot"
2. "Das Boot" (Mickey Finn full version)
- 12-inch maxi
1. "Das Boot" (techno version) – 5:14
2. "Tiefenrausch" – 4:18
- CD maxi
1. "Das Boot" (techno version) – 5:14
2. "Tiefenrausch" – 4:18
3. "Das Boot" (trigger version) – 5:14
- Cassette
1. "Das Boot" (techno version) – 5:14
2. "Das Boot" (trigger version) – 5:14
- CD maxi – Remixes
1. "Das Boot / Kennedy" (Megamix – I Wanna Be a Kennedy) – 6:14
2. "Sonar Sequences – 6:13
3. "Das Boot" – 3:25
- CD maxi – 2001 remixes
1. "Das Boot 2001" (radio edit) – 3:41
2. "Das Boot 2001" (DJ Mellow-D remix) – 8:22
3. "Das Boot 2001" (Cosmic Gate remix) – 7:41
4. "Anthem 2001" – 3:19
- 12-inch maxi – 2001 remixes
1. "Das Boot 2001" (Cosmic Gate remix) – 7:41
2. "Das Boot 2001" (DJ Errik remix) – 8:05
3. "Das Boot 2001" (Schiller remix) – 8:23
4. "Das Boot 2001" (Avancada remix) – 8:12
- D72 Remix
1. "Das Boot V2" (D72 Extended Remix) - 6:26

== Charts ==
=== Weekly charts ===
==== "Das Boot" ====
Chart (1992)	Peak position
Australia (ARIA)	197
Austria (Ö3 Austria Top 40)	1
Belgium (Ultratop 50 Flanders)	11
Belgium (Ultratop 50 Wallonia)	7
Denmark (IFPI)	3
Europe (Eurochart Hot 100)	3
Finland (Suomen virallinen lista)	9
France (SNEP) with "Kennedy"	9
Germany (GfK)	1
Ireland (IRMA)	19
Israel (Israeli Singles Chart)	1
Netherlands (Dutch Top 40)	4
Netherlands (Single Top 100)	3
Norway (VG-lista)	1
Sweden (Sverigetopplistan)	5
Switzerland (Schweizer Hitparade)	1
UK Singles (Official Charts)	18
UK Dance (Music Week)	27
UK Club Chart (Music Week)	64

==== "Boot II" ====
Chart (1995)	Peak position
Finland (Suomen virallinen lista)	10
Sweden (Sverigetopplistan)	53

==== "Das Boot 2001" ====
Chart (2001)	Peak position
Austria (Ö3 Austria Top 40)	12
Germany (GfK)	16
Switzerland (Schweizer Hitparade)	41

=== Year-end charts ===
Chart (1992)	Position
Austria (Ö3 Austria Top 40)	4
Belgium (Ultratop 50 Flanders)	80
Europe (Eurochart Hot 100)	11
Germany (Media Control)	3
Netherlands (Dutch Top 40)	33
Netherlands (Single Top 100)	35
Sweden (Topplistan)	16
Switzerland (Schweizer Hitparade)	9

=== Decade-end charts ===
Chart (1990–1999)	Rank
Austria (Ö3 Austria Top 40)	72

== Certifications ==
Region	Certification	Certified units/sales
Austria (IFPI Austria)	Gold	25,000^{*}
^{*} Sales figures based on certification alone.

== Release history ==
Region	Date	Format(s)	Label(s)	Ref.
Germany	December 1991	—N/a	Polydor	
Australia	13 April 1992	CD; cassette	Polydor	
United Kingdom	17 August 1992	7-inch vinyl; 12-inch vinyl; CD; cassette	M&G; Polydor	

== See also ==
- Das Boot (novel), a novel by Lothar-Günther Buchheim from 1973
- Das Boot (TV series), a German television series sequel to the 1981 film
- Das Boot (album), a 1992 album by U96 from 1992
- Das Boot (video game), a 1991 video game inspired by the novel of the same name
