= D-Cru =

Canadian contemporary R&B group

- Origin: Vancouver, British Columbia, Canada
- Genres: R&B, pop
- Years active: 1998–early 2000s
- Past members: Nicole Hutton; Tito Chipman; Craig Smart; Damien Kyles; Aimee Mackenzie; Troy "Golden Child" Samson

D-Cru was a Canadian R&B music group formed in Vancouver, consisting of singers Nicole Hutton, Tito Chipman, Craig Smart, Troy "Golden Child" Samson, Damien Kyles and Aimee Mackenzie.

== Career ==
They released their self-titled debut album, D-Cru in 2000. The album featured their biggest hit, the ballad "I Will Be Waiting", a top-ten hit in Canada. The album's other main single on the Canadian charts (reaching number 11 and remaining on the charts for six months) was "Show Me", which sampled the chorus from the song "Show Me the Way", which was originally a hit for Mackenzie's old group The West End Girls in 1991.

D-Cru band member Craig Smart later contributed back-up vocals on two tracks for Master P's album Game Face.

They received a Juno Award nomination in 2001 for Best R&B/Soul Recording for "I Will Be Waiting".

== Discography ==
=== Studio albums ===
- The Outer World (1998)
- Into the Future (2002)

=== Singles ===
Year	Single	Peak chart positions	Album
Year	Single	CAN	Album
1999	"Show Me"	11	The Outer World
2000	"I Will Be Waiting"	9	The Outer World
"—" denotes releases that did not chart
