= Bass Bumpers =

German DJ team

- Origin: Germany
- Genres: Eurodance
- Years active: 1990–present
- Labels: Dance Street Records
- Members: Henning Reith; Caba Kroll; CJ Stone; George Dee; Akira Yamamoto; Reinhard "DJ Voodoo" Raith

Bass Bumpers are a German DJ and record production team, known for their Eurodance/techno music.

== Background ==
They are originally from Germany, with members Henning Reith, Caba Kroll, CJ Stone, George Dee, Akira Yamamoto, and Reinhard "DJ Voodoo" Raith. They produced their own hits such as "Good Fun", "The Music's Got Me!" (a number 36 hit on Billboard's Hot Dance Club Songs chart in 1992), "Move to the Rhythm" and "Rhythm Is a Dancer 2003" with Snap!. Perhaps their biggest success was when they co-produced Crazy Frog's remake of the popular hit "Axel F", which peaked at number one in the UK on 31 May 2005.

In 1992, they also produced some songs for Amanda Lear's album Cadavrexquis.

Their own tracks, "The Music's Got Me!" (1992) and "Runnin'" (1993) were minor hits on the UK Singles Chart. The group also had a UK hit single in 2006 with a mash-up of "Phat Planet" by Leftfield and the Baywatch theme tune (as performed on the TV show's credits by Survivor vocalist Jimi Jamison as "I'm Always Here"). This new version was entitled "Phat Beach (I'll Be Ready)", with the group being credited as Naughty Boy (four years before British record producer Shahid Khan had a hit on the UK charts under that name.

In 2015, the group released "The Music's Got Me!" with new mixes from North2South, La Chord, and Taito Tikaro.

== Discography ==
=== Albums ===
List of albums, with selected chart positions
Title	Album details	Peak chart positions
Title	Album details	AUS
Advance / The Music's Got Me!	Released: 1992; Label: Dance Street	166
Recouped Advance	Released: 1993; Label: Dance Street	—
The Best Of Bass Bumpers	Released: 1994; Label: Dance Street; Note: Greatest Hits compilation	—
Dance History (featuring E. Mello & Felicia)	Released: 2004; Label: ZYX Music; Note: Compilation	—

=== Singles ===
Year	Single	Peak chart positions					Album
Year	Single	AUS	FRA	GER	SUI	UK	Album
1990	"Can't Stop Dancing"	—	—	—	—	—	Advance
1991	"Get the Big Bass"	—	—	—	—	—	Advance
1992	"The Music's Got Me!"	179	16	—	—	25	Advance
1992	"Move to the Rhythm"	160	37	—	40	—	Advance
1992	"Mega Bump"	—	—	—	—	—	Single only
1993	"Runnin'"	—	36	—	—	68	Recouped Advance
1994	"Good Fun"	—	—	—	39	—	Singles only
1995	"Keep on Pushing"	—	—	94	—	—	Singles only
1997	"The Music Got Me '97"	—	—	—	—	—	Singles only
2003	"The Music Turns Me On (Ladadi Ladada)"	—	—	—	—	—	Singles only
"—" denotes releases that did not chart
