= List of number-one hits (Germany) =

The GfK Entertainment charts are record charts compiled by GfK Entertainment on behalf of the Bundesverband Musikindustrie (BVMI).

== Lists of number-ones ==
=== 1950s ===
- 1950s
- 1954
- 1955
- 1956
- 1957
- 1958
- 1959

=== 1960s ===
- 1960
- 1961
- 1962
- 1963
- 1964
- 1965
- 1966
- 1967
- 1968
- 1969

=== 1970s ===
- 1970
- 1971
- 1972
- 1973
- 1974
- 1975
- 1976
- 1977
- 1978
- 1979

=== 1980s ===
- 1980
- 1981
- 1982
- 1983
- 1984
- 1985
- 1986
- 1987
- 1988
- 1989

=== 1990s ===
- 1990
- 1991
- 1992
- 1993
- 1994
- 1995
- 1996
- 1997
- 1998
- 1999

=== 2000s ===
- 2000
- 2001
- 2002
- 2003
- 2004
- 2005
- 2006
- 2007
- 2008
- 2009

=== 2010s ===
- 2010
- 2011
- 2012
- 2013
- 2014
- 2015
- 2016
- 2017
- 2018
- 2019

=== 2020s ===
- 2020
- 2021
- 2022
- 2023
- 2024
- 2025
- 2026

== Achievements and milestones ==
=== Song milestones ===
==== Most weeks at number one ====
Song	Artist(s)	Wks.	Year(s)	Ref.
"All I Want for Christmas Is You"	Mariah Carey	22	2019-25	
"Ganz Paris träumt von der Liebe"	Caterina Valente and Kurt Edelhagen	21	1955	
"Heimweh"	Freddy Quinn	21	1956	
"Cindy, Oh Cindy"	Margot Eskens	21	1957	
"Die Gitarre und das Meer"	Freddy Quinn	17	1959	
"Rivers of Babylon"	Boney M.	17	1978	
"Despacito"	Luis Fonsi featuring Daddy Yankee	17	2017	
"Verdammt, ich lieb' dich"	Matthias Reim	16	1990	
"A Song of Joy"	Miguel Ríos	15	1970/71	
"Butterfly"	Danyel Gérard	15	1971	
"Shape of You"	Ed Sheeran	15	2017	
"Wheels"	Billy Vaughn	14	1961	
"Junge, komm bald wieder"	Freddy Quinn	14	1963	
"I'd Love You to Want Me"	Lobo	14	1973/74	
"Dragostea din tei"	O-Zone	14	2004	
"Banana Boat Song"	Harry Belafonte	13	1957	
"River Kwai March"	Mitch Miller	13	1958	
"Paloma Blanca"	George Baker Selection	13	1975	
"Das Boot"	U96	13	1992	
"Time to Say Goodbye"	Andrea Bocelli and Sarah Brightman	13	1996/97	
"My Heart Will Go On"	Celine Dion	13	1998	
"Poker Face"	Lady Gaga	13	2009	
"The Fate of Ophelia"	Taylor Swift	13	2025/26	
"Il Silenzio"	Nini Rosso	12	1965	
"Daddy Cool"	Boney M.	12	1976	
"Sweat (A La La La La Long)"	Inner Circle	12	1992	
"Somewhere Over the Rainbow/What a Wonderful World"	Israel Kamakawiwoʻole	12	2010	
"Human"	Rag'n'Bone Man	12	2016	
"Komet"	Udo Lindenberg and Apache 207	12	2023	
"Der lachende Vagabund"	Fred Bertelmann	11	1958	
"Ramona"	Blue Diamonds	11	1961	
"Words"	F. R. David	11	1982	
"Nothing Compares 2 U"	Sinéad O'Connor	11	1990	
"Sadeness Part I"	Enigma	11	1990/91	
"Wind of Change"	Scorpions	11	1991	
"Conquest of Paradise"	Vangelis	11	1995	
"I'll Be Missing You"	Puff Daddy and Faith Evans featuring 112	11	1997	
"Mambo N° 5"	Lou Bega	11	1999	
"Whenever, Wherever"	Shakira	11	2002	
"Ein Stern (…der deinen Namen trägt)"	DJ Ötzi and Nik P.	11	2007	
"Hello"	Adele	11	2015/16	
"In My Mind"	Dynoro and Gigi D'Agostino	11	2018	
"The Emptiness Machine"	Linkin Park	11	2024	
"Am Tag, als der Regen kam"	Dalida	10	1959	
"Rock Your Baby"	George McCrae	10	1974	
"Mull of Kintyre"	Wings	10	1978	
"Funkytown"	Lipps Inc.	10	1980	
"Polonäse Blankenese"	Gottlieb Wendehals	10	1981/82	
"Lambada"	Kaoma	10	1989	
"Another Day in Paradise"	Phil Collins	10	1989/90	
"Let's Talk About Sex"	Salt-N-Pepa	10	1991/92	
"Schnappi, das kleine Krokodil"	Schnappi	10	2005	
"Ai Se Eu Te Pego!"	Michel Teló	10	2012	
"Diamonds"	Rihanna	10	2012/13	
"Wake Me Up!"	Avicii	10	2013	
"Faded"	Alan Walker	10	2016	
"Don't Be So Shy (Filatov & Karas Remix)"	Imany	10	2016	
"Perfect"	Ed Sheeran	10	2017/18	
"Dance Monkey"	Tones and I	10	2019/20	
"Blinding Lights"	The Weeknd	10	2020	
"Wellerman"	Nathan Evans	10	2021	

==== Most number-one singles ====
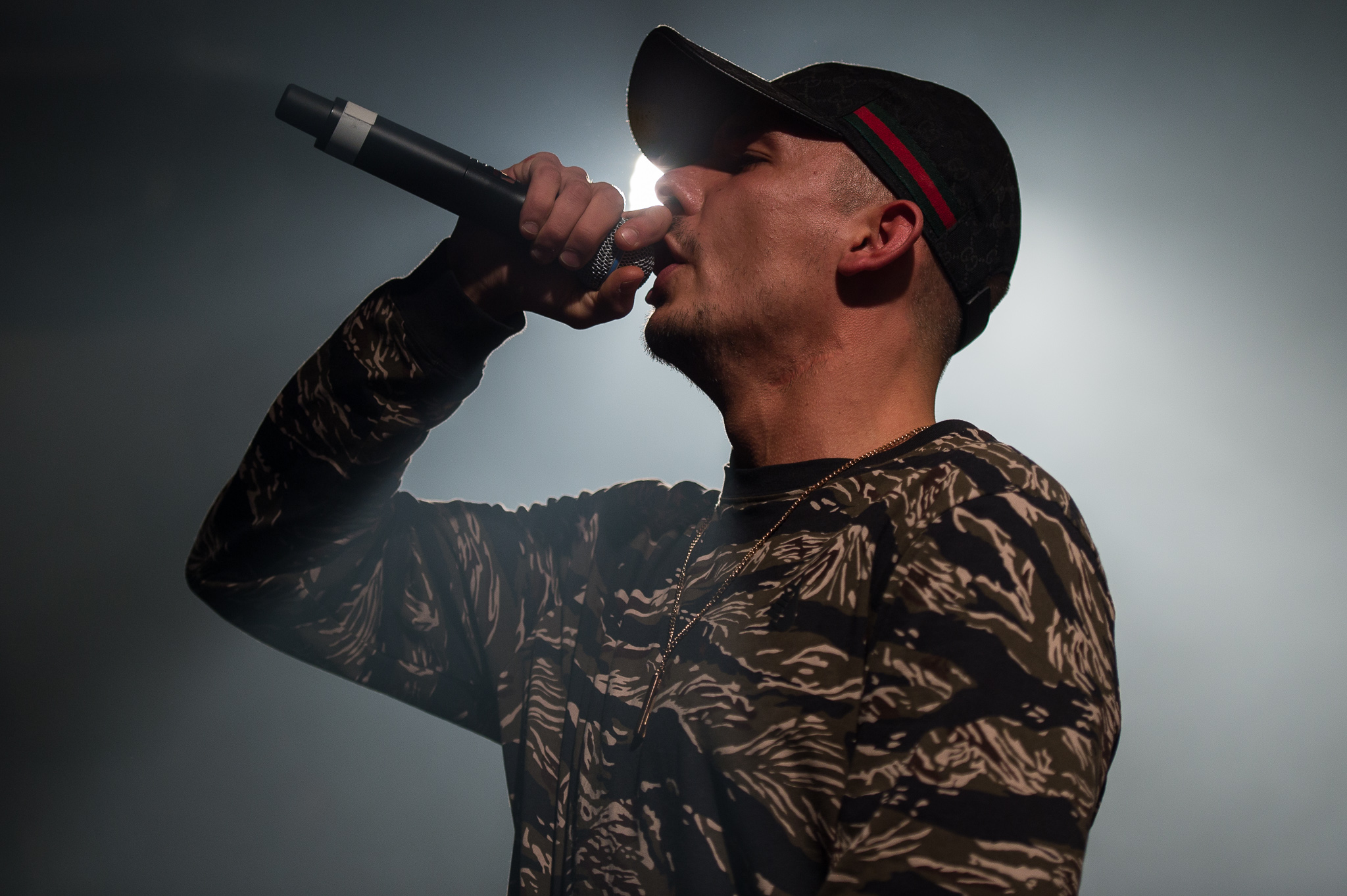
German rapper Capital Bra is the most successful artist on the German single charts with 22 number-one hits.

Artist	No.	Songs	Ref.
Capital Bra	22	"5 Songs in einer Nacht"; "Neymar"; "One Night Stand"; "Berlin lebt"; "Für euch alle"; "Melodien"; "Roli Glitzer Glitzer"; "Benzema"; "Prinzessa"; "DNA"; "Wir ticken"; "Cherry Lady"; "Wieder Lila"; "Royal Rumble"; "Tilidin"; "Zombie"; "Nummer 1"; "110"; "Der Bratan bleibt der gleiche"; "Baby"; "Nicht verdient"; "Frühstück in Paris"	
The Beatles	12	"Komm, gib mir deine Hand"; "Paperback Writer"; "Yellow Submarine"; "Penny Lane"; "All You Need Is Love"; "Hello, Goodbye"; "Hey Jude"; "Ob-La-Di, Ob-La-Da"; "Get Back"; "The Ballad of John and Yoko"; "Come Together" / "Something"; "Now and Then"	
Samra	10	"Für euch alle"; "Cataleya"; "Wir ticken"; "Harami"; "Wieder Lila"; "Royal Rumble"; "Tilidin"; "Zombie"; "Nummer 1"; "110"	
ABBA	9	"Waterloo"; "SOS"; "Mamma Mia"; "Fernando"; "Dancing Queen"; "Money, Money, Money"; "Knowing Me, Knowing You"; "Super Trouper"; "One of Us"	
Boney M.	8	"Daddy Cool"; "Sunny"; "Ma Baker"; "Belfast"; "Rivers of Babylon"; "Rasputin"; "Mary's Boy Child / Oh My Lord"; "El Lute"	
Sweet	8	"Co-Co"; "Little Willy"; "Wig-Wam Bam"; "Block Buster!"; "Hell Raiser"; "The Ballroom Blitz"; "Teenage Rampage"; "Fox on the Run"	
The Rolling Stones	7	"The Last Time"; "(I Can't Get No) Satisfaction"; "Get Off of My Cloud"; "19th Nervous Breakdown"; "Let's Spend the Night Together"; "Jumpin' Jack Flash"; "Living in a Ghost Town"	
Freddy Quinn	6	"Heimweh"; "Die Gitarre und das Meer"; "Unter fremden Sternen"; "La Paloma"; "Junge, komm bald wieder"; "Hundert Mann und ein Befehl"	
Sarah Connor	5	"From Sarah with Love"; "Music Is the Key"; "Just One Last Dance"; "Living to Love You"; "From Zero to Hero"	
Loredana	5	"Kein Plan"; "Kein Wort"; "Angst"; "Du bist mein"; "Nicht verdient"; "Rosenkrieg"	
Mero	5	"Baller los"; "Hobby Hobby"; "Ferrari"; "Wolke 10"; "Kein Plan"	
Modern Talking	5	"You're My Heart, You're My Soul"; "You Can Win If You Want"; "Cheri, Cheri Lady"; "Brother Louie"; "Atlantis Is Calling (S.O.S. for Love)"	
Rihanna	5	"Umbrella"; "Don't Stop the Music"; "Love the Way You Lie"; "We Found Love"; "Diamonds"	
Caterina Valente	5	"Ganz Paris träumt von der Liebe"; "Steig in das Traumboot der Liebe"; "Wo meine Sonne scheint"; "Itsy Bitsy Teenie Weenie Honolulu-Strand-Bikini"; "Ein Schiff wird kommen"	

==== Most number-one singles in a calendar year ====
Artist	Year	No.	Songs	Ref.
Capital Bra	2019	11	"Prinzessa"; "DNA"; "Wir ticken"; "Cherry Lady"; "Wieder Lila"; "Royal Rumble"; "Tilidin"; "Zombie"; "Nummer 1"; "110"; "Der Bratan bleibt der gleiche"	
Samra	2019	8	"Wir ticken"; "Harami"; "Wieder lila"; "Royal Rumble"; "Tilidin"; "Zombie"; "Nummer 1"; "110"	
Capital Bra	2018	8	"5 Songs in einer Nacht"; "Neymar"; "One Night Stand"; "Berlin lebt"; "Melodien"; "Roli Glitzer Glitzer"; "Benzema"	

=== Songwriter and producer achievements ===
==== Most number-one singles ====
Artist	No.	Songs	Ref.
Dieter Bohlen	23	"You're My Heart, You're My Soul"; "You Can Win If You Want"; "Cheri, Cheri Lady"; "Brother Louie"; "Midnight Lady"; "Atlantis Is Calling (S.O.S. for Love); "We have a Dream"; "Take Me Tonight"; "You Drive Me Crazy"; "Für dich"; "Free Like the Wind"; "Du hast mein Herz gebrochen"; "Now or Never"; "You Can Get It"; "Summer Love"; "Anything But Love"; "Don't Believe"; "Call My Name"; "Don't Think About Me"; "Mein Herz"; "Glücksmoment"; "Cherry Lady"; "Eine Nacht"	
Capital Bra	21	"5 Songs in einer Nacht"; "Neymar"; "One Night Stand"; "Berlin lebt"; "Für euch alle"; "Melodien"; "Roli Glitzer Glitzer"; "Benzema"; "Prinzessa"; "DNA"; "Wir ticken"; "Cherry Lady"; "Wieder Lila"; "Royal Rumble"; "Tilidin"; "Zombie"; "Nummer 1"; "110"; "Der Bratan bleibt der gleiche"; "Baby"; "Nicht verdient"	
Kurt Feltz	15	"Wir, wir, wir haben ein Klavier"; "Ganz Paris träumt von der Liebe; "Die Gypsy Band"; "He, Mister Banjo"; "Steig in das Traumboot der Liebe"; "Smoky"; "Cindy, Oh Cindy"; "Wo meine Sonne scheint"; "Souvenirs"; "Heißer Sand"; "Barcarole in der Nacht"; "Vom Stadtpark die Laternen"; "Der letzte Walzer"; "Liebeslied"; "Adios amor"	
Paul McCartney	15	"Komm, gib mir deine Hand"; "Paperback Writer"; "Yellow Submarine"; "Penny Lane"; "All You Need Is Love"; "Hello, Goodbye"; "Hey Jude"; "Ob-La-Di, Ob-La-Da"; "Get Back"; "The Ballad of John and Yoko"; "Come Together"; "Mull of Kintyre"; "Stars on 45"; "Ebony and Ivory"; "Now and Then"	
John Lennon	13	"Komm, gib mir deine Hand"; "Paperback Writer"; "Yellow Submarine"; "Penny Lane"; "All You Need Is Love"; "Hello, Goodbye"; "Hey Jude"; "Ob-La-Di, Ob-La-Da"; "Get Back"; "The Ballad of John and Yoko"; "Come Together"; "Stars on 45"; "Now and Then"	
Benny Andersson and Björn Ulvaeus	11	"Waterloo"; "SOS"; "Mamma Mia"; "Fernando"; "Dancing Queen"; "Money, Money, Money"; "Knowing Me, Knowing You"; "Super Trouper"; "One of Us"; "One Night in Bangkok"; "Hung Up"	
Mike Chapman and Nicky Chinn	10	"Co-Co"; "Little Willy"; "Wig-Wam Bam"; "Block Buster!"; "Hell Raiser"; "Can the Can"; "Ballroom Blitz"; "Teenage Rampage"; "Living Next Door to Alice"; "Lay Back in the Arms of Someone"	
Samra	10	"Für euch alle"; "Cataleya"; "Wir ticken"; "Harami"; "Wieder Lila"; "Royal Rumble"; "Tilidin"; "Zombie"; "Nummer 1"; "110"	
The Cratez	9	"Was du Liebe nennst"; "5 Songs in einer Nacht"; "Neymar"; "One Night Stand"; "Berlin lebt"; "Für euch alle"; "Melodien"; "Kokain"; "500 PS"	

==== Most number-one singles in a calendar year ====
Artist	Year	No.	Songs	Ref.
The Cratez	2018	9	"Was du Liebe nennst"; "5 Songs in einer Nacht"; "Neymar"; "One Night Stand"; "Berlin lebt"; "Für euch alle"; "Melodien"; "Kokain"; "500 PS"	
Stock Aitken Waterman	1987	4	"Showing Out (Get Fresh at the Weekend)"; "Respectable"; "Never Gonna Give You Up"; "Whenever You Need Somebody"	
Benny Andersson and Björn Ulvaeus	1976	4	"Mamma Mia"; "Fernando"; "Dancing Queen"; "Money, Money, Money"	
Mike Chapman and Nicky Chinn	1973	4	"Block Buster!"; "Hell Raiser"; "Can the Can"; "Ballroom Blitz"	
Lennon–McCartney	1969	4	"Ob-La-Di, Ob-La-Da"; "Get Back"; "The Ballad of John and Yoko"; "Come Together"	
Loredana	2020	4	"Kein Wort"; "Angst"; "Du bist mein"; "Nicht Verdient"	
