= David Garrick (disambiguation) =

David Garrick (1717–1779) was a British actor, playwright, theatre manager and producer.

David Garrick may also refer to:

- David Garrick (play), 1864 play by Thomas William Robertson
- David Garrick (singer) (1945–2013), best known for his 1966 pop hit Dear Mrs. Applebee
- David Byron (1947–1985), British lead vocalist of Uriah Heep fame, whose original surname was Garrick
- David Garrick (1913 film), a silent film based on the 1864 play
- David Garrick (1914 film), starring Clara Kimball Young
- David Garrick (1916 film)
