= List of number-one hits of 1957 (Germany) =

This is a list of the German Media Control Top100 Singles Chart number-ones of 1957.

Issue date	Song	Artist
5 January	"Smoky"	Die Sieben Raben
12 January	"Smoky"	Die Sieben Raben
19 January	"Oh Billy Boy"	Club Argentina
26 January	"Oh Billy Boy"	Club Argentina
2 February	"Sei zufrieden"	Lukas-Trio
9 February	"Sei zufrieden"	Lukas-Trio
16 February	"Ich weiß was dir fehlt"	Peter Alexander
23 February	"Ich weiß was dir fehlt"	Peter Alexander
2 March	"Ich weiß was dir fehlt"	Peter Alexander
9 March	"Cindy, Oh Cindy"	Wolfgang Sauer
16 March	"Cindy, Oh Cindy"	Wolfgang Sauer
23 March	"Cindy, Oh Cindy"	Wolfgang Sauer
30 March	"Cindy, Oh Cindy"	Margot Eskens
6 April	"Cindy, Oh Cindy"	Margot Eskens
13 April	"Cindy, Oh Cindy"	Margot Eskens
20 April	"Cindy, Oh Cindy"	Margot Eskens
27 April	"Cindy, Oh Cindy"	Margot Eskens
4 May	"Cindy, Oh Cindy"	Margot Eskens
11 May	"Cindy, Oh Cindy"	Margot Eskens
18 May	"Cindy, Oh Cindy"	Margot Eskens
25 May	"Cindy, Oh Cindy"	Margot Eskens
1 June	"Cindy, Oh Cindy"	Margot Eskens
8 June	"Heimatlos"	Freddy Quinn
15 June	"Heimatlos"	Freddy Quinn
22 June	"Heimatlos"	Freddy Quinn
29 June	"Heimatlos"	Freddy Quinn
6 July	"Heimatlos"	Freddy Quinn
13 July	"Banana Boat Song"	Harry Belafonte
20 July	"Banana Boat Song"	Harry Belafonte
27 July	"Banana Boat Song"	Harry Belafonte
3 August	"Banana Boat Song"	Harry Belafonte
10 August	"Banana Boat Song"	Harry Belafonte
17 August	"Banana Boat Song"	Harry Belafonte
24 August	"Banana Boat Song"	Harry Belafonte
31 August	"Banana Boat Song"	Harry Belafonte
7 September	"Banana Boat Song"	Harry Belafonte
14 September	"Banana Boat Song"	Harry Belafonte
21 September	"Banana Boat Song"	Harry Belafonte
28 September	"Banana Boat Song"	Harry Belafonte
5 October	"Banana Boat Song"	Harry Belafonte
12 October	"Köhlerliesel"	Die Heimatsänger
19 October	"Köhlerliesel"	Die Heimatsänger
26 October	"Köhlerliesel"	Die Heimatsänger
2 November	"Köhlerliesel"	Die Heimatsänger
9 November	"Köhlerliesel"	Die Heimatsänger
16 November	"Siebenmal in der Woche"	Vico Torriani
23 November	"Siebenmal in der Woche"	Vico Torriani
30 November	"Siebenmal in der Woche"	Vico Torriani
7 December	"Siebenmal in der Woche"	Vico Torriani
14 December	"Siebenmal in der Woche"	Vico Torriani
21 December	"Wo meine Sonne scheint"	Caterina Valente
28 December	"Wo meine Sonne scheint"	Caterina Valente

== See also ==
- List of number-one hits (Germany)
