= List of number-one hits of 1963 (Germany) =

This is a list of the German Media Control Top100 Singles Chart number-ones of 1963.

Issue date	Song	Artist
5 January	"Junge, komm bald wieder"	Freddy Quinn
12 January	"Junge, komm bald wieder"	Freddy Quinn
19 January	"Junge, komm bald wieder"	Freddy Quinn
26 January	"Junge, komm bald wieder"	Freddy Quinn
2 February	"Junge, komm bald wieder"	Freddy Quinn
9 February	"Junge, komm bald wieder"	Freddy Quinn
16 February	"Junge, komm bald wieder"	Freddy Quinn
23 February	"Junge, komm bald wieder"	Freddy Quinn
2 March	"Junge, komm bald wieder"	Freddy Quinn
9 March	"Junge, komm bald wieder"	Freddy Quinn
16 March	"Junge, komm bald wieder"	Freddy Quinn
23 March	"Junge, komm bald wieder"	Freddy Quinn
30 March	"Junge, komm bald wieder"	Freddy Quinn
6 April	"Ich kauf’ mir lieber einen Tirolerhut"	Billy Mo
13 April	"Ich kauf’ mir lieber einen Tirolerhut"	Billy Mo
20 April	"Ich kauf’ mir lieber einen Tirolerhut"	Billy Mo
27 April	"Ich kauf’ mir lieber einen Tirolerhut"	Billy Mo
4 May	"Wini-Wini"	Die Tahiti-Tamourés
11 May	"Wini-Wini"	Die Tahiti-Tamourés
18 May	"Wini-Wini"	Die Tahiti-Tamourés
25 May	"Wini-Wini"	Die Tahiti-Tamourés
1 June	"Schuld war nur der Bossa Nova"	Manuela
8 June	"Schuld war nur der Bossa Nova"	Manuela
15 June	"Schuld war nur der Bossa Nova"	Manuela
22 June	"Schuld war nur der Bossa Nova"	Manuela
29 June	"Schuld war nur der Bossa Nova"	Manuela
6 July	"Barcarole in der Nacht"	Connie Francis
13 July	"Barcarole in der Nacht"	Connie Francis
20 July	"Barcarole in der Nacht"	Connie Francis
27 July	"Barcarole in der Nacht"	Connie Francis
3 August	"Ich will 'nen Cowboy als Mann"	Gitte
10 August	"Ich will 'nen Cowboy als Mann"	Gitte
17 August	"Ich will 'nen Cowboy als Mann"	Gitte
24 August	"Ich will 'nen Cowboy als Mann"	Gitte
31 August	"Ich will 'nen Cowboy als Mann"	Gitte
7 September	"Ich will 'nen Cowboy als Mann"	Gitte
14 September	"Ich will 'nen Cowboy als Mann"	Gitte
21 September	"Ich will 'nen Cowboy als Mann"	Gitte
28 September	"Ich will 'nen Cowboy als Mann"	Gitte
5 October	"Ich will 'nen Cowboy als Mann"	Gitte
12 October	"Vom Stadtpark die Laternen"	Gitte & Rex Gildo
19 October	"Vom Stadtpark die Laternen"	Gitte & Rex Gildo
26 October	"Vom Stadtpark die Laternen"	Gitte & Rex Gildo
2 November	"Vom Stadtpark die Laternen"	Gitte & Rex Gildo
9 November	"Vom Stadtpark die Laternen"	Gitte & Rex Gildo
16 November	"Vom Stadtpark die Laternen"	Gitte & Rex Gildo
23 November	"Vom Stadtpark die Laternen"	Gitte & Rex Gildo
30 November	"Vom Stadtpark die Laternen"	Gitte & Rex Gildo
7 December	"Rote Lippen soll man küssen"	Cliff Richard
14 December	"Rote Lippen soll man küssen"	Cliff Richard
21 December	"Rote Lippen soll man küssen"	Cliff Richard
28 December	"Rote Lippen soll man küssen"	Cliff Richard

== See also ==
- List of number-one hits (Germany)
