= Tyrolean hat =

Type of hat from the Alps

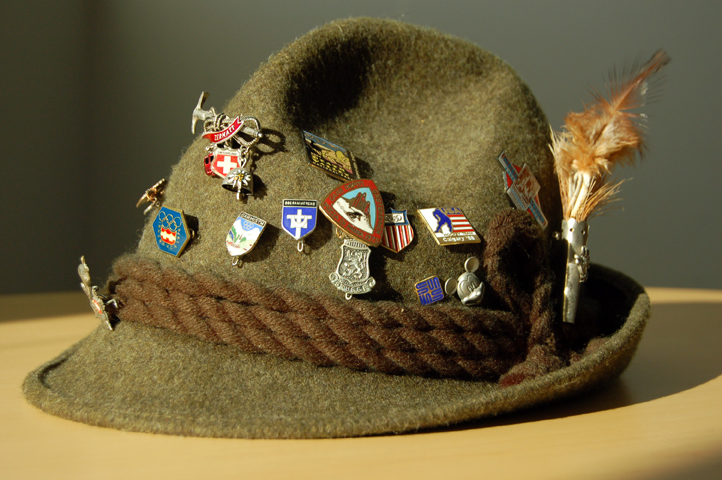
Tyrolean hat with Volksmarching pins

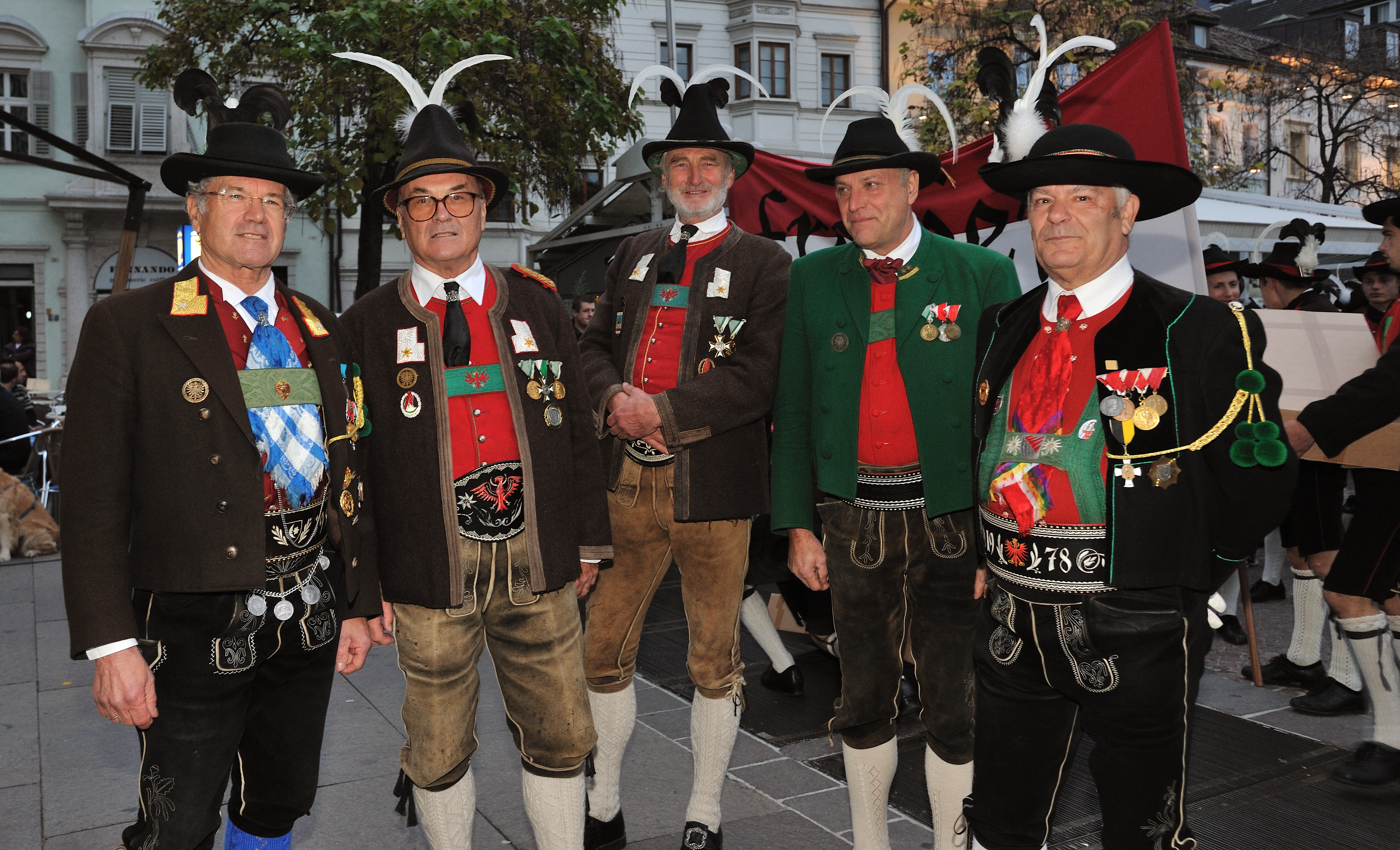
The Tyrolean Rifles wearing traditional hat styles as part of their village costume, L to R: Bolzano (Bozen), S Tyrol; Lienz, E Tyrol; Abfaltersbach, E Tyrol; Kaltern, S Tyrol; Jenesien, S Tyrol (commanders).

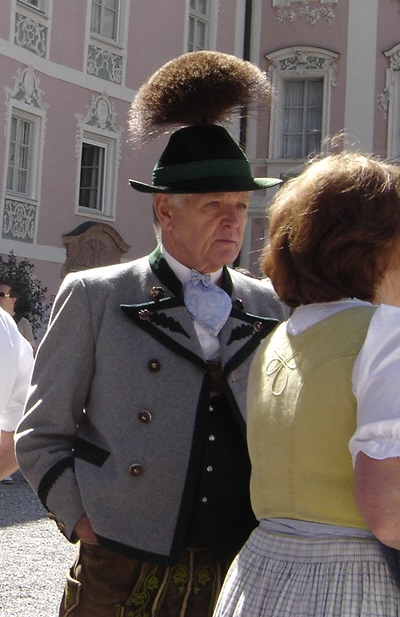
Tyrolean hat with an extravagant gamsbart plume

The Tyrolean hat (German: Tirolerhut, Italian: cappello alpino), also Tyrolese hat, Bavarian hat or Alpine hat, is a type of headwear that originally came from the Tyrol in the Alps, in what is now part of Austria, Germany, Italy and Switzerland. It is an essential and distinctive element of the local folk costume, or tracht.

== Description ==
A typical Tyrolean hat is made of green felt, which originally had a crown tapering to a point and a brim roughly the width of a hand, something that was especially common in the Zillertal, a Tyrolean valley in Austria.

In addition to varying in shape and width of brim, the hats are characteristically decorated with a coloured, corded hatband and a spray of flowers, feathers, or "brush" at the side of the crown. The traditional "brush", known as a gamsbart, is made of hair from the back of the chamois antelope. A large and showy one may contain thousands of individual hairs, and cost between $2,500 and $3,000. It takes a variety of forms, and may often be combined with feathers.

== History ==
In the 19th and 20th centuries, Tyrolean costumes developed a certain degree of uniformity in their appearance. In the local village costumes of the Tyrol, the various styles of Tyrolean hat have survived since the 1830s/1840s, albeit similar to those of contemporary fashion. These original forms vary from the tall, relatively narrow-brimmed hats of North Tyrol which were dented on top, to the small, wide-brimmed hats of the South Tyrolean wine country.

Later the Tyrolean hat became the image bearer of "Tyrolean culture" as a tourist symbol, very popular at folk gatherings and beer festivals, such as the Munich Oktoberfest, and influenced by folk music bands who wore fanciful "local" costumes. The musician, Billy Mo, wrote a song in 1962 called "Ich kauf' mir lieber einen Tirolerhut" ("I Prefer to Buy a Tyrolean Hat"), which reinforced the link between the hat and traditional Alpine (brass band) folk music. In 1965, a comedy musical appeared under the same title.

The Tyrolean hat became even better known thanks to Edward VIII of Great Britain, who, after his abdication, frequently stayed in Austrian Styria and often wore a hat of Tyrolean style, although it did not come from there. It is said that the Tyrolean hat was the inspiration for the homburg, a style popularized beyond its native Germanic region by his grandfather, Edward VII.

== Gallery ==
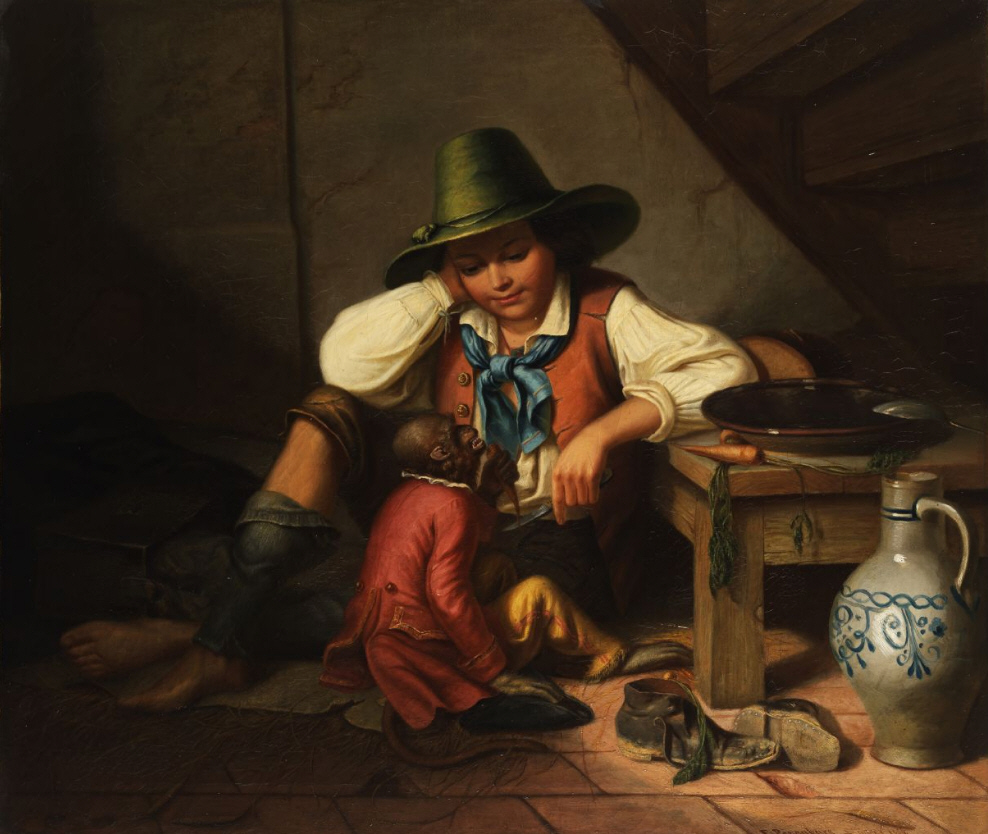
Boy with Tyrolean hat and monkey (Knabe mit Tirolerhut und Äffchen). Oil on canvas, c. 1834

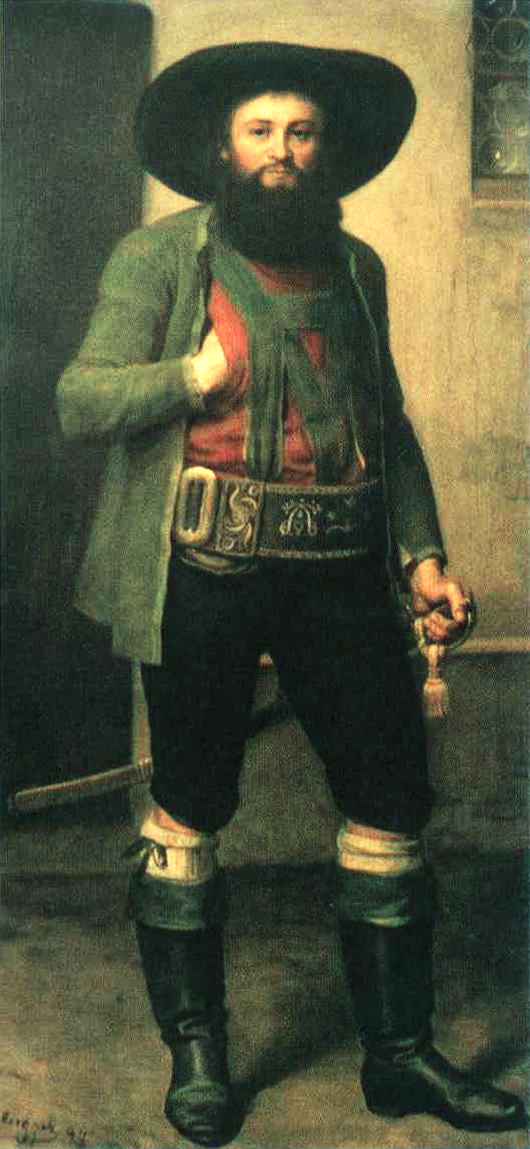
Andreas Hofer, wearing the typical, broad-brimmed flat hat of the South Tyrolean type (posthumous portrait, mid-19th century)

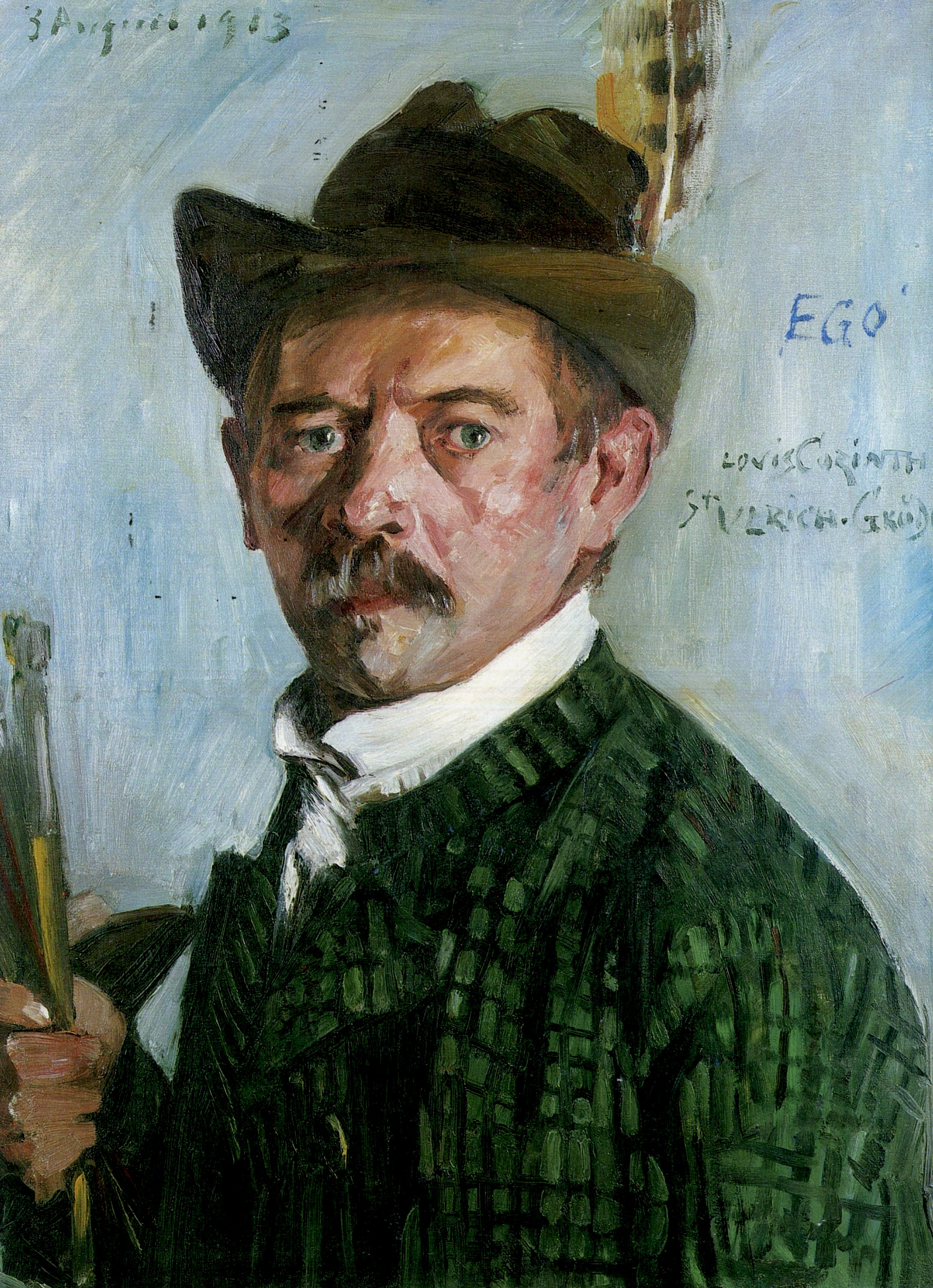
Self portrait with Tyrolean hat (Selbstporträt mit Tiroler Hut), Lovis Corinth

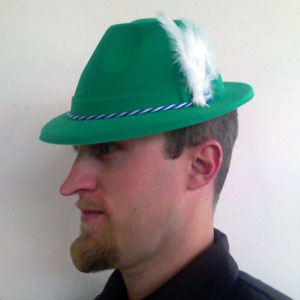
Simple, party version of the Tyrolean hat

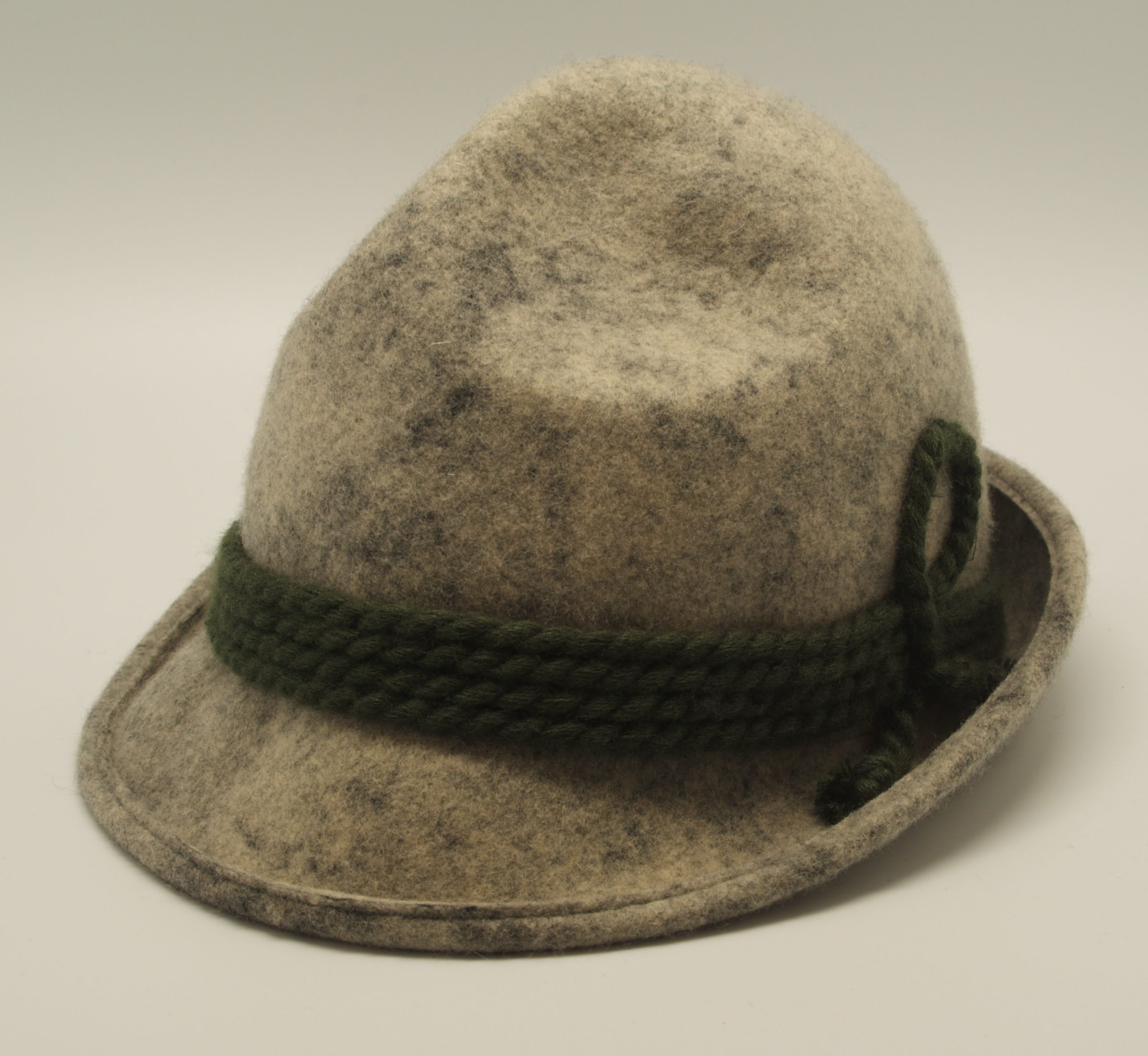
Grey variant of the Tyrolean hat

== See also ==
- List of hat styles
- Campaign hat
- Seppel, the figure with a Seppelhut hat, the Bavarian-North Tyrolean felt cap with or without a brim
