= List of number-one hits of 1967 (Germany) =

This is a list of the German Media Control Top100 Singles Chart number-ones of 1967.

Issue date	Song	Artist
7 January	"Dandy"	The Kinks
14 January	"Dandy"	The Kinks
21 January	"Good Night My Love"	Roy Black
28 January	"Good Night My Love"	Roy Black
4 February	"I'm a Believer"	The Monkees
11 February	"I'm a Believer"	The Monkees
18 February	"I'm a Believer"	The Monkees
25 February	"I'm a Believer"	The Monkees
4 March	"I'm a Believer"	The Monkees
11 March	"I'm a Believer"	The Monkees
18 March	"Dear Mrs. Applebee"	David Garrick
25 March	"Dear Mrs. Applebee"	David Garrick
1 April	"Let's Spend the Night Together"	The Rolling Stones
8 April	"Let's Spend the Night Together"	The Rolling Stones
15 April	"Let's Spend the Night Together"	The Rolling Stones
22 April	"Let's Spend the Night Together"	The Rolling Stones
29 April	"Let's Spend the Night Together"	The Rolling Stones
6 May	"Penny Lane"	The Beatles
13 May	"Penny Lane"	The Beatles
20 May	"Puppet on a String"	Sandie Shaw
27 May	"Puppet on a String"	Sandie Shaw
3 June	"Puppet on a String"	Sandie Shaw
10 June	"Puppet on a String"	Sandie Shaw
17 June	"Puppet on a String"	Sandie Shaw
24 June	"Puppet on a String"	Sandie Shaw
1 July	"Puppet on a String"	Sandie Shaw
8 July	"Puppet on a String"	Sandie Shaw
15 July	"Ha! Ha! Said the Clown"	Manfred Mann
22 July	"Ha! Ha! Said the Clown"	Manfred Mann
29 July	"Meine Liebe zu dir"	Roy Black
5 August	"A Whiter Shade of Pale"	Procol Harum
12 August	"A Whiter Shade of Pale"	Procol Harum
19 August	"All You Need is Love"	The Beatles
26 August	"All You Need is Love"	The Beatles
2 September	"All You Need is Love"	The Beatles
9 September	"All You Need is Love"	The Beatles
16 September	"All You Need is Love"	The Beatles
23 September	"All You Need is Love"	The Beatles
30 September	"Verbotene Träume"	Peter Alexander
7 October	"San Francisco (Be Sure to Wear Flowers in Your Hair)"	Scott McKenzie
14 October	"San Francisco (Be Sure to Wear Flowers in Your Hair)"	Scott McKenzie
21 October	"San Francisco (Be Sure to Wear Flowers in Your Hair)"	Scott McKenzie
28 October	"San Francisco (Be Sure to Wear Flowers in Your Hair)"	Scott McKenzie
4 November	"San Francisco (Be Sure to Wear Flowers in Your Hair)"	Scott McKenzie
11 November	"San Francisco (Be Sure to Wear Flowers in Your Hair)"	Scott McKenzie
18 November	"Romeo und Julia"	Peggy March
25 November	"Massachusetts"	Bee Gees
2 December	"Massachusetts"	Bee Gees
9 December	"Massachusetts"	Bee Gees
16 December	"Massachusetts"	Bee Gees
23 December	"Massachusetts"	Bee Gees
30 December	"Massachusetts"	Bee Gees

== See also ==
- List of number-one hits (Germany)
