= List of German singles chart number ones of the 1950s =

Musikmarkt (contemporary logo) began to issue record charts in June 1959 and is considered the official predecessor of the current irratiation of the charts.

The first attempt to tabulate the most popular singles in West Germany was made by the magazine Der Automatenmarkt. The publication began to track jukebox data in late 1953 and listed "Es hängt ein Pferdehalfter an der Wand" as the most played song of December 1953 in the January 1954 issue.

In April, the magazine issued its first full monthly chart. "Wir, wir, wir haben ein Klavier" by Zehn Whiskys und ein Soda was the first song to top the single chart. By 1959, Musikmarkt began to tabulate German record charts based on jukebox plays, physical sales, airplay data and sheet music sales. GfK Entertainment considers the Musikmarkt charts as its sole predecessor. The first number-one on the Musikmarkt Hit-Parade was "Die Gitarre und das Meer" by Austrian singer Freddy Quinn. The song furthermore finished as the years best-performing song.

== Number-one singles ==
=== Der Automatenmarkt ===
No.	Artist	Title	Tracking month	Months at number one
1954
1	Zehn Whiskys und ein Soda	"Wir, wir, wir haben ein Klavier"	March 1954	2
2	Lys Assia, Fred Weyrich and Die Peheiros	"Schweden-Mädel"	May 1954	1
3	Friedel Hensch und die Cyprys	"Heidenröslein"	June 1954	3
4	Hans-Arno Simon	"Wodka-Fox (Gib mir den Wodka, Anuschka)"	September 1954	2
5	Werner Dies and Willy Berking	"Schuster, bleib’ bei deinen Leisten"	November 1954	1
6	Kurt-Adolf Thelen, Sunshine-Quartett, Karl Golgowsky and Will Glahé	"Am 30. Mai ist der Weltuntergang"	December 1954	1
1955
7	Hula Hawaiian Quartett	"Jim, Jonny und Jonas"	January 1955	2
8	Caterina Valente	"Ganz Paris träumt von der Liebe"	March 1955	5
9	Bibi Johns	"Die Gipsy-Band (Polly-Dolly-do)"	August 1955	2
10	Silvio Francesco and Fausto Campi und die Leonardos	"He Mr. Banjo"	October 1955	1
11	Hilo Hawaiians	"Domingo Santo Domingo"	November 1955	1
12	Lys Assia	"Arrivederci, Roma"	December 1955	1
1956
13	Bill Haley & His Comets	"Rock Around the Clock"	January 1956	2
re	Lys Assia	"Arrivederci, Roma"	March 1956	2
14	Club Indonesia	"Steig in das Traumboot der Liebe"	April 1956	2
15	Freddy Quinn	"Heimweh"	June 1956	5
16	Die Sieben Raben	"Smoky"	November 1956	2
1957
17	Rodgers-Gesangs-Duett	"Sei zufrieden"	January 1957	1
18	Margot Eskens & Wolfgang Sauer	"Cindy, Oh Cindy"	February 1957	1
18	Margot Eskens	"Cindy, Oh Cindy"	March 1957	4
19	Harry Belafonte	"Day-O (The Banana Boat Song)"	July 1957	3
20	Die Heimatsänger	"Köhlerliesel"	October 1957	1
21	Vico Torriani	"Siebenmal in der Woche"	November 1957	1
22	Caterina Valente	"Wo meine Sonne scheint"	December 1957	1
1958
23	Fred Bertelmann	"Der lachende Vagabund"	January 1958	3
24	Mitch Miller	"The River Kwai March & Colonel Bogey March"	April 1958	3
25	Billy Vaughn & his Orchestra	"Sail Along, Silv'ry Moon"	July 1958	3
26	Pérez Prado	"Patricia"	October 1958	1
27	Billy Vaughn	"La Paloma"	November 1958	3
1959
28	Nilsen Brothers	"Tom Dooley"	February 1959	1
29	The Kingston Trio	"Tom Dooley"	March 1959	1
30	Freddy Quinn	"Die Gitarre und das Meer"	April 1959	4

=== Musikmarkt ===
Key
†	Best-performing single of the year

No.	Artist	Title	Tracking month	Months at number one
1959
1	Freddy Quinn	"Die Gitarre und das Meer" †	June 1959	2
2	Dalida	"Am Tag, als der Regen kam"	August 1959	2
3	Bill Ramsey	"Souvenirs"	October 1959	1
4	Freddy Quinn	"Unter fremden Sternen"	November 1959	1
5	Rocco Granata	"Marina"	December 1959	1
5	Will Brandes	"Marina"	December 1959	1
