= List of number-one hits of 1956 (Germany) =

This is a list of the German Media Control Top100 Singles Chart number-ones of 1956.

Issue date	Song	Artist
7 January	"Der Mond hält seine Wacht"	Peter Alexander
14 January	"Der Mond hält seine Wacht"	Peter Alexander
21 January	"Der Mond hält seine Wacht"	Peter Alexander
28 January	"Der Mond hält seine Wacht"	Peter Alexander
4 February	"Der Mond hält seine Wacht"	Peter Alexander
11 February	"Eventuell, eventuell"	Peter Alexander & Caterina Valente
18 February	"Eventuell, eventuell"	Peter Alexander & Caterina Valente
25 February	"Eventuell, eventuell"	Peter Alexander & Caterina Valente
3 March	"Eventuell, eventuell"	Peter Alexander & Caterina Valente
10 March	"Eventuell, eventuell"	Peter Alexander & Caterina Valente
17 March	"Eventuell, eventuell"	Peter Alexander & Caterina Valente
24 March	"Eventuell, eventuell"	Peter Alexander & Caterina Valente
31 March	"Tiritomba"	Margot Eskens
7 April	"Tiritomba"	Margot Eskens
14 April	"Tiritomba"	Margot Eskens
21 April	"Tiritomba"	Margot Eskens
28 April	"Tiritomba"	Margot Eskens
5 May	"Tiritomba"	Margot Eskens
12 May	"Tiritomba"	Margot Eskens
19 May	"Steig in das Traumboot der Liebe"	Caterina Valente & Silvio Francesco as Club Indonesia
26 May	"Steig in das Traumboot der Liebe"	Caterina Valente & Silvio Francesco as Club Indonesia
2 June	"Steig in das Traumboot der Liebe"	Caterina Valente & Silvio Francesco as Club Indonesia
9 June	"Steig in das Traumboot der Liebe"	Caterina Valente & Silvio Francesco as Club Indonesia
16 June	"Steig in das Traumboot der Liebe"	Caterina Valente & Silvio Francesco as Club Indonesia
23 June	"Steig in das Traumboot der Liebe"	Caterina Valente & Silvio Francesco as Club Indonesia
30 June	"Rock Around the Clock"	Bill Haley & His Comets
7 July	"Rock Around the Clock"	Bill Haley & His Comets
14 July	"Rock Around the Clock"	Bill Haley & His Comets
21 July	"Rock Around the Clock"	Bill Haley & His Comets
28 July	"Heimweh"	Freddy Quinn
4 August	"Heimweh"	Freddy Quinn
11 August	"Heimweh"	Freddy Quinn
18 August	"Heimweh"	Freddy Quinn
25 August	"Heimweh"	Freddy Quinn
1 September	"Heimweh"	Freddy Quinn
8 September	"Heimweh"	Freddy Quinn
15 September	"Heimweh"	Freddy Quinn
22 September	"Heimweh"	Freddy Quinn
29 September	"Heimweh"	Freddy Quinn
6 October	"Heimweh"	Freddy Quinn
13 October	"Heimweh"	Freddy Quinn
20 October	"Heimweh"	Freddy Quinn
27 October	"Heimweh"	Freddy Quinn
3 November	"Rosalie"	Freddy Quinn
10 November	"Rosalie"	Freddy Quinn
17 November	"Rosalie"	Freddy Quinn
24 November	"Smoky"	Die Sieben Raben
1 December	"Smoky"	Die Sieben Raben
8 December	"Smoky"	Die Sieben Raben
15 December	"Smoky"	Die Sieben Raben
22 December	"Smoky"	Die Sieben Raben
29 December	"Smoky"	Die Sieben Raben

== See also ==
- List of number-one hits (Germany)
