= List of number-one hits of 1996 (Germany) =

This is a list of the German Media Control Top100 Singles Chart number-ones of 1996.

== Number-one hits by week ==
Key
†	Indicates best-performing single and album of 1996

Issue date	Song	Artist	Ref.	Album	Artist	Ref.
1 January	No release (Note: Same issue as for 25 December 1995.)					
8 January	"Earth Song"	Michael Jackson		Made In Heaven	Queen	
15 January	"Earth Song"	Michael Jackson		Made In Heaven	Queen	
22 January	"Gangsta's Paradise"	Coolio featuring L.V.		Made In Heaven	Queen	
29 January	"Gangsta's Paradise"	Coolio featuring L.V.		Made In Heaven	Queen	
5 February	"Missing (Todd Terry Remix)"	Everything but the Girl		Made In Heaven	Queen	
12 February	"Missing (Todd Terry Remix)"	Everything but the Girl		Opium fürs Volk	Die Toten Hosen	
19 February	"Spaceman"	Babylon Zoo		Opium fürs Volk	Die Toten Hosen	
26 February	"Lemon Tree"	Fools Garden		Opium fürs Volk	Die Toten Hosen	
4 March	"Lemon Tree"	Fools Garden		Opium fürs Volk	Die Toten Hosen	
11 March	"Lemon Tree"	Fools Garden		Dish of the Day	Fool's Garden	
18 March	"Lemon Tree"	Fools Garden		Sechsundneunzig	Peter Maffay	
25 March	"Children"	Robert Miles		Sechsundneunzig	Peter Maffay	
1 April	"Children"	Robert Miles		Sechsundneunzig	Peter Maffay	
8 April	"Children"	Robert Miles		Greatest Hits	Take That	
15 April	"Children"	Robert Miles		Greatest Hits	Take That	
22 April	"Children"	Robert Miles		Greatest Hits	Take That	
29 April	"Children"	Robert Miles		Greatest Hits	Take That	
6 May	"Children"	Robert Miles		Greatest Hits	Take That	
13 May	"They Don't Care About Us"	Michael Jackson		Greatest Hits	Take That	
20 May	"They Don't Care About Us"	Michael Jackson		Backstreet Boys	Backstreet Boys	
27 May	"They Don't Care About Us"	Michael Jackson		Backstreet Boys	Backstreet Boys	
3 June	"Macarena"	Los del Rio		Dove c'è musica	Eros Ramazotti	
10 June	"Macarena"	Los del Rio		Dove c'è musica	Eros Ramazotti	
17 June	"Macarena"	Los del Rio		Load	Metallica	
24 June	"Macarena"	Los del Rio		Load	Metallica	
1 July	"Killing Me Softly" †	The Fugees		Load	Metallica	
8 July	"Killing Me Softly" †	The Fugees		Load	Metallica	
15 July	"Killing Me Softly" †	The Fugees		The Score †	The Fugees	
22 July	"Killing Me Softly" †	The Fugees		The Score †	The Fugees	
29 July	"Killing Me Softly" †	The Fugees		The Score †	The Fugees	
5 August	"Killing Me Softly" †	The Fugees		The Score †	The Fugees	
12 August	"Killing Me Softly" †	The Fugees		The Score †	The Fugees	
19 August	"Killing Me Softly" †	The Fugees		The Score †	The Fugees	
26 August	"I Can't Help Myself"	The Kelly Family		The Score †	The Fugees	
2 September	"Killing Me Softly" †	The Fugees		Live - Die Zweite	Pur	
9 September	"I Can't Help Myself"	The Kelly Family		Live - Die Zweite	Pur	
16 September	"Wannabe"	Spice Girls		Live - Die Zweite	Pur	
23 September	"Wannabe"	Spice Girls		Live - Die Zweite	Pur	
30 September	"Wannabe"	Spice Girls		Live - Die Zweite	Pur	
7 October	"Wannabe"	Spice Girls		New Adventures in Hi-Fi	R.E.M.	
14 October	"Zehn kleine Jägermeister"	Die Toten Hosen		New Adventures in Hi-Fi	R.E.M.	
21 October	"Zehn kleine Jägermeister"	Die Toten Hosen		Alles	Wolfgang Petry	
28 October	"Zehn kleine Jägermeister"	Die Toten Hosen		Dance Into the Light	Phil Collins	
4 November	"Zehn kleine Jägermeister"	Die Toten Hosen		Dance Into the Light	Phil Collins	
11 November	"Quit Playing Games (With My Heart)"	Backstreet Boys		Almost Heaven	The Kelly Family	
18 November	"Quit Playing Games (With My Heart)"	Backstreet Boys		Almost Heaven	The Kelly Family	
25 November	"Quit Playing Games (With My Heart)"	Backstreet Boys		Almost Heaven	The Kelly Family	
2 December	"Quit Playing Games (With My Heart)"	Backstreet Boys		Almost Heaven	The Kelly Family	
9 December	"Verpiss' dich"	Tic Tac Toe		Almost Heaven	The Kelly Family	
16 December	"Time to Say Goodbye"	Andrea Bocelli and Sarah Brightman		Almost Heaven	The Kelly Family	
23 December	"Time to Say Goodbye"	Andrea Bocelli and Sarah Brightman		Bocelli	Andrea Bocelli	
30 December	No release (Note: Same issue as for 23 December.)					

== See also ==
- List of number-one hits (Germany)
