= List of number-one hits of 1958 (Germany) =

This is a list of the German Media Control Top100 Singles Chart number-ones of 1958.

Issue date	Song	Artist
4 January	"Wo meine Sonne scheint"	Caterina Valente
11 January	"Wo meine Sonne scheint"	Caterina Valente
18 January	"Wo meine Sonne scheint"	Caterina Valente
25 January	"Der lachende Vagabund"	Fred Bertelmann
1 February	"Der lachende Vagabund"	Fred Bertelmann
8 February	"Der lachende Vagabund"	Fred Bertelmann
15 February	"Der lachende Vagabund"	Fred Bertelmann
22 February	"Der lachende Vagabund"	Fred Bertelmann
29 February	"Der lachende Vagabund"	Fred Bertelmann
8 March	"Der lachende Vagabund"	Fred Bertelmann
15 March	"Der lachende Vagabund"	Fred Bertelmann
22 March	"Der lachende Vagabund"	Fred Bertelmann
29 March	"Der lachende Vagabund"	Fred Bertelmann
5 April	"Der lachende Vagabund"	Fred Bertelmann
12 April	"River Kwai March"	Mitch Miller
19 April	"River Kwai March"	Mitch Miller
26 April	"River Kwai March"	Mitch Miller
3 May	"River Kwai March"	Mitch Miller
10 May	"River Kwai March"	Mitch Miller
17 May	"River Kwai March"	Mitch Miller
24 May	"River Kwai March"	Mitch Miller
31 May	"River Kwai March"	Mitch Miller
7 June	"River Kwai March"	Mitch Miller
14 June	"River Kwai March"	Mitch Miller
21 June	"River Kwai March"	Mitch Miller
28 June	"River Kwai March"	Mitch Miller
5 July	"River Kwai March"	Mitch Miller
12 July	"Sail Along Silvery Moon"	Billy Vaughn
19 July	"Sail Along Silvery Moon"	Billy Vaughn
26 July	"Sail Along Silvery Moon"	Billy Vaughn
2 August	"Sail Along Silvery Moon"	Billy Vaughn
9 August	"Sail Along Silvery Moon"	Billy Vaughn
16 August	"Sail Along Silvery Moon"	Billy Vaughn
23 August	"Sail Along Silvery Moon"	Billy Vaughn
30 August	"Sail Along Silvery Moon"	Billy Vaughn
6 September	"Sail Along Silvery Moon"	Billy Vaughn
13 September	"Sail Along Silvery Moon"	Billy Vaughn
20 September	"Der Legionär"	Freddy Quinn
27 September	"Der Legionär"	Freddy Quinn
4 October	"Der Legionär"	Freddy Quinn
11 October	"Hula Baby"	Peter Kraus
18 October	"Patricia"	Pérez Prado
25 October	"Patricia"	Pérez Prado
1 November	"Patricia"	Pérez Prado
8 November	"Ich bin bald wieder hier"	Freddy Quinn
15 November	"Ich bin bald wieder hier"	Freddy Quinn
22 November	"La Paloma"	Billy Vaughn
29 November	"La Paloma"	Billy Vaughn
6 December	"La Paloma"	Billy Vaughn
13 December	"La Paloma"	Billy Vaughn
20 December	"La Paloma"	Billy Vaughn
27 December	"La Paloma"	Billy Vaughn

== See also ==
- List of number-one hits (Germany)
