= List of number-one hits of 1995 (Germany) =

This is a list of the German Media Control Top100 Singles Chart number-ones of 1995.

== Number-one hits by week ==
Key
†	Indicates best-performing single and album of 1995

Issue date	Song	Artist	Ref.	Album	Artist	Ref.
2 January	"Cotton Eye Joe"	Rednex		Over The Hump†	The Kelly Family	
9 January	"Cotton Eye Joe"	Rednex		Over The Hump†	The Kelly Family	
16 January	"Tears Don't Lie"	Mark 'Oh		No Need To Argue	The Cranberries	
23 January	"Tears Don't Lie"	Mark 'Oh		No Need To Argue	The Cranberries	
30 January	"Tears Don't Lie"	Mark 'Oh		No Need To Argue	The Cranberries	
6 February	"Zombie"	The Cranberries		No Need To Argue	The Cranberries	
13 February	"Conquest of Paradise"†	Vangelis		No Need To Argue	The Cranberries	
20 February	"Conquest of Paradise"†	Vangelis		No Need To Argue	The Cranberries	
27 February	"Conquest of Paradise"†	Vangelis		1492: Conquest of Paradise	Vangelis	
6 March	"Conquest of Paradise"†	Vangelis		1492: Conquest of Paradise	Vangelis	
13 March	"Conquest of Paradise"†	Vangelis		1492: Conquest of Paradise	Vangelis	
20 March	"Conquest of Paradise"†	Vangelis		1492: Conquest of Paradise	Vangelis	
27 March	"Conquest of Paradise"†	Vangelis		Greatest Hits	Bruce Springsteen	
3 April	"Conquest of Paradise"†	Vangelis		Greatest Hits	Bruce Springsteen	
10 April	"Conquest of Paradise"†	Vangelis		Greatest Hits	Bruce Springsteen	
17 April	"Conquest of Paradise"†	Vangelis		Greatest Hits	Bruce Springsteen	
24 April	"Conquest of Paradise"†	Vangelis		Greatest Hits	Bruce Springsteen	
1 May	"Back for Good"	Take That		Greatest Hits	Bruce Springsteen	
8 May	"Back for Good"	Take That		Greatest Hits	Bruce Springsteen	
15 May	"Back for Good"	Take That		Nobody Else	Take That	
22 May	"Back for Good"	Take That		Lieder, die die Welt nicht braucht	Die Doofen	
29 May	"Be My Lover"	La Bouche		Lieder, die die Welt nicht braucht	Die Doofen	
5 June	"Be My Lover"	La Bouche		Lieder, die die Welt nicht braucht	Die Doofen	
12 June	"Be My Lover"	La Bouche		Lieder, die die Welt nicht braucht	Die Doofen	
19 June	"Be My Lover"	La Bouche		Lieder, die die Welt nicht braucht	Die Doofen	
26 June	"Mief!"	Die Doofen		Lieder, die die Welt nicht braucht	Die Doofen	
3 July	"Wish You Were Here"	Rednex		HIStory: Past, Present and Future, Book I	Michael Jackson	
10 July	"Wish You Were Here"	Rednex		HIStory: Past, Present and Future, Book I	Michael Jackson	
17 July	"Wish You Were Here"	Rednex		These Days	Bon Jovi	
24 July	"Wish You Were Here"	Rednex		These Days	Bon Jovi	
31 July	"Wish You Were Here"	Rednex		These Days	Bon Jovi	
7 August	"Wish You Were Here"	Rednex		Tekkno ist cool - vol. 1	Die Schlümpfe	
14 August	"Scatman's World"	Scatman John		Tekkno ist cool - vol. 1	Die Schlümpfe	
21 August	"Scatman's World"	Scatman John		Tekkno ist cool - vol. 1	Die Schlümpfe	
28 August	"Scatman's World"	Scatman John		Tekkno ist cool - vol. 1	Die Schlümpfe	
4 September	"Boom Boom Boom"	The Outhere Brothers		Abenteuerland	Pur	
11 September	"Boom Boom Boom"	The Outhere Brothers		Abenteuerland	Pur	
18 September	"Boom Boom Boom"	The Outhere Brothers		Abenteuerland	Pur	
25 September	"I Wanna Be a Hippy"	Technohead		Abenteuerland	Pur	
2 October	"I Wanna Be a Hippy"	Technohead		Abenteuerland	Pur	
9 October	"Sie ist Weg"	Die Fantastischen Vier		Abenteuerland	Pur	
16 October	"Sie ist Weg"	Die Fantastischen Vier		Abenteuerland	Pur	
23 October	"Sie ist Weg"	Die Fantastischen Vier		Life	Simply Red	
30 October	"Gangsta's Paradise"	Coolio featuring L.V.		Life	Simply Red	
6 November	"Gangsta's Paradise"	Coolio featuring L.V.		Daydream	Mariah Carey	
13 November	"Gangsta's Paradise"	Coolio featuring L.V.		Life	Simply Red	
20 November	"Gangsta's Paradise"	Coolio featuring L.V.		Made In Heaven	Queen	
27 November	"Gangsta's Paradise"	Coolio featuring L.V.		Made In Heaven	Queen	
4 December	"Gangsta's Paradise"	Coolio featuring L.V.		Anthology 1	The Beatles	
11 December	"Earth Song"	Michael Jackson		Made In Heaven	Queen	
18 December	"Earth Song"	Michael Jackson		Made In Heaven	Queen	
25 December	"Earth Song"	Michael Jackson		Made In Heaven	Queen	

== See also ==
- List of number-one hits (Germany)
