= List of number-one hits of 1978 (Germany) =

This is a list of the German Media Control Top100 Singles Chart number-ones of 1978.

Issue date	Song	Artist
2 January	"Don't Let Me Be Misunderstood"	Santa Esmeralda
9 January	"Don't Let Me Be Misunderstood"	Santa Esmeralda
16 January	"Mull of Kintyre"	Wings
23 January	"Mull of Kintyre"	Wings
30 January	"Mull of Kintyre"	Wings
6 February	"Mull of Kintyre"	Wings
13 February	"Mull of Kintyre"	Wings
20 February	"Mull of Kintyre"	Wings
27 February	"Mull of Kintyre"	Wings
6 March	"Mull of Kintyre"	Wings
13 March	"Mull of Kintyre"	Wings
20 March	"Mull of Kintyre"	Wings
27 March	"Das Lied der Schlümpfe"	Vader Abraham & Die Schlümpfe
3 April	"Das Lied der Schlümpfe"	Vader Abraham & Die Schlümpfe
10 April	"Das Lied der Schlümpfe"	Vader Abraham & Die Schlümpfe
17 April	"Das Lied der Schlümpfe"	Vader Abraham & Die Schlümpfe
24 April	"Rivers of Babylon"	Boney M.
1 May	"Rivers of Babylon"	Boney M.
8 May	"Rivers of Babylon"	Boney M.
15 May	"Rivers of Babylon"	Boney M.
22 May	"Rivers of Babylon"	Boney M.
29 May	"Rivers of Babylon"	Boney M.
5 June	"Rivers of Babylon"	Boney M.
12 June	"Rivers of Babylon"	Boney M.
19 June	"Rivers of Babylon"	Boney M.
26 June	"Rivers of Babylon"	Boney M.
3 July	"Rivers of Babylon"	Boney M.
10 July	"Rivers of Babylon"	Boney M.
17 July	"Rivers of Babylon"	Boney M.
24 July	"Rivers of Babylon"	Boney M.
31 July	"Rivers of Babylon"	Boney M.
7 August	"Rivers of Babylon"	Boney M.
14 August	"You're the One That I Want"	John Travolta & Olivia Newton-John
21 August	"Rivers of Babylon"	Boney M.
28 August	"You're the One That I Want"	John Travolta & Olivia Newton-John
4 September	"You're the One That I Want"	John Travolta & Olivia Newton-John
11 September	"Dancing in the City"	Marshall Hain
18 September	"You're the One That I Want"	John Travolta & Olivia Newton-John
25 September	"You're the One That I Want"	John Travolta & Olivia Newton-John
2 October	"You're the One That I Want"	John Travolta & Olivia Newton-John
9 October	"Rasputin"	Boney M.
16 October	"Mexican Girl"	Smokie
23 October	"Substitute"	Clout
30 October	"Substitute"	Clout
6 November	"Substitute"	Clout
13 November	"You're the Greatest Lover"	Luv'
20 November	"You're the Greatest Lover"	Luv'
27 November	"You're the Greatest Lover"	Luv'
4 December	"You're the Greatest Lover"	Luv'
11 December	"Y.M.C.A."	Village People
18 December	"Y.M.C.A."	Village People
25 December	"Y.M.C.A."	Village People

== See also ==
- List of number-one hits (Germany)
