= List of number-one hits of 1964 (Germany) =

This is a list of the German Media Control Top100 Singles Chart number-ones of 1964.

Issue date	Song	Artist
4 January	"Rote Lippen soll man küssen"	Cliff Richard
11 January	"Rote Lippen soll man küssen"	Cliff Richard
18 January	"Rote Lippen soll man küssen"	Cliff Richard
25 January	"Das kannst du mir nicht verbieten"	Bernd Spier
1 February	"Das kannst du mir nicht verbieten"	Bernd Spier
8 February	"Das kannst du mir nicht verbieten"	Bernd Spier
15 February	"Das kannst du mir nicht verbieten"	Bernd Spier
22 February	"Das kannst du mir nicht verbieten"	Bernd Spier
29 February	"I Want to Hold Your Hand"	The Beatles
7 March	"I Want to Hold Your Hand"	The Beatles
14 March	"I Want to Hold Your Hand"	The Beatles
21 March	"I Want to Hold Your Hand"	The Beatles
28 March	"I Want to Hold Your Hand"	The Beatles
4 April	"I Want to Hold Your Hand"	The Beatles
11 April	"I Want to Hold Your Hand"	The Beatles
18 April	"I Want to Hold Your Hand"	The Beatles
25 April	"Oh My Darling Caroline"	Ronny
2 May	"Oh My Darling Caroline"	Ronny
9 May	"Oh My Darling Caroline"	Ronny
16 May	"Oh My Darling Caroline"	Ronny
23 May	"Oh My Darling Caroline"	Ronny
30 May	"Oh My Darling Caroline"	Ronny
6 June	"Oh My Darling Caroline"	Ronny
13 June	"Oh My Darling Caroline"	Ronny
20 June	"Shake Hands"	Drafi Deutscher
27 June	"Shake Hands"	Drafi Deutscher
4 July	"Liebeskummer lohnt sich nicht"	Siw Malmkvist
11 July	"Liebeskummer lohnt sich nicht"	Siw Malmkvist
18 July	"Liebeskummer lohnt sich nicht"	Siw Malmkvist
25 July	"Liebeskummer lohnt sich nicht"	Siw Malmkvist
1 August	"Liebeskummer lohnt sich nicht"	Siw Malmkvist
8 August	"Liebeskummer lohnt sich nicht"	Siw Malmkvist
15 August	"Liebeskummer lohnt sich nicht"	Siw Malmkvist
22 August	"Liebeskummer lohnt sich nicht"	Siw Malmkvist
29 August	"Liebeskummer lohnt sich nicht"	Siw Malmkvist
5 September	"Liebeskummer lohnt sich nicht"	Siw Malmkvist
12 September	"Das kommt vom Rudern, das kommt vom Segeln"	Peter Lauch & Die Regenpfeifer
19 September	"Das kommt vom Rudern, das kommt vom Segeln"	Peter Lauch & Die Regenpfeifer
26 September	"Das kommt vom Rudern, das kommt vom Segeln"	Peter Lauch & Die Regenpfeifer
3 October	"Das kommt vom Rudern, das kommt vom Segeln"	Peter Lauch & Die Regenpfeifer
10 October	"Das kommt vom Rudern, das kommt vom Segeln"	Peter Lauch & Die Regenpfeifer
17 October	"Das kommt vom Rudern, das kommt vom Segeln"	Peter Lauch & Die Regenpfeifer
24 October	"Memphis Tennessee"	Johnny Rivers
24 October	"Memphis Tennessee" (equal top)	Bernd Spier
31 October	"Memphis Tennessee"	Johnny Rivers
31 October	"Memphis Tennessee"	Bernd Spier
7 November	"Memphis Tennessee"	Johnny Rivers
7 November	"Memphis Tennessee"	Bernd Spier
14 November	"Memphis Tennessee"	Johnny Rivers
14 November	"Memphis Tennessee"	Bernd Spier
21 November	"Memphis Tennessee"	Johnny Rivers
21 November	"Memphis Tennessee"	Bernd Spier
28 November	"Memphis Tennessee"	Johnny Rivers
28 November	"Memphis Tennessee"	Bernd Spier
5 December	"Memphis Tennessee"	Johnny Rivers
5 December	"Memphis Tennessee"	Bernd Spier
12 December	"Memphis Tennessee"	Johnny Rivers
12 December	"Memphis Tennessee"	Bernd Spier
19 December	"Oh, Pretty Woman"	Roy Orbison
26 December	"Oh, Pretty Woman"	Roy Orbison

== See also ==
- List of number-one hits (Germany)
