= List of number-one hits of 1989 (Germany) =

This is a list of the German Media Control Top100 Singles Chart number-ones of 1989

Key
†	Indicates best-performing single and album of 1989

Issue date	Song	Artist	Album	Artist
2 January	No release (Note: Same issue as for 26 December 1988.)			
9 January	"Don't Worry, Be Happy"	Bobby McFerrin	Pop Goes Classic	Munich Symphony Orchestra
16 January	"First Time"	Robin Beck	Pop Goes Classic	Munich Symphony Orchestra
23 January	"First Time"	Robin Beck	Ancient Heart †	Tanita Tikaram
30 January	"First Time"	Robin Beck	Ancient Heart †	Tanita Tikaram
6 February	"First Time"	Robin Beck	Ancient Heart †	Tanita Tikaram
13 February	"First Time"	Robin Beck	Ancient Heart †	Tanita Tikaram
20 February	"First Time"	Robin Beck	Ancient Heart †	Tanita Tikaram
27 February	"First Time"	Robin Beck	Ancient Heart †	Tanita Tikaram
6 March	"Something's Gotten Hold of My Heart"	Marc Almond featuring Gene Pitney	Ancient Heart †	Tanita Tikaram
13 March	"Something's Gotten Hold of My Heart"	Marc Almond featuring Gene Pitney	Ancient Heart †	Tanita Tikaram
20 March	"Something's Gotten Hold of My Heart"	Marc Almond featuring Gene Pitney	Ancient Heart †	Tanita Tikaram
27 March	"Something's Gotten Hold of My Heart"	Marc Almond featuring Gene Pitney	Ancient Heart †	Tanita Tikaram
3 April	"Looking for Freedom" †	David Hasselhoff	Ancient Heart †	Tanita Tikaram
10 April	"Looking for Freedom" †	David Hasselhoff	Ancient Heart †	Tanita Tikaram
17 April	"Looking for Freedom" †	David Hasselhoff	Like a Prayer	Madonna
24 April	"Looking for Freedom" †	David Hasselhoff	Like a Prayer	Madonna
1 May	"Looking for Freedom" †	David Hasselhoff	Like a Prayer	Madonna
8 May	"Looking for Freedom" †	David Hasselhoff	Like a Prayer	Madonna
15 May	"Looking for Freedom" †	David Hasselhoff	Street Fighting Years	Simple Minds
22 May	"Looking for Freedom" †	David Hasselhoff	Street Fighting Years	Simple Minds
29 May	"The Look"	Roxette	Street Fighting Years	Simple Minds
5 June	"The Look"	Roxette	Street Fighting Years	Simple Minds
12 June	"The Look"	Roxette	Street Fighting Years	Simple Minds
19 June	"The Look"	Roxette	The Miracle	Queen
26 June	"The Look"	Roxette	Street Fighting Years	Simple Minds
3 July	"Das Omen (Teil I)"	Mysterious Art	The Miracle	Queen
10 July	"Das Omen (Teil I)"	Mysterious Art	Street Fighting Years	Simple Minds
17 July	"Das Omen (Teil I)"	Mysterious Art	The Miracle	Queen
24 July	"Das Omen (Teil I)"	Mysterious Art	The Miracle	Queen
31 July	"Das Omen (Teil I)"	Mysterious Art	The Miracle	Queen
7 August	"Das Omen (Teil I)"	Mysterious Art	The Miracle	Queen
14 August	"Das Omen (Teil I)"	Mysterious Art	The Miracle	Queen
21 August	"Das Omen (Teil I)"	Mysterious Art	The Miracle	Queen
28 August	"Das Omen (Teil I)"	Mysterious Art	Earth Moving	Mike Oldfield
4 September	"Swing the Mood"	Jive Bunny and the Mastermixers	Earth Moving	Mike Oldfield
11 September	"Swing the Mood"	Jive Bunny and the Mastermixers	Halleluja	Westernhagen
18 September	"Swing the Mood"	Jive Bunny and the Mastermixers	Halleluja	Westernhagen
25 September	"Lambada"	Kaoma	Halleluja	Westernhagen
2 October	"Lambada"	Kaoma	Foreign Affair	Tina Turner
9 October	"Lambada"	Kaoma	Foreign Affair	Tina Turner
16 October	"Lambada"	Kaoma	Foreign Affair	Tina Turner
23 October	"Lambada"	Kaoma	Foreign Affair	Tina Turner
30 October	"Lambada"	Kaoma	Kein Weg zu weit	Peter Maffay
6 November	"Lambada"	Kaoma	Crossroads	Tracy Chapman
13 November	"Lambada"	Kaoma	Crossroads	Tracy Chapman
20 November	"Lambada"	Kaoma	Crossroads	Tracy Chapman
27 November	"Lambada"	Kaoma	Crossroads	Tracy Chapman
4 December	"Another Day in Paradise"	Phil Collins	...But Seriously	Phil Collins
11 December	"Another Day in Paradise"	Phil Collins	...But Seriously	Phil Collins
18 December	"Another Day in Paradise"	Phil Collins	...But Seriously	Phil Collins
25 December	"Another Day in Paradise"	Phil Collins	...But Seriously	Phil Collins

== See also ==
- List of number-one hits (Germany)
