= List of number-one hits of 2020 (Switzerland) =

This is a list of the Swiss Hitparade number-one hits of 2020.

== Swiss charts ==
Issue date	Song	Artist	Album	Artist
5 January	"Dance Monkey"	Tones and I	Everyday Life	Coldplay
12 January	"Dance Monkey"	Tones and I	Liebes-Tattoo	Daniela Alfinito
19 January	"Dance Monkey"	Tones and I	Deitinge Nord	Chlyklass
26 January	"Dance Monkey"	Tones and I	Music to Be Murdered By	Eminem
2 February	"Dance Monkey"	Tones and I	Music to Be Murdered By	Eminem
9 February	"Blinding Lights"	The Weeknd	Estoy bien	Loco Escrito
16 February	"Blinding Lights"	The Weeknd	Father of All Motherfuckers	Green Day
23 February	"Blinding Lights"	The Weeknd	Changes	Justin Bieber
1 March	"Blinding Lights"	The Weeknd	Map of the Soul: 7	BTS
8 March	"Blinding Lights"	The Weeknd	Böhse Onkelz	Böhse Onkelz
15 March	"Blinding Lights"	The Weeknd	2020: Le Pari(s) des Enfoirés	Les Enfoirés
22 March	"Blinding Lights"	The Weeknd	#13	Gotthard
29 March	"Blinding Lights"	The Weeknd	After Hours	The Weeknd
5 April	"Blinding Lights"	The Weeknd	Sing meinen Song – Das Schweizer Tauschkonzert	Various artists
12 April	"Blinding Lights"	The Weeknd	Sing meinen Song – Das Schweizer Tauschkonzert	Various artists
19 April	"Blinding Lights"	The Weeknd	Sing meinen Song – Das Schweizer Tauschkonzert	Various artists
26 April	"Blinding Lights"	The Weeknd	Jibrail & Iblis	Samra
3 May	"Blinding Lights"	The Weeknd	Okey Dokey II	Bligg
10 May	"Nicht verdient"	Capital Bra and Loredana	Umverteilig (zu üs)	Chaostruppe
17 May	"Fame"	Apache 207	Okey Dokey II	Bligg
24 May	"Rockstar"	DaBaby featuring Roddy Ricch	Sommer, Sonne, Honolulu	Calimeros
31 May	"Rockstar"	DaBaby featuring Roddy Ricch	Sing meinen Song – Das Tauschkonzert, Vol. 7	Various artists
7 June	"Rockstar"	DaBaby featuring Roddy Ricch	Chromatica	Lady Gaga
14 June	"Rockstar"	DaBaby featuring Roddy Ricch	Das Album	Thomas Anders and Florian Silbereisen
21 June	"Rockstar"	DaBaby featuring Roddy Ricch	Pick Me Up Off the Floor	Norah Jones
28 June	"Rockstar"	DaBaby featuring Roddy Ricch	Rough and Rowdy Ways	Bob Dylan
5 July	"Rockstar"	DaBaby featuring Roddy Ricch	Rough and Rowdy Ways	Bob Dylan
12 July	"Savage Love (Laxed – Siren Beat)"	Jawsh 685 and Jason Derulo	Shoot for the Stars, Aim for the Moon	Pop Smoke
19 July	"Savage Love (Laxed – Siren Beat)"	Jawsh 685 and Jason Derulo	Tausend Träume	Die Amigos
26 July	"Savage Love (Laxed – Siren Beat)"	Jawsh 685 and Jason Derulo	Tausend Träume	Die Amigos
2 August	"Savage Love (Laxed – Siren Beat)"	Jawsh 685 and Jason Derulo	Folklore	Taylor Swift
9 August	"Savage Love (Laxed – Siren Beat)"	Jawsh 685 and Jason Derulo	Treppenhaus	Apache 207
16 August	"Savage Love (Laxed – Siren Beat)"	Jawsh 685 and Jason Derulo	Whoosh!	Deep Purple
23 August	"Savage Love (Laxed – Siren Beat)"	Jawsh 685 and Jason Derulo	Mini Schwiiz, mini Heimat	Beatrice Egli
30 August	"Savage Love (Laxed – Siren Beat)"	Jawsh 685 and Jason Derulo	Mini Schwiiz, mini Heimat	Beatrice Egli
6 September	"Jerusalema (Remix)"	Master KG featuring Burna Boy and Nomcebo Zikode	Point	Yello
13 September	"Jerusalema (Remix)"	Master KG featuring Burna Boy and Nomcebo Zikode	Halluzinationen	Sophie Hunger
20 September	"Jerusalema (Remix)"	Master KG featuring Burna Boy and Nomcebo Zikode	Hollywood	Bonez MC
27 September	"Mood"	24kGoldn featuring Iann Dior	CB7	Capital Bra
4 October	"Jerusalema (Remix)"	Master KG featuring Burna Boy and Nomcebo Zikode	9	Schwiizergoofe
11 October	"Jerusalema (Remix)"	Master KG featuring Burna Boy and Nomcebo Zikode	Steve Lee – The Eyes of a Tiger – In Memory of Our Unforgotten Friend	Gotthard
18 October	"Jerusalema (Remix)"	Master KG featuring Burna Boy and Nomcebo Zikode	Liebe für die Ewigkeit	Kastelruther Spatzen
25 October	"Jerusalema (Remix)"	Master KG featuring Burna Boy and Nomcebo Zikode	À l'aube revenant	Francis Cabrel
1 November	"Jerusalema (Remix)"	Master KG featuring Burna Boy and Nomcebo Zikode	Letter to You	Bruce Springsteen
8 November	"Jerusalema (Remix)"	Master KG featuring Burna Boy and Nomcebo Zikode	Letter to You	Bruce Springsteen
15 November	"Jerusalema (Remix)"	Master KG featuring Burna Boy and Nomcebo Zikode	Letter to You	Bruce Springsteen
22 November	"Jerusalema (Remix)"	Master KG featuring Burna Boy and Nomcebo Zikode	Power Up	AC/DC
29 November	"Jerusalema (Remix)"	Master KG featuring Burna Boy and Nomcebo Zikode	Power Up	AC/DC
6 December	"Jerusalema (Remix)"	Master KG featuring Burna Boy and Nomcebo Zikode	Power Up	AC/DC
13 December	"All I Want for Christmas Is You"	Mariah Carey	Power Up	AC/DC
20 December	"All I Want for Christmas Is You"	Mariah Carey	Power Up	AC/DC
27 December	"All I Want for Christmas Is You"	Mariah Carey	Power Up	AC/DC

== Romandie charts ==
Issue date	Song	Artist	Album	Artist
5 January	"Dance Monkey"	Tones and I	Les mômes et les enfants d'abord	Renaud
12 January	"Dance Monkey"	Tones and I	VersuS	Vitaa and Slimane
19 January	"Dance Monkey"	Tones and I	VersuS	Vitaa and Slimane
26 January	"Dance Monkey"	Tones and I	Music to Be Murdered By	Eminem
2 February	"Dance Monkey"	Tones and I	Poison	Dadju
9 February	"Blinding Lights"	The Weeknd	VersuS	Vitaa and Slimane
16 February	"Blinding Lights"	The Weeknd	Father of All Motherfuckers	Green Day
23 February	"Blinding Lights"	The Weeknd	VersuS	Vitaa and Slimane
1 March	"Blinding Lights"	The Weeknd	Map of the Soul: 7	BTS
8 March	"Blinding Lights"	The Weeknd	Map of the Soul: 7	BTS
15 March	"Dance Monkey"	Tones and I	2020: Le Pari(s) des Enfoirés	Les Enfoirés
22 March	"Dance Monkey"	Tones and I	2020: Le Pari(s) des Enfoirés	Les Enfoirés
29 March	"Blinding Lights"	The Weeknd	After Hours	The Weeknd
5 April	"Blinding Lights"	The Weeknd	Gigaton	Pearl Jam
12 April	"Pour les gens du secours"	Florent Pagny, Pascal Obispo and Marc Lavoine	2020: Le Pari(s) des Enfoirés	Les Enfoirés
19 April	"Blinding Lights"	The Weeknd	Human. :II: Nature.	Nightwish
26 April	"Les mots bleus"	Christophe	Best Of	Christophe
3 May	"Living in a Ghost Town"	The Rolling Stones	Human. :II: Nature.	Nightwish
10 May	"Shallow"	Lady Gaga and Bradley Cooper	A Star Is Born	Lady Gaga and Bradley Cooper
17 May	"Blinding Lights"	The Weeknd	2020: Le Pari(s) des Enfoirés	Les Enfoirés
24 May	"Blinding Lights"	The Weeknd	Sommer, Sonne, Honolulu	Calimeros
31 May	"Nos célébrations"	Indochine	2020: Le Pari(s) des Enfoirés	Les Enfoirés
7 June	"Nos célébrations"	Indochine	Chromatica	Lady Gaga
14 June	"Kings & Queens"	Ava Max	Ade merci	Bzar
21 June	"Habibi"	Kendji Girac	Pick Me Up Off the Floor	Norah Jones
28 June	"Mais je t'aime"	Grand Corps Malade and Camille Lellouche	Rough and Rowdy Ways	Bob Dylan
5 July	"Mais je t'aime"	Grand Corps Malade and Camille Lellouche	Grand Prix	Benjamin Biolay
12 July	"Savage Love (Laxed – Siren Beat)"	Jawsh 685 and Jason Derulo	Rough and Rowdy Ways	Bob Dylan
19 July	"Jerusalema"	Master KG featuring Nomcebo Zikode	Tausend Träume	Die Amigos
26 July	"Savage Love (Laxed – Siren Beat)"	Jawsh 685 and Jason Derulo	The Absence of Presence	Kansas
2 August	"Jerusalema"	Master KG featuring Nomcebo Zikode	Folklore	Taylor Swift
9 August	"Jerusalema"	Master KG featuring Nomcebo Zikode	Such Pretty Forks in the Road	Alanis Morissette
16 August	"Jerusalema"	Master KG featuring Nomcebo Zikode	Whoosh!	Deep Purple
23 August	"Jerusalema"	Master KG featuring Nomcebo Zikode	Whoosh!	Deep Purple
30 August	"Jerusalema"	Master KG featuring Nomcebo Zikode	Amstram	Phanee De Pool
6 September	"Jerusalema"	Master KG featuring Nomcebo Zikode	Singles Collection (2001–2021)	Indochine
13 September	"Jerusalema"	Master KG featuring Nomcebo Zikode	Aimée	Julien Doré
20 September	"Jerusalema"	Master KG featuring Nomcebo Zikode	Mesdames	Grand Corps Malade
27 September	"Jerusalema"	Master KG featuring Nomcebo Zikode	Mesdames	Grand Corps Malade
4 October	"Jerusalema"	Master KG featuring Nomcebo Zikode	Mesdames	Grand Corps Malade
11 October	"Jerusalema"	Master KG featuring Nomcebo Zikode	Steve Lee – The Eyes of a Tiger – In Memory of Our Unforgotten Friend	Gotthard
18 October	"Jerusalema"	Master KG featuring Nomcebo Zikode	La vida	Kendji Girac
25 October	"Jerusalema"	Master KG featuring Nomcebo Zikode	À l'aube revenant	Francis Cabrel
1 November	"Jerusalema"	Master KG featuring Nomcebo Zikode	Letter to You	Bruce Springsteen
8 November	"Jerusalema"	Master KG featuring Nomcebo Zikode	À l'aube revenant	Francis Cabrel
15 November	"Jerusalema"	Master KG featuring Nomcebo Zikode	À l'aube revenant	Francis Cabrel
