= Vince Martin (singer) =

Vince Martin (born Vincent Marcellino; March 17, 1937 – July 6, 2018) was an American folk singer and songwriter.

He first recorded with the Tarriers (Erik Darling, Alan Arkin and Bob Carey) in 1956, on the hit single "Cindy, Oh Cindy", adapted by Burt D'Lugoff and Bob Nemiroff from the Georgia Sea Islands folk song "Pay Me My Money Down". The record's flip, "Only If You Praise the Lord", written by Dick Cella, was a hit in England and Ireland. He became more widely known with his duo recordings with Fred Neil in the early 1960s. The album Tear Down The Walls (1964) contained mainly Neil's songs, recorded with musicians including John Sebastian and Felix Pappalardi, and became popular and influential on the burgeoning folk (and later folk rock) scene.

In 1969, he recorded the album If the Jasmine Don't Get You ... the Bay Breeze Will in Nashville, with the musicians who had just finished recording Bob Dylan's Nashville Skyline. A second solo album, Vince Martin, followed in 1973.

Martin was featured in Vagabondo! (2010), a documentary about his life.

He died at the age of 81 from pulmonary fibrosis.
