= List of number-one hits of 1965 (Germany) =

This is a list of the German Media Control Top100 Singles Chart number-ones of 1965.

Issue date	Song	Artist
2 January	"Kleine Annabell"	Ronny
9 January	"Kleine Annabell"	Ronny
16 January	"Oh, Pretty Woman"	Roy Orbison
23 January	"Oh, Pretty Woman"	Roy Orbison
30 January	"Das ist die Frage aller Fragen"	Cliff Richard
6 February	"Das ist die Frage aller Fragen"	Cliff Richard
13 February	"Das ist die Frage aller Fragen"	Cliff Richard
20 February	"Das ist die Frage aller Fragen"	Cliff Richard
27 February	"Kleine Annabell"	Ronny
6 March	"Kleine Annabell"	Ronny
13 March	"Das war mein schönster Tanz"	Bernd Spier
20 March	"Das war mein schönster Tanz"	Bernd Spier
27 March	"Downtown"	Petula Clark
3 April	"Downtown"	Petula Clark
10 April	"Downtown"	Petula Clark
17 April	"Downtown"	Petula Clark
24 April	"Downtown"	Petula Clark
1 May	"Downtown"	Petula Clark
8 May	"Downtown"	Petula Clark
15 May	"Downtown"	Petula Clark
22 May	"The Last Time"	The Rolling Stones
29 May	"The Last Time"	The Rolling Stones
5 June	"The Last Time"	The Rolling Stones
12 June	"The Last Time"	The Rolling Stones
19 June	"Heute male ich dein Bild, Cindy Lou"	Drafi Deutscher
26 June	"Heute male ich dein Bild, Cindy Lou"	Drafi Deutscher
3 July	"Heute male ich dein Bild, Cindy Lou"	Drafi Deutscher
10 July	"Il Silenzio"	Nini Rosso
17 July	"Il Silenzio"	Nini Rosso
24 July	"Il Silenzio"	Nini Rosso
31 July	"Il Silenzio"	Nini Rosso
7 August	"Il Silenzio"	Nini Rosso
14 August	"Il Silenzio"	Nini Rosso
21 August	"Il Silenzio"	Nini Rosso
28 August	"Il Silenzio"	Nini Rosso
4 September	"Il Silenzio"	Nini Rosso
11 September	"Il Silenzio"	Nini Rosso
18 September	"Il Silenzio"	Nini Rosso
25 September	"Il Silenzio"	Nini Rosso
2 October	"Wooly Bully"	Sam The Sham & The Pharaohs
9 October	"Wooly Bully"	Sam The Sham & The Pharaohs
16 October	"Wooly Bully"	Sam The Sham & The Pharaohs
23 October	"(I Can't Get No) Satisfaction"	The Rolling Stones
30 October	"(I Can't Get No) Satisfaction"	The Rolling Stones
6 November	"(I Can't Get No) Satisfaction"	The Rolling Stones
13 November	"(I Can't Get No) Satisfaction"	The Rolling Stones
20 November	"(I Can't Get No) Satisfaction"	The Rolling Stones
27 November	"(I Can't Get No) Satisfaction"	The Rolling Stones
4 December	"Marmor, Stein und Eisen bricht"	Drafi Deutscher
11 December	"Marmor, Stein und Eisen bricht"	Drafi Deutscher
18 December	"Marmor, Stein und Eisen bricht"	Drafi Deutscher
25 December	"Marmor, Stein und Eisen bricht"	Drafi Deutscher

== See also ==
- List of number-one hits (Germany)
