= List of number-one hits of 1976 (Germany) =

This is a list of the German Media Control Top100 Singles chart number ones of 1976.

Issue date	Song	Artist
5 January	"Dolannes-Melodie"	Jean-Claude Borelly
12 January	"Dolannes-Melodie"	Jean-Claude Borelly
19 January	"Lady Bump"	Penny McLean
26 January	"Dolannes-Melodie"	Jean-Claude Borelly
2 February	"Moviestar"	Harpo
9 February	"Mamma Mia"	ABBA
16 February	"Moviestar"	Harpo
23 February	"Moviestar"	Harpo
1 March	"Moviestar"	Harpo
8 March	"Mississippi"	Pussycat
15 March	"Mississippi"	Pussycat
22 March	"Mississippi"	Pussycat
29 March	"Mississippi"	Pussycat
5 April	"Rocky"	Frank Farian
12 April	"Mississippi"	Pussycat
19 April	"Rocky"	Frank Farian
26 April	"Rocky"	Frank Farian
3 May	"Fernando"	ABBA
10 May	"Rocky"	Frank Farian
17 May	"Fernando"	ABBA
24 May	"Fernando"	ABBA
31 May	"Fernando"	ABBA
7 June	"Fernando"	ABBA
14 June	"Fernando"	ABBA
21 June	"Fernando"	ABBA
28 June	"Let Your Love Flow"	The Bellamy Brothers
5 July	"Let Your Love Flow"	The Bellamy Brothers
12 July	"Let Your Love Flow"	The Bellamy Brothers
19 July	"Let Your Love Flow"	The Bellamy Brothers
26 July	"Let Your Love Flow"	The Bellamy Brothers
2 August	"Ein Bett im Kornfeld"	Jürgen Drews
9 August	"Ein Bett im Kornfeld"	Jürgen Drews
16 August	"Ein Bett im Kornfeld"	Jürgen Drews
23 August	"Ein Bett im Kornfeld"	Jürgen Drews
30 August	"Ein Bett im Kornfeld"	Jürgen Drews
6 September	"Ein Bett im Kornfeld"	Jürgen Drews
13 September	"Daddy Cool"	Boney M.
20 September	"Dancing Queen"	ABBA
27 September	"Daddy Cool"	Boney M.
4 October	"Daddy Cool"	Boney M.
11 October	"Daddy Cool"	Boney M.
18 October	"Daddy Cool"	Boney M.
25 October	"Daddy Cool"	Boney M.
1 November	"Daddy Cool"	Boney M.
8 November	"Daddy Cool"	Boney M.
15 November	"Daddy Cool"	Boney M.
22 November	"Daddy Cool"	Boney M.
29 November	"Daddy Cool"	Boney M.
6 December	"Jeans On"	David Dundas
13 December	"Daddy Cool"	Boney M.
20 December	"Money, Money, Money"	ABBA
27 December	"Money, Money, Money"	ABBA

== See also ==
- List of number-one hits (Germany)
