= List of number-one hits of 1994 (Germany) =

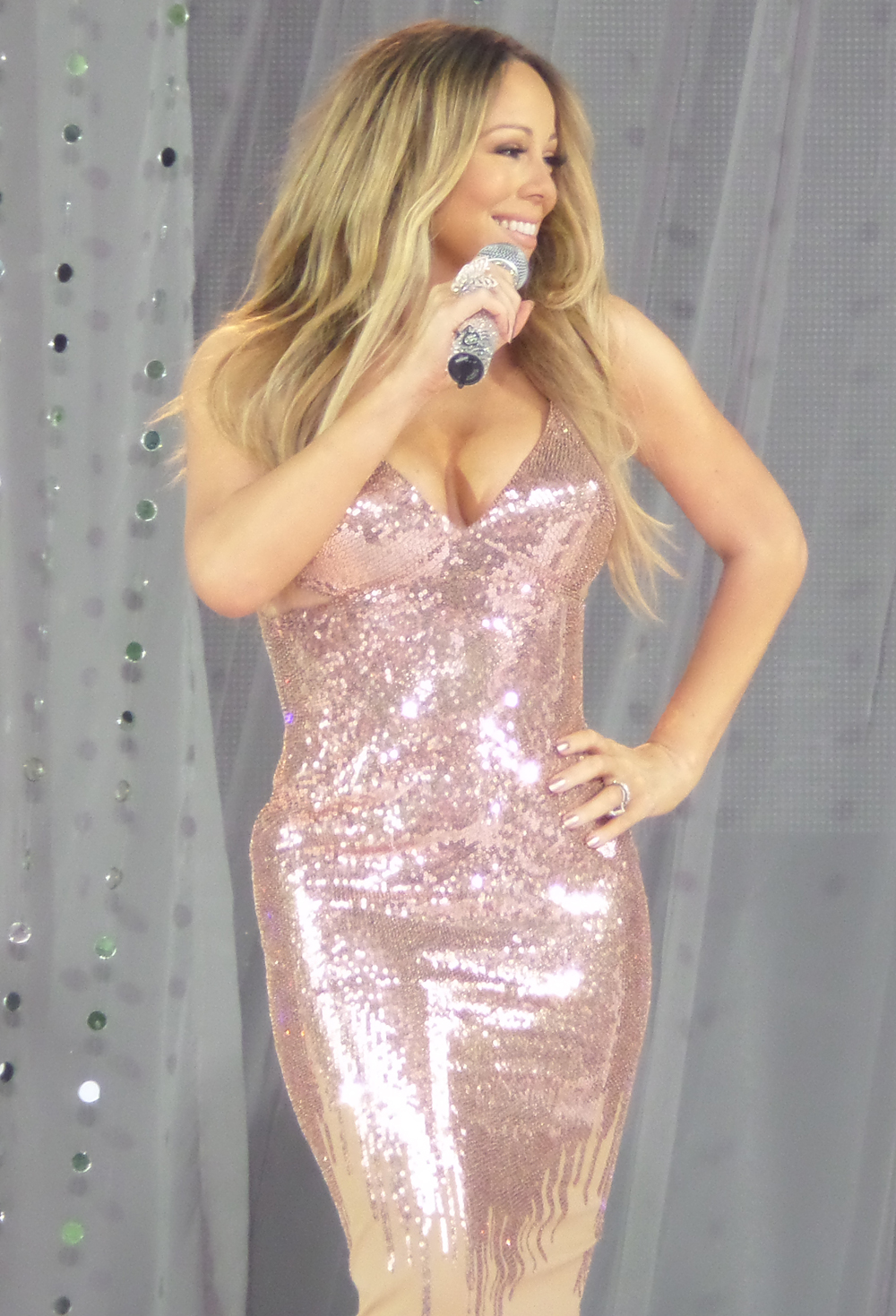
Mariah Carey's (pictured) Music Box and "Without You" became the best performing-album and single of the year respectively.

This is a list of the German Media Control Top100 Singles Chart number-ones of 1994.

== Number-one hits by week ==
Key
†	Indicates best-performing single and album of 1994

Issue date	Song	Artist	Ref.	Album	Artist	Ref.
3 January	"I'd Do Anything for Love (But I Won't Do That)"	Meat Loaf		Both Sides	Phil Collins	
10 January	"I'd Do Anything for Love (But I Won't Do That)"	Meat Loaf		Both Sides	Phil Collins	
17 January	"I'd Do Anything for Love (But I Won't Do That)"	Meat Loaf		Both Sides	Phil Collins	
24 January	"The Sign"	Ace of Base		Both Sides	Phil Collins	
31 January	"The Sign"	Ace of Base		So Far So Good	Bryan Adams	
7 February	"The Sign"	Ace of Base		So Far So Good	Bryan Adams	
14 February	"All for Love"	Bryan Adams, Sting & Rod Stewart		So Far So Good	Bryan Adams	
21 February	"All for Love"	Bryan Adams, Sting & Rod Stewart		So Far So Good	Bryan Adams	
28 February	"All for Love"	Bryan Adams, Sting & Rod Stewart		So Far So Good	Bryan Adams	
7 March	"All for Love"	Bryan Adams, Sting & Rod Stewart		So Far So Good	Bryan Adams	
14 March	"Omen III"	Magic Affair		So Far So Good	Bryan Adams	
21 March	"Omen III"	Magic Affair		So Far So Good	Bryan Adams	
28 March	"Omen III"	Magic Affair		So Far So Good	Bryan Adams	
4 April	"Omen III"	Magic Affair		Music Box †	Mariah Carey	
11 April	"Streets of Philadelphia"	Bruce Springsteen		Music Box †	Mariah Carey	
18 April	"Streets of Philadelphia"	Bruce Springsteen		The Division Bell	Pink Floyd	
25 April	"Streets of Philadelphia"	Bruce Springsteen		The Division Bell	Pink Floyd	
2 May	"Streets of Philadelphia"	Bruce Springsteen		The Division Bell	Pink Floyd	
9 May	"Streets of Philadelphia"	Bruce Springsteen		The Division Bell	Pink Floyd	
16 May	"Without You" †	Mariah Carey		Music Box †	Mariah Carey	
23 May	"Without You" †	Mariah Carey		Music Box †	Mariah Carey	
30 May	"Without You" †	Mariah Carey		Music Box †	Mariah Carey	
6 June	"Without You" †	Mariah Carey		Music Box †	Mariah Carey	
13 June	"United"	Prince Ital Joe & Marky Mark		Music Box †	Mariah Carey	
20 June	"United"	Prince Ital Joe & Marky Mark		Music Box †	Mariah Carey	
27 June	"United"	Prince Ital Joe & Marky Mark		Music Box †	Mariah Carey	
4 July	"United"	Prince Ital Joe & Marky Mark		Music Box †	Mariah Carey	
11 July	"United"	Prince Ital Joe & Marky Mark		Music Box †	Mariah Carey	
18 July	"Mmm Mmm Mmm Mmm"	Crash Test Dummies		God Shuffled His Feet	Crash Test Dummies	
25 July	"I Swear"	All-4-One		Voodoo Lounge	The Rolling Stones	
1 August	"I Swear"	All-4-One		Voodoo Lounge	The Rolling Stones	
8 August	"I Swear"	All-4-One		Voodoo Lounge	The Rolling Stones	
15 August	"I Swear"	All-4-One		Voodoo Lounge	The Rolling Stones	
22 August	"I Swear"	All-4-One		Voodoo Lounge	The Rolling Stones	
29 August	"I Swear"	All-4-One		Voodoo Lounge	The Rolling Stones	
5 September	"I Swear"	All-4-One		End of Part One: Their Greatest Hits	Wet Wet Wet	
12 September	"I Swear"	All-4-One		Affentheater	Westernhagen	
19 September	"I Swear"	All-4-One		Affentheater	Westernhagen	
26 September	"Eins, Zwei, Polizei"	Mo-Do		Affentheater	Westernhagen	
3 October	"Eins, Zwei, Polizei"	Mo-Do		Affentheater	Westernhagen	
10 October	"Eins, Zwei, Polizei"	Mo-Do		Affentheater	Westernhagen	
17 October	"Eins, Zwei, Polizei"	Mo-Do		Affentheater	Westernhagen	
24 October	"Saturday Night"	Whigfield		Affentheater	Westernhagen	
31 October	"Saturday Night"	Whigfield		Affentheater	Westernhagen	
7 November	"Cotton Eye Joe"	Rednex		Cross Road	Bon Jovi	
14 November	"Cotton Eye Joe"	Rednex		Cross Road	Bon Jovi	
21 November	"Cotton Eye Joe"	Rednex		Cross Road	Bon Jovi	
28 November	"Cotton Eye Joe"	Rednex		Cross Road	Bon Jovi	
5 December	"Cotton Eye Joe"	Rednex		Cross Road	Bon Jovi	
12 December	"Cotton Eye Joe"	Rednex		Cross Road	Bon Jovi	
19 December	"Cotton Eye Joe"	Rednex		Over The Hump	The Kelly Family	
26 December	No release (Note: Same issue as for 19 December.)					

== See also ==
- List of number-one hits (Germany)
- List of German airplay number-one songs
