= Gamsbart =

Decorative plume worn on hats in Austria and Bavaria

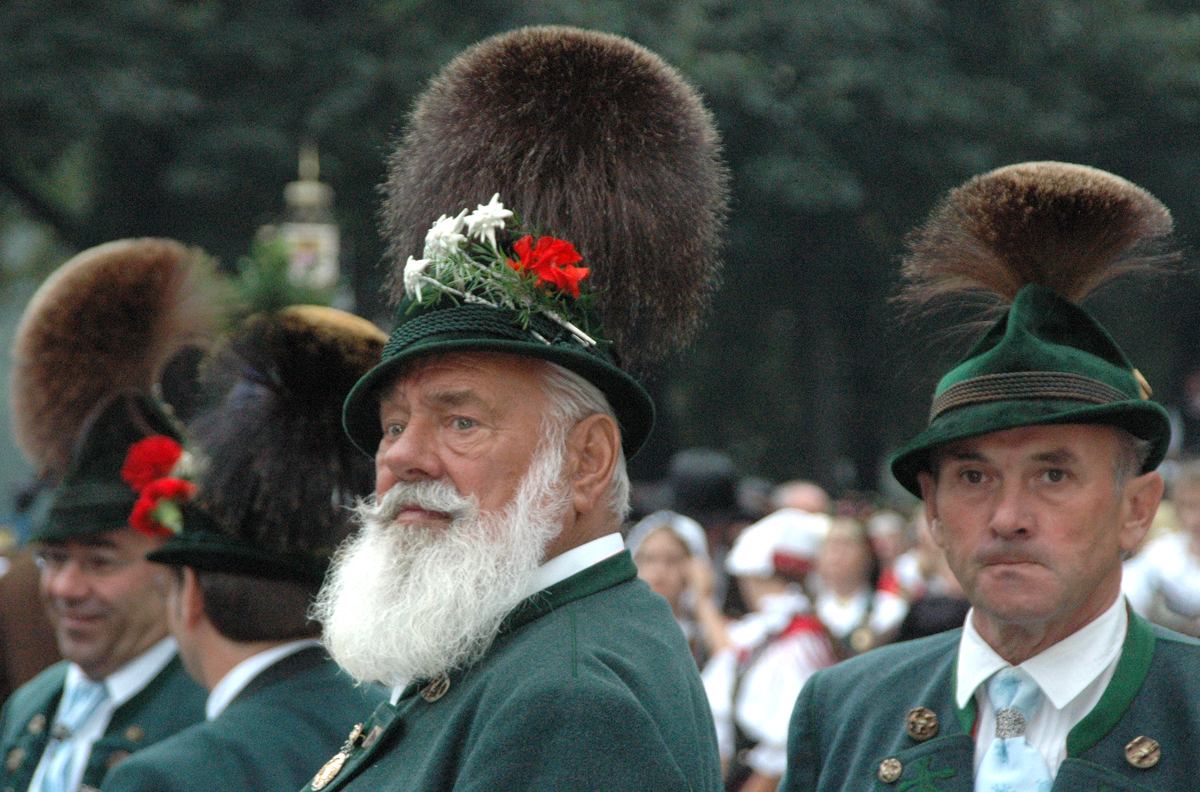
At the Oktoberfest in Munich

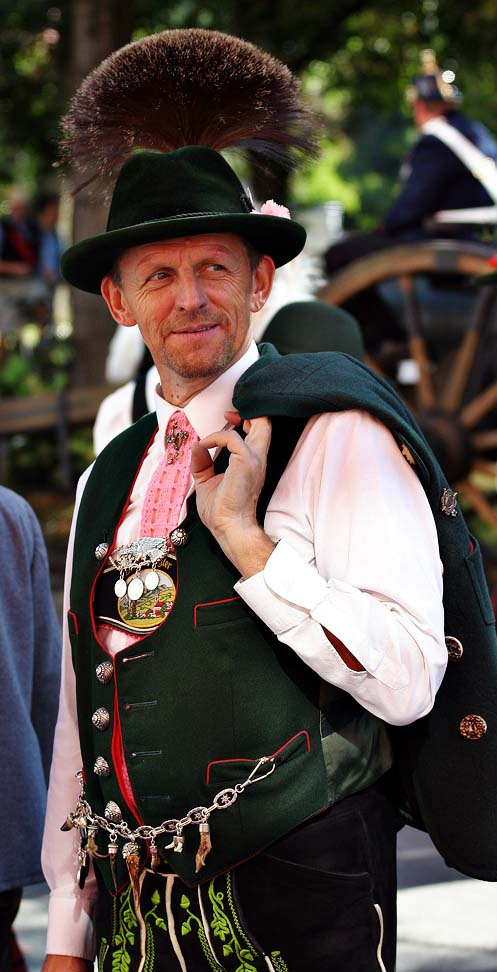
Traditional costume of Miesbach, Bavaria

A Gamsbart (German: ['gamsbɑːʁt], literally "chamois' beard") is a decorative plume worn on hats in Austria and Bavaria that is traditionally made from the long hair that grows along the backbone and top of the neck of an adult male chamois (German: Gämse) in winter. Fashioned into the form of a brush or fan, a Gamsbart was originally a hunting trophy worn as an ornament on hunter's hats. Gamsbärte (plural) can also be found on other types of hats that are part of the various types of Tracht, traditional costume that is still worn on special occasions in those regions.

A Gamsbart is made by enclosing the lower end of the tuft of hair in a setting of metal or horn that allows the upper end to spread in a brush- or fan-like fashion. Traditionally, hairs are selected for a dark color at the lower end with a very light tip. The size and diameter of the Gamsbart are important signs of the wearer's pride and manliness. Though traditionally worn by men, recent developments in dirndl fashion have seen Gamsbärte added to various places on female dresses.

Decorative hat plumes made from the hair of other animals such as goats, antelopes and badgers are called Wildbart or Wildhaarbart, the German word Wild meaning game.
