= List of number-one hits of 1992 (Germany) =

This is a list of the German Media Control Top100 Singles Chart number-ones of 1992.

== Number-one hits by week ==
Key
†	Indicates best-performing single and album of 1992

Issue date	Song	Artist	Ref.	Album	Artist	Ref.
6 January	"Let's Talk About Sex"	Salt-n-Pepa		We Can't Dance †	Genesis	
13 January	"Let's Talk About Sex"	Salt-n-Pepa		We Can't Dance †	Genesis	
20 January	"Let's Talk About Sex"	Salt-n-Pepa		We Can't Dance †	Genesis	
27 January	"Das Boot"	U96		We Can't Dance †	Genesis	
3 February	"Das Boot"	U96		We Can't Dance †	Genesis	
10 February	"Das Boot"	U96		We Can't Dance †	Genesis	
17 February	"Das Boot"	U96		We Can't Dance †	Genesis	
24 February	"Das Boot"	U96		We Can't Dance †	Genesis	
2 March	"Das Boot"	U96		We Can't Dance †	Genesis	
9 March	"Das Boot"	U96		We Can't Dance †	Genesis	
16 March	"Das Boot"	U96		We Can't Dance †	Genesis	
23 March	"Das Boot"	U96		We Can't Dance †	Genesis	
30 March	"Das Boot"	U96		We Can't Dance †	Genesis	
6 April	"Das Boot"	U96		JaJa	Westernhagen	
13 April	"Das Boot"	U96		JaJa	Westernhagen	
20 April	"Das Boot"	U96		JaJa	Westernhagen	
27 April	"To Be with You"	Mr. Big		JaJa	Westernhagen	
4 May	"To Be with You"	Mr. Big		JaJa	Westernhagen	
11 May	"To Be with You"	Mr. Big		JaJa	Westernhagen	
18 May	"To Be with You"	Mr. Big		JaJa	Westernhagen	
25 May	"Rhythm Is a Dancer" †	Snap!		Power of Ten	Chris de Burgh	
1 June	"Rhythm Is a Dancer" †	Snap!		Power of Ten	Chris de Burgh	
8 June	"Rhythm Is a Dancer" †	Snap!		JaJa	Westernhagen	
15 June	"Rhythm Is a Dancer" †	Snap!		JaJa	Westernhagen	
22 June	"Rhythm Is a Dancer" †	Snap!		JaJa	Westernhagen	
29 June	"Rhythm Is a Dancer" †	Snap!		JaJa	Westernhagen	
6 July	"Rhythm Is a Dancer" †	Snap!		JaJa	Westernhagen	
13 July	"Rhythm Is a Dancer" †	Snap!		The One	Elton John	
20 July	"Rhythm Is a Dancer" †	Snap!		The One	Elton John	
27 July	"Rhythm Is a Dancer" †	Snap!		We Can't Dance †	Genesis	
3 August	"It's My Life"	Dr. Alban		We Can't Dance †	Genesis	
10 August	"It's My Life"	Dr. Alban		We Can't Dance †	Genesis	
17 August	"It's My Life"	Dr. Alban		We Can't Dance †	Genesis	
24 August	"It's My Life"	Dr. Alban		We Can't Dance †	Genesis	
31 August	"It's My Life"	Dr. Alban		We Can't Dance †	Genesis	
7 September	"It's My Life"	Dr. Alban		Dangerous	Michael Jackson	
14 September	"It's My Life"	Dr. Alban		Tourism	Roxette	
21 September	"It's My Life"	Dr. Alban		Tourism	Roxette	
28 September	"Sweat (A La La La La Long)"	Inner Circle		Tourism	Roxette	
5 October	"Sweat (A La La La La Long)"	Inner Circle		Tourism	Roxette	
12 October	"Sweat (A La La La La Long)"	Inner Circle		Tourism	Roxette	
19 October	"Sweat (A La La La La Long)"	Inner Circle		Us	Peter Gabriel	
26 October	"Sweat (A La La La La Long)"	Inner Circle		Us	Peter Gabriel	
2 November	"Sweat (A La La La La Long)"	Inner Circle		Gold: Greatest Hits	ABBA	
9 November	"Sweat (A La La La La Long)"	Inner Circle		Gold: Greatest Hits	ABBA	
16 November	"Sweat (A La La La La Long)"	Inner Circle		Gold: Greatest Hits	ABBA	
23 November	"Sweat (A La La La La Long)"	Inner Circle		Gold: Greatest Hits	ABBA	
30 November	"Sweat (A La La La La Long)"	Inner Circle		Gold: Greatest Hits	ABBA	
7 December	"Sweat (A La La La La Long)"	Inner Circle		Gold: Greatest Hits	ABBA	
14 December	"Sweat (A La La La La Long)"	Inner Circle		Gold: Greatest Hits	ABBA	
21 December	"More and More"	Captain Hollywood Project		Gold: Greatest Hits	ABBA	
28 December	No release (Note: Same issue as for 21 December.)					
