= Dear Mrs. Applebee =

- US single label

Single by Flip Cartridge
- B-side: "Don't Take the Lovers From the World"
- Released: July 1966
- Genre: Novelty; pop
- Length: 2:07
- Label: Parrot
- Songwriters: Billy Meshel; Philip Barr
- Producer: Hugo & Luigi

Flip Cartridge singles chronology
"Dear Mrs. Applebee" (1966)	"Isn't That a Dainty Dish" (1966)

"Dear Mrs. Applebee" is a song written by Billy Meshel and Philip Barr and initial recorded by Meshel under the pseudonym Flip Cartridge. The song lyrically revolves around a boy who wants to date Mrs. Applebee's daughter Marie. Musically, it is a novelty song with pop elements. Cartridge's version of the song was released in July 1966 through Parrot Records, and reached number 91 on the Billboard Hot 100. Music critics drew parallels between "Dear Mrs. Applebee" and "Mrs. Brown, You've Got a Lovely Daughter" by Herman's Hermits upon original release.

However, the song is primarily known through a version by British pop singer David Garrick, who's manager Robert Wace got ahold of the original recording during a tour of the US. After passing it to producer John Schroeder, Garrick recorded it with an arrangement by Alan Tew. Garrick's version of the song was released on Piccadilly Records in the UK on 9 September 1966, as was Cartridge's version. Garrick's version reached number 22 on the Record Retailer chart in the UK, but was a bigger hit in Continental Europe, reaching number one in West Germany for two weeks in March 1967.

== Composition and original version ==
"Dear Mrs. Applebee" was written by Billy Meshel and Philip Barr and was initially recorded by Meshel under the pseudonym Flip Cartridge. Lyrically, the song regards a boy who looks to date the titular Mrs. Applebee's daughter, who is named Marie. Musically, biographer Roger Dopson identifies the song as a novelty song, whereas Music & Media refers to it as pop. Cartridge's version of the song was produced by songwriting team Hugo & Luigi as part of a production deal with Parrot Records. Parrot released "Mrs. Applebee" in the US during July 1966, with Hugo & Luigi's "Don't Take the Lovers From the World" as the B-side.

The Flip Cartridge version of "Dear Mrs. Applebee" reached number 91 on the Billboard Hot 100 during a two-week run. It fared better in Canada, where it reached number 77 on the RPM 100. Billboard wrote that the song was an "easy-go teen rhythm ballad" that featured a "well done" vocal and "clever" brass backing that they compared to the Herman's Hermits rendition of "Mrs. Brown, You've Got a Lovely Daughter". Record World similarly compared the lyrics to "Mrs. Brown". Cash Box described the song as a "sweet, pretty plea" on the part of the narrator, and described it as "meaningful". They felt that the "pleasant interpretation" should "attract attention".

== David Garrick rendition ==
"Dear Mrs. Applebee"
- German single sleeve

Single by David Garrick

from the album A Boy Called David
- B-side: "You're What I'm Living For"
- Released: 9 September 1966
- Genre: Novelty; pop
- Length: 2:18
- Label: Piccadilly
- Songwriters: Billy Meshel; Philip Barr
- Producer: John Schroeder

David Garrick singles chronology
"Lady Jane" (1966)	"Dear Mrs. Applebee" (1966)	"I've Found a Love" (1967)

Performance on Beat-Club
- "Dear Mrs. Applebee" on YouTube

=== Background and recording ===
That same year, British pop singer David Garrick recorded "Dear Mrs. Applebee" as a follow-up to his cover of the the Rolling Stones "Lady Jane", which had been a top-30 hit on the Record Retailer chart in the UK. Garrick's manager Robert Wace had found the song whilst on tour in the US with the Kinks, and he recommended it to producer John Schroeder, who similarly favored it as it "was so David". According to Garrick, Wace and Schroeder both "ganged up" on him to "persuade him to record it". It was unanimously decided to record the song as they found out there were no plans to release the Flip Cartridge version in the UK.

Garrick's recording was produced by Schroeder, and featured an arrangement written and conducted by Alan Tew. Alan Florence was present as an engineer. Among session men on the recording were keyboardist Roger Coulam. Schroeder and Florence had problems with the song's mix, as Wace felt that the recording lacked "quite the magic", with Schroeder later describing that they "couldn't get it right". Schroeder and Florence had to remix "Dear Mrs. Applebee" four times before achieving a satisfactory take. According to Schroeder, after hearing the final mix, Wace took "two more pills".

=== Release and commercial performance ===
Contrary to the belief that Flip Cartridge's version would not be issued in the UK, both his and David Garrick's recordings of the song were released simultaneously on 9 September 1966, Cartridge's on London Recordings and Garrick's on the Pye Records subsidiary Piccadilly. The single's B-side was "You're What I'm Living For", which had been written by Mort Shuman. As a promotional stunt for the single, Garrick offered "a batch of LPs", "a night on the town" and a dinner to any girl named Marie Applebee. However, the stunt backfired; all applicants were deemed to use fabricated names with the exception of a six-year-old girl.

Nonetheless, "Dear Mrs. Applebee" entered the UK Record Retailer charts at number 43 on 28 September 1966, before peaking at number 22 on 19 October. In total, the single spent nine weeks in the top-50 before dropping out in November. The single saw greater success internationally than domestically, reaching number two in neighboring Ireland. Outside the British Isles, it was also a top-ten single in Denmark, New Zealand, the Netherlands, Rhodesia, and Singapore. However, "Dear Mrs. Applebee" saw its greatest commercial success in the German-speaking world, becoming a top-ten hit in Austria, and reached number one for two weeks on the West German charts in March 1967.

Garrick recalled that at the height of the single's success in West Germany, Vogue Records sent him a telegram in which it was claimed that "Dear Mrs. Applebee" had "shifted something like 250,000 copies in its first week". According to Schroeder, the success of "Mrs. Applebee" propelled David Garrick into a "huge artist" who "commanded serious money". It established Garrick as a major pop star in West Germany, and his popularity in Continental Europe remained strong during the remainder of the 1960s. "Mrs. Applebee" was also released as part of Garrick's debut album A Boy Called David in 1967.

=== Critical reception ===
Writing for Record Mirror, Norman Jopling and Peter Jones wrote that the song was a "poignant, little-boy song" that contained very simple lyrics. However, they were split on whether it was a "good song" or "corny", despite being "wistful and sincere" most of the times. Peter Asher of Peter and Gordon felt that the single would become a big hit in America as it was in "Herman's [Hermits]-style". On the contrary, Herman Hermit's lead vocalist Peter Noone derided "Mrs. Applebee" as somebody attempting to sing "Mrs Brown, You've Got a Lovely Daughter" "two years late". John Schroeder praised Alan Tew's arrangement as "excellent", a label he also gave to Garrick's vocal performance.

== Chart performance ==
=== Flip Cartridge version ===
Weekly chart performance for "Dear Mrs. Applebee"
Chart (1966)	Peak position
Canada (RPM 100)	77
US (Billboard Hot 100)	91
US (Cash Box Top 100)	91
US (Record World 100 Top Pops)	85

=== David Garrick version ===
Weekly chart performance for "Dear Mrs. Applebee"
Chart (1966–67)	Peak position
Austria (Disc Parade)	3
Australia (Kent Music Report)	42
Belgium (Ultratop 50 Flanders)	4
Belgium (Ultratop 50 Wallonia)	49
Denmark (DR Top 20)	10
Ireland (IRMA)	2
Netherlands (Veronica Top 40)	3
Netherlands (Single Top 100)	3
New Zealand (Listener)	7
Rhodesia (Lyons Maid)	5
Singapore (Radio Singapore)	2
South Africa (Springbok Radio)	19
UK (Disc and Music Echo)	28
UK (Melody Maker)	23
UK (New Musical Express)	28
UK (Record Retailer)	22
West Germany (Musikmarkt)	1

Annual chart rankings for "Dear Mrs. Applebee"
Chart (1966)	Rank
Belgium (Ultratop 50 Flanders)	59
Netherlands (Veronica Top 40)	70

Chart (1967)	Rank
Austria (Disc Parade)	12
Belgium (Ultratop 50 Flanders)	51
Netherlands (Veronica Top 40)	37
West Germany (Musikmarkt)	5

== Sources ==
- Dopson, Roger (1998). The Pye Anthology (CD liner notes). United Kingdom: Sequel. NEECD 297.
- Kent, David (2005). Australian Chart Book 1940–1969. Turramurra, NSW: Australian Chart Book. ISBN 0-646-44439-5. OCLC 62561852.
- Kimberley, Christopher (2000). Zimbabwe: Singles Chart Book. Zimbabwe. OCLC 499262382.
- Schroeder, John (2016). All for the Love of Music. United Kingdom: Matador. ISBN 9-781-78589-165-6.
