= Nicht verdient =

2020 single by Capital Bra and Loredana

Single by Capital Bra and Loredana

from the album CB7
- Language: German
- Released: 29 April 2020
- Length: 2:56
- Label: Bra Musik
- Songwriters: Capital Bra; Loredana Zefi; Zuna
- Producers: Beatzarre; Djorkaeff; BuJaa

Capital Bra singles chronology
"365 Tage" (2020)	"Nicht verdient" (2020)

Loredana singles chronology
"Du bist mein" (2020)	"Nicht verdient" (2020)

Music video
- "Nicht verdient" on YouTube

"Nicht verdient" (German pronunciation: [ˈnɪçt fɛʁˈdiːnt]; transl. "Not deserving") is a song by German rapper Capital Bra and Kosovar rapper Loredana. It was released on 29 April 2020 as the lead single off Capital Bra's upcoming seventh studio album CB7 through Bra Musik. The song was written by Capital Bra, Loredana and Zuna, while production was handled by Beatzarre, Djorkaeff and BuJaa.

The song debuted at number one in Germany, becoming Capital Bra's 21st and Loredana's fifth number-one-single.

== Background and composition ==
On 15 April 2020, Capital Bra announced the release date of his upcoming album CB7 and revealed that the lead single would feature Loredana. Both artists had previously alluded at a possible collaboration by uploading a clip on the app TikTok doing the "Flip the Switch challenge". During the song, the artists rap over a "Mediterranean instrumental" about people not deserving of their love. Loredana's lyrics were interpreted as a dig at her ex-husband Mozzik.

== Music video ==
The accompanying music video was released on 30 April 2020 and was directed by Heiko Hammer. It features shots of Capital Bra posing in front of a Ferrari, Loredana in front of a dark backdrop dancing on a white dancefloor-like surface, as well as several scenes of both artists rapping together. The video amassed over 1,5 million views in just under 13 hours.

== Charts ==
=== Weekly charts ===
Chart (2020)	Peak position
Austria (Ö3 Austria Top 40)	1
Germany (GfK)	1
Switzerland (Schweizer Hitparade)	1

=== Year-end charts ===
Chart (2020)	Position
Austria (Ö3 Austria Top 40)	58

== See also ==
- List of number-one hits of 2020 (Austria)
- List of number-one hits of 2020 (Germany)
- List of number-one hits of 2020 (Switzerland)
