= Du bist mein =

2020 single by Loredana, Zuna and SRNO

Single by Loredana, Zuna and SRNO
- Language: German
- Released: 27 March 2020
- Length: 2:40
- Label: Groove Attack; Loredana
- Songwriters: Loredana Zefi; Ghassan Ramlawi
- Producer: SRNO

Loredana singles chronology
"Angst" (2020)	"Du bist mein" (2020)	"Nicht verdient" (2020)

Zuna singles chronology
"Biturbo" (2019)	"Du bist mein" (2020)

SRNO singles chronology
"3Chiri" (2019)	"Du bist mein" (2020)

Music video
- "Du bist mein" on YouTube

"Du bist mein" (pronounced [du bɪst ˈmaɪn]; transl. "You are mine") is a song by Kosovar rapper Loredana, German rapper Zuna and Dutch producer SRNO. It was released on 27 March 2020 through Groove Attack and Loredana.

Commercially, the song peaked at number one in Germany, where it became Loredana's fourth, as well as Zuna's and SRNO's first number one single.

== Background ==
The song marks the second collaboration between Loredana and Zuna, after the latter had previously co-written the song "Angst". Zefi teased the song release on 23 March 2020 by posting a clip of the song. According to her, the hook was created while being in quarantine. The project sparked further speculation about both artists possibly dating.

== Critical reception ==
Lukas Breit of Rap.de thought the song "impresses with its summery vibes" and "spreads a good mood during times of quarantine". The editors at Laut.de described the song as "simple, yet effective" while the "Dancehall-tinged beat provides an appropriate basis for Loredana's and Zuna's superficial lyrics".

== Music video ==
The accompanying music video was released on 27 March 2020 and directed by the rappers themselves. The video was filmed at Loredana's home near Lake Lucerne while her and Zuna placed themselves in self-isolation due to the COVID-19 epidemic. It features shots of both rappers, as well as a compilation of TikTok users doing dance routines to the song. The video reached more than 1,9 million views in its first 19 hours.

== Charts ==
Chart performance for "Du bist mein"
Chart (2020)	Peak position
Austria (Ö3 Austria Top 40)	2
Germany (GfK)	1
Switzerland (Schweizer Hitparade)	3

== Certifications ==
Certifications for "Du bist mein"
Region	Certification	Certified units/sales
Austria (IFPI Austria)	Gold	15,000^{‡}
Germany (BVMI)	Gold	200,000^{‡}
Switzerland (IFPI Switzerland)	Gold	10,000^{‡}
^{‡} Sales+streaming figures based on certification alone.

== See also ==
- List of number-one hits of 2020 (Germany)
