= Ich kauf' mir lieber einen Tirolerhut =

Song by Billy Mo
- Language: German
- Released: 1969
- Genre: schlager
- Songwriters: Charly Niessen, Franz Rüger

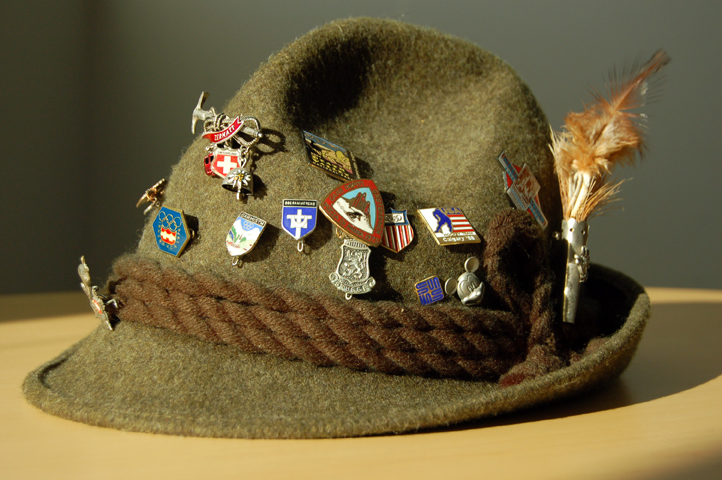
A Tyrolean hat

Ich kauf' mir lieber einen Tirolerhut is a 1962 schlager song, which became successful both as an original recording, as well as a cover-version in other languages.

== German ==
The original version, Ich kauf’ mir lieber einen Tirolerhut, was recorded by Trinidad & Tobago-West German jazz musician Billy Mo. Music and lyrics were written by Charly Niessen and Franz Rüger. On 1 February 1963, the single reached the West German singles chart, where it stayed for 12 weeks, as one of the 10 most successful, spending four weeks on first position.

In 1965, the schlager film Ich kauf' mir lieber einen Tirolerhut was released, which featured the song, and Billy Mo's appearance as an actor.

== Cover versions ==
The song was also recorded by Billy Mo himself in English as I'd Rather Buy Myself a Tyrolian Hat and in Dutch as Tiroler Hoed. In addition to other cover versions in German, the song was also recorded in Danish, by Jørgen Winckler (1963) and Ole Søltoft (1969), in Norwegian by Arne Bendiksen (1963) and Anita Hegerland (1969), and in Swedish by Östen Warnerbring (1969), as Du borde köpa dig en tyrolerhatt, with lyrics by Stikkan Anderson.

The Östen Warnerbring recording charted at Svensktoppen for eight weeks between 21 September-9 November 1969, topping the chart.
