= Cindy, Oh Cindy =

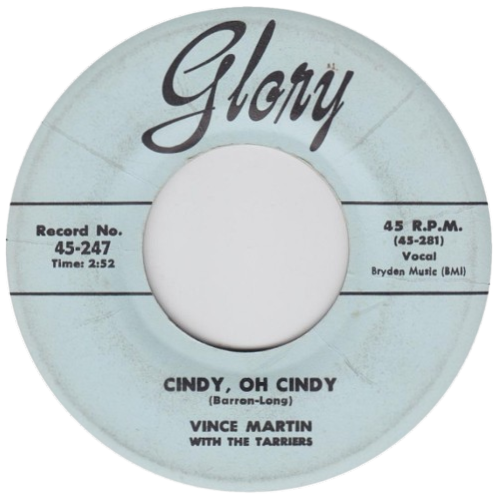

Single by Vince Martin and the Tarriers
- B-side: "Only If You Praise the Lord"
- Released: 1956
- Genre: Folk
- Length: 2:52
- Label: Glory
- Songwriters: Robert Barron a.k.a. Robert Nemiroff, Burt Long a.k.a. Burt D'Lugoff

Vince Martin singles chronology
"Cindy, Oh Cindy" (1956)	"Katie-O" (1957)

"Cindy, Oh Cindy" is a song written by Robert Nemiroff and Burt D'Lugoff and credited to their pseudonyms, Robert Barron and Burt Long. It used as its melody a stevedore song, "Pay Me My Money Down", collected by Lydia Parrish in her 1942 book Slave Songs of the Georgia Sea Islands, which was performed by The Weavers during their influential 1955 Carnegie Hall concerts and further popularized by The Kingston Trio on tour starting in 1957.

== Recordings ==
The song was originally recorded in 1956 by Vince Martin and the Tarriers, and quickly covered by Eddie Fisher. Both versions made the charts that year; for Fisher, it was the last top-40 single of his career, climbing to number 10 nationally. For Martin, it was his only top 40 entry, peaking at number nine, and he teamed with the Tarriers to record the tune by the artists' label, Glory Records. "We arranged it in a calypso style and sang behind this guy, Martin," Tarriers member Erik Darling told Wayne Jancik in The Billboard Book of One-Hit Wonders. "That was issued first before any stuff we'd do, much to our chagrin ... We didn't wanna sing with a Vince Martin. He wasn't a folksinger, in any manner or form."

The song was also covered by the American rock band The Beach Boys in 1962, although the song remained unreleased for many years. The song was eventually released on the re-release of the Surfin' Safari/Surfin' U.S.A. albums in 1990. Other versions have been recorded by Chubby Checker 1963, Tony Brent 1956, Perry Como, the Highwaymen 1960, Waylon Jennings 1969, and in German by Margot Eskens 1956.
