= David Garrick (singer) =

English singer (1945–2013)

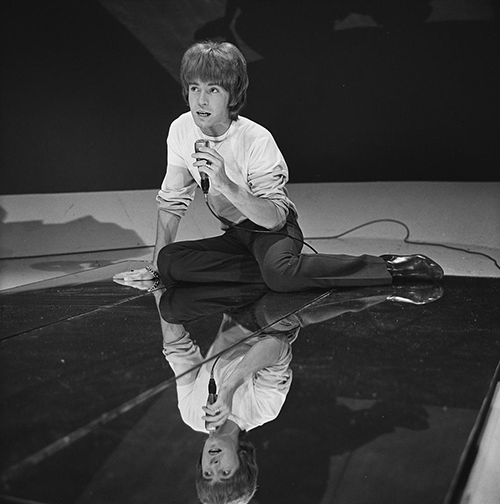
- Garrick in 1967

Background information
- Born: Philip Darrell Core (some sources list his birth name as Darrell Philip Corré); 12 September 1945; Liverpool, England
- Died: 23 August 2013 (aged 67) Wirral, England
- Genres: Rock, pop rock
- Instrument: Vocals

Philip Darrell Core (12 September 1945 – 23 August 2013), known professionally as David Garrick, was an English singer who was best known for his 1966 pop hit single, "Dear Mrs. Applebee".

== Biography ==
As a teenager, Garrick sang in a Liverpool church choir, but became interested in opera. He won a scholarship to train as an opera singer at La Scala in Milan, Italy.

He returned to Liverpool after two years, where he was frequently found at the famous Cavern Club and once improvised an opera excerpt of Pagliacci, rendering him the surname "The Opera Singer" at the club. The Kinks' manager, Robert Wace, invited Core to come to London to record a first single. He picked the name "David Garrick" as stage name, after the famous 18th-century actor and playwright.

Garrick's first two singles, "Go" (1965) and "One Little Smile" (1965), were unsuccessful. In 1966 he released a cover of the Rolling Stones song "Lady Jane", which had some airplay in the UK, reached number 28 on the UK Singles Chart, but peaked at number 5 in the Netherlands. Later that year he covered "Dear Mrs. Applebee", a relatively unknown American song first recorded by Flip Cartridge, and written by Billy Meshell and Phil Barr. Garrick's version was a hit in Germany (number 1), in the Netherlands (number 3), and Flanders (number 3), but got no higher than number 22 on the UK chart.

In following years, Garrick released numerous singles and albums but never again achieved any notable success. In Germany he had two minor hits in 1967. In 1970 he went to live in South Africa and Egypt for some years. He briefly ran a nightclub there.

In 1979, he was convicted for obtaining goods and services by deception.

In the 1990s, he returned to Europe to attempt a comeback mainly focused in Germany. In 1999, he recorded "Apassionata", produced by Mal Jefferson at Mastersound Studios, Southport, which was released on Prestige Records. He continued throughout the 1990s to perform at festivals in Germany, where he had a loyal following.

== Death ==
Garrick died in Wirral, England, on 23 August 2013, aged 67.

== Discography ==
=== Albums ===
- A Boy Called David (1967)
- Don't Go Out into The Rain Sugar (1967)
- Blow Up (Live, 1968)
- Apassionata - A Tribute to Lanza (1999)

=== Singles ===
Year	Single	Chart Positions					
Year	Single	UK	AU	AT	BE	DE	NL
1965	"Go"	—	—	—	—	—	—
1965	"One Little Smile"	—	—	—	—	—	—
1966	"Lady Jane"	28	29	—	—	—	5
1966	"Dear Mrs. Applebee"	22	42	3	4	1	3
1967	"I've Found A Love"	—	—	—	—	—	17
1967	"Please Mr. Movingman"	—	—	—	—	25	—
1967	"A Certain Misunderstanding"	—	—	—	—	—	11
1967	"Hey Mr. Möbelmann"	—	—	—	—	—	—
1967	"Don't Go Out into The Rain"	—	—	—	—	26	22
1967	"Ave Maria"	—	—	—	—	—	28
1968	"Unchained Melody"	—	—	—	—	—	14
1968	"Rainbow"	—	—	—	—	—	31
1968	"A Little Bit of This (and a Little Bit of That)"	—	—	—	—	—	Tip
1969	"Maypole Mews"	—	—	—	—	—	—
1969	"Poor Little Me"	—	—	—	—	—	—
1970	"Bake Me A Woman"	—	—	—	—	—	—
1970	"Lieber Dr. Eisenbart"	—	—	—	—	—	—
1970	"Rüdesheim liegt nicht an der Themse"	—	—	—	—	—	—
1971	"Heya Mississippi-Girl"	—	—	—	—	—	—
1971	"Mary In The Morning"	—	—	—	—	—	—
"—" denotes releases that did not chart or were not released in that territory
