= Margot Eskens =

German singer (1936–2022)

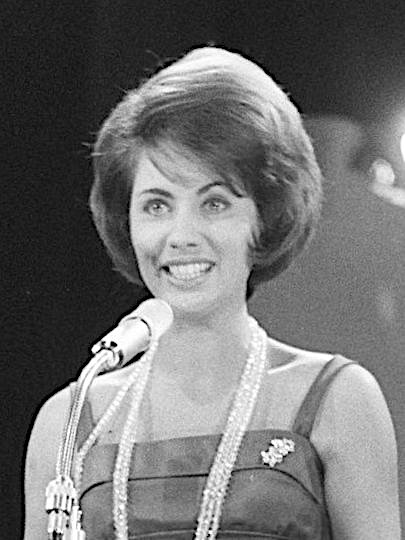
Eskens at the Kurhaus, Scheveningen in 1961

Margot Eskens (12 August 1936 – 29 July 2022) was a German Schlager singer, most popular in the 1950s and 1960s. In 1956 and 1957 she had two #1 hits, "Tiritomba" (which sold over 800,000 copies) and "Cindy, oh Cindy", which was her biggest hit, which stayed for 25 weeks in the German Singles Top 10. Several duets with Silvio Francesco, the brother of Caterina Valente, also ensued.

Eskens collaborated with producer/songwriter Kurt Feltz until 1961. She participated in the Deutscher Schlager-Festspiele in 1962, winning third place behind Conny Froboess and Siw Malmkvist. In 1966, she represented Germany in the Eurovision Song Contest and won tenth place.

At the end of the 1980s she began to record more traditional "Schlagermusik" like her album Mein Traumland am Wörthersee (1990). She continued to be a frequent guest on television programs into the 2000s.

== Early career ==
Eskens was born in Düren on 12 August 1936. Margot Eskens' father Karl Eskens was already a solo entertainer, who introduced her to the music business and the entertainment industry at an early age. In 1954, while working as a dental assistant, Eskens won a Polydor Records talent competition with the song "Moulin Rouge". A contract with Polydor followed, and as early as October 1955 she had her first hit in Germany with "Ich möcht' heut' ausgehn" ("I Would Like to Go Out Today). In the years 1956 and 1957 she had number one hits with "Tiritomba", which sold over 800,000 copies, and "Cindy, oh Cindy". Several duets with Silvio Francesco were also well received by the audience. The record of the two with the title Mondschein-Partie sold most frequently in 1959. But she also recorded popular titles with René Carol, Willy Hagara, Udo Jürgens , Will Brandes and Peter Alexander.

The Krefeld producer and lyricist Kurt Feltz, with whom Eskens worked until 1961, was responsible for this success. The new team of producers under Hans Bertram was not able to build on that, but in 1962 the song Ein Herz, das kann man nicht kaufen achieved considerable success again. With this title, Polydor sent Margot Eskens to the German Schlager Festival in 1962. There she finished third behind Conny Froboess and Siw Malmkvist.

In 1963, Heidi Brühl was nominated directly for the Eurovision Song Contest with the title Marcel . But since she had health problems which curtailed her participation, Margot Eskens also recorded the song in order to understudy in for Brühl if necessary. In 1964, Eskens took part again at the German Schlager Festival in Baden-Baden with the hit Eine Reise in the past, reaching sixth place and finishing 10th out of the 18 participants.

In the meantime she reached number eight in the charts with Mama in 1964. In the following years she was no longer one of the current hit stars. The change to the record companies CBS and Columbia was unsuccessful, and she withdrew from the popular recording business.

== Comeback and other work ==
After losing DM100,000 when the Herstatt Bank collapsed in 1974, she attempted a comeback.

This resulted in the release of the singles Life is Beautiful (1975) and Don't Think About Tomorrow (1977). Eskens didn't hit the charts with later singles and albums, but she still made appearances on stage and on television until the early 2010s.

Margot Eskens has appeared in numerous television shows and several films. She was married to her manager Karl-Heinz Münchow (1922-2011), with whom she lived for a long time on Lake Wörthersee. After the death of her husband, she withdrew from public life. She was diagnosed with dementia in 2013 and lived in a nursing home until her death.

Eskens died in 2022 just days before her 86th birthday. She was buried in Cologne's Melaten Cemetery, corridor Y (26).

== Discography ==
=== Albums ===
- 1960: Margot Eskens (25-cm-LP)
- 1963: Bonjour la France (Kompilation, u. a. mit Margot Eskens)
- 1964: Serenade der Liebe
- 1987: Dieses Gefühl
- 1990: Such' mit mir die Zärtlichkeit
- 1993: Auch Matrosen haben Heimweh
- 2009: Ich für Dich
- 2011: Achterbahn der Liebe

=== Singles ===
Hits that reached the German Top 20

- Ich möcht' heut' ausgehn, 1955, #3
- Tiritomba, 1956, #1
- Mamatschi, 1956, #9
- Cindy, oh Cindy, 1957, #1
- Calypso Italiano, 1957, #9 (with Silvio Francesco)
- Wenn du wieder mal auf Cuba bist, 1957, #12 (with Silvio Francesco)
- Wenn du wiederkommst, 1958, #11 (with Silvio Francesco)
- Himmelblaue Serenade, 1958, #8 (with Silvio Francesco)
- Du bist mir lieber als die andern, 1959, #12 (with Silvio Francesco)
- Mondschein-Partie, 1959, #5 (with Silvio Francesco)
- Wenn du heimkommst, 1961, #18
- Ein Herz, das kann man nicht kaufen, 1962, #19
- Mama, 1964, #8

==== Other singles ====
- 1956: "Mamatschi"
- 1956: "In dem kleinen Café"
- 1956: "Peterle"
- 1957: "Calypso Italiano" (with Silvio Francesco)
- 1958: "Vergiß mich nicht so schnell" (with Peter Alexander)
- 1958: "Andalusische Märchen"
- 1959: "Drei Takte Musik im Herzen"
- 1961: "Vergiß nicht, daß ich bei dir bin" (with René Carol)
- 1961: "Ich möcht' mit dir verheiratet sein" (with Will Brandes)
- 1963: "Weiße Weihnacht (White Christmas)"
- 1964: "Eine Reise in die Vergangenheit"
- 1966: "Die Zeiger der Uhr"
- 1975: "Das Leben ist schön"
- 2005: "Vom Baum gefallen"

== Filmography ==
- Auf Wiedersehen (1961)

Preceded by Ulla Wiesner with Paradies, wo bist du?	Germany in the Eurovision Song Contest; 1966	Succeeded by Inge Brück with Anouschka
