= Inner Circle discography =

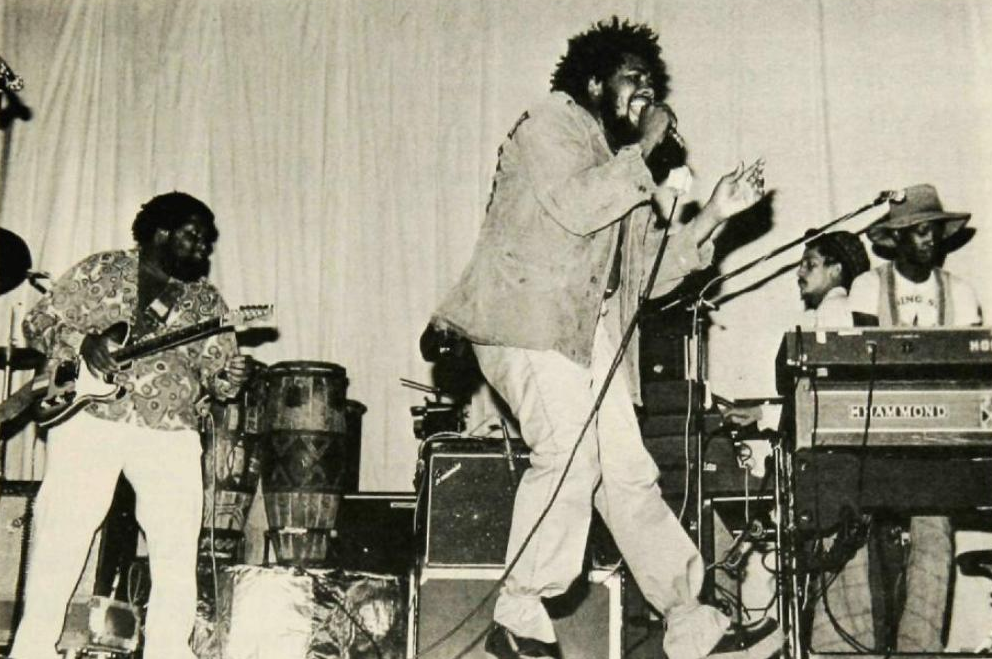
- Studio albums: 22
- Live albums: 1
- Compilation albums: 14
- Singles: 54

This is the discography for Jamaican reggae band Inner Circle.

== Studio albums ==
=== 1970s-1980s ===
Title	Album details	Notes
Dread Reggay Hits	Released: 1973; Label: Top Ranking	Released as Rock the Boat in the UK.
Heavy Reggae	Released: 1974; Label: Top Ranking	Released as Blame it on the Sun in the UK and The Inner Circle in Japan.
Reggae Thing	Released: 1976; Label: Capitol (#ST-11574)	Recorded in Kingston, Jamaica and California, USA.
Barry Biggs and the Inner Circle	Released: 1977; Label: Trojan (#TRLS142)	Split album with Barry Biggs
Ready for the World	Released: 1977; Label: Capitol (#ST-11664)	Released worldwide via Capitol Records between 1977 and 1979.
Everything is Great	Released: 1979; Label: Island (#ILPS 9558)	Recorded at Dynamic Sounds Studios in Jamaica.
New Age Music	Released: 1980; Label: Island (#ILPS 9608)	Album dedicated to Jacob Miller: 4 May 1956 – 23 March 1980.
Something So Good	Released: 1982; Label: Carrere (#67866)	Released across Europe between 1982 and 1983.
One Way	Released: 1987; Label: RAS (#RAS3030)	Released in Australasia through Festival Records in 1993. It peaked at number 109.
Identified	Released: 1989; Label: Vision (#VR-3309)	Credits include Lancelot Hall, Bernard Harvey and Calton Coffie

=== 1990s-present ===
Title	Album details	Peak chart positions											Certifications
Title	Album details	AUS	AUT	CAN	FIN	GER	NED	NZ	SWE	SWI	UK	US	Certifications
Black Roses	Released: 1990; Label: RAS (#RAS3062)	—	—	—	7	—	—	—	29	—	—	—	
Bad to the Bone Bad Boys (US version)	Released: 1992; Label: RAS (#RAS3085)	32	15	40	13	12	40	6	6	6	44	64	AUT: Gold; CAN: Platinum; GER: Gold; NZ: Gold; SWI: Platinum; US: Platinum
Reggae Dancer	Released: 1994; Label: WEA (#4509-96116)	154	14	—	21	18	42	23	12	8	—	—	
Da Bomb Speak My Language (US version)	Released: 1996; Label: WEA (#0630-15192)	171	26	—	27	—	—	—	45	31	—	—	
Jamaika Me Crazy	Released: 1998; Label: WEA (#3984-23562)	—	—	—	—	—	—	—	—	—	—	—	
State of Da World	Released: 2009; Label: WEA (#5051865-5467)	—	—	—	—	—	—	—	—	—	—	—	
"—" denotes items that did not chart or were not released in that territory.

=== Regional studio albums ===
Title	Album details	Notes
Killer Dub	Released: 1978; Label: Top Ranking	Canada and US release only.
Montego Bay	Released: 1999; Label: East/West (#AMCE-7040)	Japan only. Recorded at Inner Circle's personal Florida based studios.
Big Tings	Released: 2000; Label: VP (#VP1596)	US only. Includes tracks from Jamaika Me Crazy, Montego Bay, and Reggae Man.
Reggae Man	Released: 2000; Label: East/West (#AMCE-7155)	Japan only. Recorded at Inner Circle's personal Florida based studios.
Barefoot in Negril	Released: 2001; Label: East/West (#AMCE-7280)	Japan only. Recorded at Inner Circle's personal Florida based studios.
Log On	Released: 2002; Label: East/West (#AMCE-10001)	Japan only. Recorded at Inner Circle's personal Florida based studios.

== Live albums ==
Date	Title	Notes/Label
1995	Forward Jah Jah People	Highlights from the 9th Cartagena Festival. Charly Records.

== Compilation albums ==
Date	Title	Notes/Label
1984	Reggae Greats	Jacob Miller and Inner Circle. Island Records.
1992	The Best of Inner Circle	Featuring Jacob Miller. Island Records.
1993	The Best of Inner Circle	Trojan Records.
1993	The Best of Inner Circle	The Capitol Years 1976–1977. Capitol Records
1998	Greatest Hits	NZ: #10. Warner Music.
2000	Big in Jamaica	Inner Circle and Jacob Miller. Music Deluxe.
2002	Kool Operator	Remixes from Reggae Man, Barefoot in Negril, and Log On. Circle Sound International.
2004	This Is Crucial Reggae	Disc also contains a CD-ROM Track. Sanctuary Records.
2004	Forward Jah Jah Children	Jacob Miller and Inner Circle. Trojan Records.
2004	The Best Of (Sweat A La La La La Long)	SWE: #18. Warner Music Sweden.
2005	Mixed Up Moods	Released in Japan. Absord Records.
2007	It's Da Best of Inner Circle	Released in Japan. WEA.
2008	Da Covers!! It's Da New Best of Inner Circle	Released in Japan. WEA.
2014	The Best of Inner Circle: Everything Is Great	Spectrum Music.

== Singles ==
=== 1970s–1980s ===
Year	Title	Peak chart positions		Album
Year	Title	NED	UK	Album
1970	"Why Can't I Touch You" (with The Chosen Few)	—	—	Non-album singles
1972	"I See You" (Funky Brown and The Inner Circle Band)	—	—	Non-album singles
1973	"Dog and Bone" (Hebrew Children's & Inner Circles)	—	—	Non-album singles
1974	"Duppy Gunman"	—	—	Rock the Boat
1974	"You Make Me Feel Brand New" (as Inner Circles)	—	—	Rock the Boat
1974	"Can You Handle It?"	—	—	Blame It on the Sun
1975	"Your Kiss Is Sweet"	—	—	Blame It on the Sun
1976	"Jah Music"	—	—	Reggae Thing
1976	"Tired Fe Lick Weed in a Bush" (with Jacob Miller)	—	—	Reggae Thing
1977	"All Night Till Daylight" (with Jacob Miller)	—	—	Non-album single
1979	"Everything Is Great"	—	37	Everything Is Great
1979	"Music Machine"	28	—	Everything Is Great
1979	"Stop Breaking My Heart"	—	50	Everything Is Great
1979	"Mary Mary"	38	—	Everything Is Great
1979	"We a Rockers"	—	—	Everything Is Great
1980	"We Come to Rock You"	—	—	New Age Music
1980	"New Age Music"	—	—	New Age Music
1980	"Discipline Child"	—	—	New Age Music
1980	"Summer in the City"	—	—	New Age Music
1982	"Something So Good"	—	—	Something So Good
1986	"Groovin' in Love" (UK only)	—	—	Non-album singles
1986	"Computer Style" (Jamaica only)	—	—	Non-album singles
1986	"Massive Girl" (Jamaica only)	—	—	Non-album singles
1986	"Reggae Beat Box" (US only)	—	—	Non-album singles
1987	"Never Can Say Goodbye" (US only)	—	—	Non-album singles
1987	"One Way"	—	—	One Way
1989	"Black and White"	—	—	Identified
1989	"Bad Boys" (US only – theme from TV show Cops)	—	—	Identified
"—" denotes items that did not chart or were not released in that territory.

=== 1990s–present ===
Year	Title	Peak chart positions											Certifications	Album
Year	Title	AUS	AUT	CAN	FIN	GER	NED	NZ	SWE	SWI	UK	US	Certifications	Album
1990	"Bad Boys" (1st re-issue)	—	—	—	7	—	—	—	2	—	—	—		Black Roses
1991	"Black Roses"	—	—	—	21	—	—	—	—	—	—	—		Black Roses
1992	"Sweat (A La La La La Long)"	—	2	—	5	1	1	—	2	1	43	—	AUT: Gold; GER: Platinum; BPI: Gold	Bad to the Bone
1992	"Rock with You"	—	5	—	7	8	7	—	38	7	—	—		Bad to the Bone
1993	"Bad to the Bone"	—	—	—	—	—	—	—	—	—	—	—		Bad to the Bone
1993	"Wrapped Up in Your Love"	—	—	—	—	50	—	—	—	—	—	—		Bad to the Bone
1993	"Bad Boys" (2nd re-issue)	25	21	19	—	35	—	5	—	—	52	8	BPI: Gold; RMNZ: Gold; RIAA: Platinum	Bad Boys
1993	"Sweat (A La La La La Long)" (1st re-issue)	2	—	38	—	—	—	1	—	—	3	16	AUS: 2× Platinum; RMNZ: 2× Platinum; RIAA: Gold	Bad Boys
1993	"Rock with You" (1st re-issue)	103	—	—	—	—	—	13	—	—	—	98		Bad Boys
1994	"Hit and Run" (Sandy Reed featuring Inner Circle)	—	—	—	—	—	—	—	—	—	—	—		I Believe
1994	"Games People Play"	97	11	85	2	27	8	4	7	7	67	84	RMNZ: Gold	Reggae Dancer
1994	"Summer Jammin'"	161	—	—	—	—	—	12	—	—	—	—		Reggae Dancer
1995	"Whip It (With My Love)"	—	—	—	—	—	—	—	—	—	—	—		Reggae Dancer
1995	"Black Roses" (1st re-issue)	—	—	—	—	—	—	—	—	—	—	—		Reggae Dancer
1996	"Da Bomb"	155	20	—	7	55	—	8	7	—	—	—	RMNZ: Gold	Da Bomb
1996	"I Think I Love You"	—	—	—	—	—	—	—	—	—	—	—		Da Bomb
1997	"Tell Me (What You Want Me To Do)"	—	—	—	—	—	—	19	38	—	—	—		Da Bomb
1998	"Ob-la-di Ob-la-da"	167	—	—	20	—	—	6	—	—	—	—		Non-album single
1998	"Not About Romance"	—	—	—	—	—	—	—	—	—	—	92		Speak My Language
2004	"Sweat (A La La La La Long) 2004" (featuring Lady Saw)	—	—	—	—	—	—	—	—	—	—	—		Non-album singles
2004	"Don't Quit"	—	—	—	—	—	—	—	—	—	—	—		Non-album singles
2004	"Forward Jah Jah Children"	—	—	—	—	—	—	—	—	—	—	—		Non-album singles
2005	"One Day Christian"	—	—	—	—	—	—	—	—	—	—	—		Non-album singles
2005	"Girls Wild All Over the World"	—	—	—	—	—	—	—	—	—	—	—		Non-album singles
2008	"No Cocaine" (Slightly Stoopid and Inner Circle)	—	—	—	—	—	—	—	—	—	—	—		Non-album singles
2009	"Candy Girl (Sugar Sugar)" (featuring Flo Rida)	—	—	—	—	—	—	—	—	—	—	—		State of Da World
"—" denotes items that did not chart or were not released in that territory.
