= List of number-one hits of 2009 (Austria) =

This is a list of the Austrian number-one singles & albums of 2009.

Issue date	Song	Artist	Album	Artist
2 January	"Hot n Cold"	Katy Perry	Der Mann mit der Mundharmonika	Michael Hirte
9 January	"Hot n Cold"	Katy Perry	Der Mann mit der Mundharmonika	Michael Hirte
16 January	"Hot n Cold"	Katy Perry	Hotel Engel	DJ Ötzi
23 January	"Hot n Cold"	Katy Perry	Neujahrskonzert 2009	Daniel Barenboim / Vienna Philharmonic
30 January	"Run"	Leona Lewis	Neujahrskonzert 2009	Daniel Barenboim / Vienna Philharmonic
6 February	"Run"	Leona Lewis	Working on a Dream	Bruce Springsteen
13 February	"Run"	Leona Lewis	Working on a Dream	Bruce Springsteen
20 February	"Blown Away"	Oliver Wimmer	Working on a Dream	Bruce Springsteen
27 February	"Dance with Somebody"	Mando Diao	Give Me Fire	Mando Diao
6 March	"Poker Face"	Lady Gaga	'Stadtaffe	Peter Fox
13 March	"Poker Face"	Lady Gaga	No Line on the Horizon	U2
20 March	"Poker Face"	Lady Gaga	No Line on the Horizon	U2
27 March	"Poker Face"	Lady Gaga	The Fame	Lady Gaga
3 April	"Poker Face"	Lady Gaga	Nichts passiert	Silbermond
10 April	"Poker Face"	Lady Gaga	Nichts passiert	Silbermond
17 April	"Poker Face"	Lady Gaga	Zwischen Himmel & Erde	Andrea Berg
24 April	"Poker Face"	Lady Gaga	In dieser Stadt	Christina Stürmer
1 May	"Poker Face"	Lady Gaga	Sounds of the Universe	Depeche Mode
8 May	"Poker Face"	Lady Gaga	Together Through Life	Bob Dylan
15 May	"Poker Face"	Lady Gaga	Der Mann mit der Mundharmonika 2	Michael Hirte
22 May	"Poker Face"	Lady Gaga	Der Mann mit der Mundharmonika 2	Michael Hirte
29 May	"Anything but Love"	Daniel Schuhmacher	21st Century Breakdown	Green Day
5 June	"Primavera in anticipo (It Is My Song)"	Laura Pausini featuring James Blunt	21st Century Breakdown	Green Day
12 June	"Primavera in anticipo (It Is My Song)"	Laura Pausini featuring James Blunt	21st Century Breakdown	Green Day
19 June	"Primavera in anticipo (It Is My Song)"	Laura Pausini featuring James Blunt	Battle for the Sun	Placebo
26 June	"Primavera in anticipo (It Is My Song)"	Laura Pausini featuring James Blunt	Hannah Montana: The Movie	Various artists
3 July	"Jungle Drum"	Emilíana Torrini	The Album	Daniel Schuhmacher
10 July	"Jungle Drum"	Emilíana Torrini	King of Pop	Michael Jackson
17 July	"Jungle Drum"	Emilíana Torrini	King of Pop	Michael Jackson
24 July	"Jungle Drum"	Emilíana Torrini	King of Pop	Michael Jackson
31 July	"Jungle Drum"	Emilíana Torrini	King of Pop	Michael Jackson
7 August	"Jungle Drum"	Emilíana Torrini	King of Pop	Michael Jackson
14 August	"Jungle Drum"	Emilíana Torrini	King of Pop	Michael Jackson
21 August	"I Gotta Feeling"	The Black Eyed Peas	King of Pop	Michael Jackson
28 August	"If a Song Could Get Me You"	Marit Larsen	King of Pop	Michael Jackson
4 September	"I Gotta Feeling"	Black Eyed Peas	King of Pop	Michael Jackson
11 September	"If a Song Could Get Me You"	Marit Larsen	Die Liebe bleibt	Semino Rossi
18 September	"If a Song Could Get Me You"	Marit Larsen	Die Liebe bleibt	Semino Rossi
25 September	"If a Song Could Get Me You"	Marit Larsen	The Resistance	Muse
2 October	"Sexy Bitch"	David Guetta featuring Akon	Die Liebe bleibt	Semino Rossi
9 October	"Sexy Bitch"	David Guetta featuring Akon	Best Of	Udo Jürgens
16 October	"Sexy Bitch"	David Guetta featuring Akon	Best Of	Udo Jürgens
23 October	"Bodies"	Robbie Williams	So wie ich bin	Helene Fischer
30 October	"Bodies"	Robbie Williams	Liebe ist für alle da	Rammstein
6 November	"Bodies"	Robbie Williams	Liebe ist für alle da	Rammstein
13 November	"Bodies"	Robbie Williams	Vol. 15	Kiddy Contest
20 November	"Bodies"	Robbie Williams	Reality Killed the Video Star	Robbie Williams
27 November	"Bad Romance"	Lady Gaga	Reality Killed the Video Star	Robbie Williams
4 December	"Bad Romance"	Lady Gaga	Vol. 15	Kiddy Contest
11 December	"Bad Romance"	Lady Gaga	Vol. 15	Kiddy Contest
18 December	"Bad Romance"	Lady Gaga	The Spirit Never Dies	Falco
25 December	"Bad Romance"	Lady Gaga	The Spirit Never Dies	Falco
