= Honestly (Daniel Schuhmacher song) =

Single by Daniel Schuhmacher

from the album Nothing to Lose
- Released: November 27, 2009
- Length: 3:32
- Label: 19; 313; Columbia; Sony
- Songwriters: Peter Könemann; Alex Christensen
- Producer: Christensen

Daniel Schuhmacher singles chronology
"Anything but Love" (2009)	"Honestly" (2009)	"If It's Love" (2010)

"Honestly" is a song by German singer Daniel Schuhmacher. It was written by Alex Christensen and Peter Könemann for Schuhmacher's second studio album, Nothing to Lose (2010), while production on the track was helmed by the former. Released as the album's lead single, it peaked at number 22 on the German Singles Chart, also reaching number 62 in Austria.

== Background ==
In May 2009, Schuhmacher released his debut single "Anything but Love." Written and produced by Dieter Bohlen, it debuted at number one in Austria, Germany, and Switzerland, achieving the highest first-week sales of any single released in 2009. Bohlen and Schuhmacher subsequently collaborated on the planned follow-up single "Don't Believe," but shortly after the release of Schuhmacher's debut album, Bohlen ended their professional partnership and gave the song to Mehrzad Marashi, who later won the following season of Deutschland sucht den Superstar. The split prompted Schuhmacher to seek new creative collaborators, eventually leading him to work with producer Alex Christensen.

== Track listings ==
All tracks co-written and produced by Alex Christensen.

CD single
No.	Title	Length
1.	"Honestly" (single version)	3:32
2.	"Honestly" (acoustic version)	3:35

== Charts ==
Weekly chart performance for "Honestly"
Chart (2009)	Peak position
Austria (Ö3 Austria Top 40)	62
Germany (GfK)	22
