= Bad to the Bone (disambiguation) =

"Bad to the Bone" is a 1982 song by George Thorogood and the Destroyers.

Bad to the Bone may also refer to:

- Bad to the Bone (George Thorogood & The Destroyers album), 1982
- Bad to the Bone, a 1986 album by LA Dream Team
- Bad to the Bone (Inner Circle album), 1992, or the title song
- "Bad to the Bone" (Running Wild song), 1989
- "Bad to the Bone" (Kool G Rap & DJ Polo song), 1990
- Bad to the Bone (film), a 1997 TV movie starring Kristy Swanson, David Chokachi and Jeremy London
- "Bad to the Bone" (CSI), a fourth-season episode of the television series CSI: Crime Scene Investigation
- Bad to the Bone (novel), a 2010 novel by Jeri Smith-Ready
- "Bad to the Bone", a song by Gotthard from the 2007 album Domino Effect
