= Nothing to Lose (Daniel Schuhmacher album) =

Studio album by Daniel Schuhmacher
- Released: September 17, 2010
- Length: 47:27
- Label: 313 Music
- Producer: Beatgees; Thorsten Brötzmann; Alex Christensen; Florian Prengel; Boris Schmidt

Daniel Schuhmacher chronology
The Album (2009)	Nothing to Lose (2010)	Diversity (2013)

Nothing to Lose is the second studio album by German singer Daniel Schuhmacher. A breakaway from his 2009 debut album, it was released by independent label 313 Music on September 17, 2010 in German-speaking Europe, involving work from Beatgees, Thorsten Brötzmann, Alex Christensen, Florian Prengel, and Boris Schmidt. Nothing to Lose peaked at number 37 on the German Albums Chart.

== Background ==
In June 2009, Schuhmacher released his debut The Album through Sony Music. It debuted at number one on the German Albums Chart, and was later certified gold by the Bundesverband Musikindustrie (BVMI) with 137,000 copies sold in its first nine months, also reaching number one in Austria and number four in Switzerland. Following their collaboration on the number-one single "Anything but Love," he recorded the intended follow-up "Don't Believe," but Dieter Bohlen ultimately ended their working relationship and passed the song to Mehrzad Marashi, who went on to win the next season of Deutschland sucht den Superstar, prompting Schuhmacher to seek out new collaborators.

== Critical reception ==
Professional ratings
Review scores
Source	Rating
laut.de	3/5 stars

Dani Fromm from laut.de rated Nothing to Lose three ouf of five stars. She felt that the album represents a strong improvement over Schuhmacher's debut The Album, noting that he has "a lot gained and done many things right" by collaborating with producers who better suit his voice. Fromm highlighted tracks like "Like a Song in Your Head" and "She Loves Me" as effective dance-pop that showcase his expressive vocals and concluded that while no musical revolution is expected, Schuhmacher delivers "a good, largely danceable, and by no means embarrassing pop album," with his voice carrying sufficient range to elevate even familiar material like "Here Comes the Rain Again."

== Chart performance ==
Nothing to Lose failed to match the success of Schuhmacher's 2009 debut album The Album. It entered and peaked at number 37 on the German Albums Chart, remaining on the chart for only one week before dropping out of the top 100.

== Track listing ==
Nothing to Lose track listing
No.	Title	Writer(s)	Producer(s)	Length
1.	"Like a Song in Your Head"	Robert Habolin; Sipho Sililo; David Vogt; Philip Böllhoff; Hannes Büscher	Beatgees	3:04
2.	"She Loves Me"	Sililo; Vogt; Böllhoff; Büscher; Magnus Funemyr	Beatgees	3:14
3.	"Feel"	Sam McCarthy; Martin Sutton; Claudio Pagonis	Thorsten Brötzmann	3:30
4.	"Lalala"	Sililo; Vogt; Böllhoff; Büscher; Johan "Jones" Wetterberg; Ron Dohanetz	Beatgees	3:07
5.	"I'll Be There for You"	Sililo; Vogt; Böllhoff; Büscher; Funemyr	Beatgees	4:09
6.	"If It's Love"	Boris Schmidt; Florian Prengel	Brötzmann	3:47
7.	"All We Need Is Love"	Sililo; Vogt; Böllhoff; Büscher; Wetterberg	Beatgees	3:45
8.	"Running Through the Fire"	Emil Gotthard; Sililo; Vogt; Böllhoff; Büscher; Funemyr	Beatgees	3:58
9.	"High"	Schmidt; Prengel; Gareth Daykin	Schmidt; Prengel	3:28
10.	"Here Comes the Rain Again"	Annie Lennox; David Stewart	Dreamfactory	3:29
11.	"Another Way"	Schmidt; Prengel; Daykin	Schmidt; Prengel	3:29
12.	"A Million Miles Away"	Tom Nichols; Per Eklund; Mathias Wollo	Brötzmann	3:43
13.	"Honestly"	Alex Christensen; Peter Könemann	Christensen	3:26
Total length:				47:27

== Charts ==
Weekly chart performance for Nothing to Lose
Chart (2010)	Peak position
German Albums (Offizielle Top 100)	37
