= If It's Love =

If It's Love may refer to:

- "If It's Love" (Squeeze song), 1989
- "If It's Love" (Daniel Schuhmacher song), 2009
- "If It's Love" (Train song), 2010
- "If It's Love", a song by Sting from his album The Bridge, 2021
- "If It's Love", a song by S Club 7, a B-side of the 2000 single "Natural"
