= List of number-one singles of 1991 (Finland) =

This is the list of the number-one singles of the Finnish Singles Chart in 1991.

== History ==
Issue date	Artist	Title
January 7	Raptori	"Debi Gibson"
January 21	Raptori	"Debi Gibson"
February 4	Iron Maiden	"Bring Your Daughter... to the Slaughter"
February 18	The KLF	"3 AM Eternal"
March 4	Inner Circle	"Bad Boys"
March 18	Hausmylly	"Se mustamies"
April 2	Hausmylly	"Se mustamies"
April 15	Hausmylly	"Se mustamies"
April 29	Hausmylly	"Se mustamies"
May 13	Popeda	"Punaista ja makeaa"
May 27	London Boys	"Sweet Soul Music"
June 10	De La Soul	"Ring Ring Ring (Ha Ha Hey)"
June 24	Juice Leskinen	"Pienestä pitäen"
July 8	Eppu Normaali	"Lensin matalalla"
July 22	Guns N' Roses	"You Could Be Mine"
August 5	Bryan Adams	"(Everything I Do) I Do It for You"
August 19	Metallica	"Enter Sandman"
September 2	Guns N' Roses	"You Could Be Mine"
September 16	Guns N' Roses	"Don't Cry"
September 30	Guns N' Roses	"You Could Be Mine"
October 14	Ne Luumäet	"Onnellinen perhe"
October 28	Ne Luumäet	"Onnellinen perhe"
November 12	Ne Luumäet	"Onnellinen perhe"
November 25	Michael Jackson	"Black or White"
December 9	Sielun Veljet	"Laatikoita"
December 23	Guns N' Roses	"Live and Let Die"
