= Don't Believe =

Don't Believe may refer to:

- Don't Believe (album), a 2006 album by New Mexican Disaster Squad
- Don't Believe (song), a 2010 single by Iranian-German singer Mehrzad Marashi
- "Don't Believe", a song by Seether from Finding Beauty in Negative Spaces
