= Calton Coffie =

Jamaican vocalist (1954–2023)

Calton Sylvester Coffie (27 February 1954 – 2 February 2023) was a Jamaican vocalist who rose to prominence for his work in the Jamaican-based recording act Inner Circle, but had also recorded as a solo vocalist.

Coffie was active in the reggae group from 1986 to 1994, when he began performing under the moniker Hot Cup of Coffie, based in the United Kingdom. For a brief period, his career was put on hold due to health problems. Coffie is perhaps best known for providing vocals for their smash hit single "Sweat (A La La La La Long)", which entered the European charts upon its release. His four-decade career yielded one Grammy Award and two nominations, for "Sweat (A La La La La Long)", "Bad Boys", and "Reggae Dancer".

Coffie battled diabetes in later years. He died on 2 February 2023, at the age of 68.
