= Don't Believe (song) =

Single by Mehrzad Marashi

from the album New Life
- Released: 18 April 2010
- Length: 3:01
- Label: Sony BMG
- Songwriter: Dieter Bohlen
- Producer: Dieter Bohlen

Mehrzad Marashi singles chronology
"Don't Believe" (2010)	"Sweat (A La La La La Long)" (2010)

"Don't Believe" is a song by German singer Mehrzad Marashi, the winner of the seventh season of Deutschland sucht den Superstar, the German version of Pop Idol. Written and produced by DSDS jury member Dieter Bohlen, it reached the top of the charts in Austria, Germany, and Switzerland and was later included on his debut album New Life (2010).

== Background ==
Dieter Bohlen initially wrote "Don't Believe" for Daniel Schuhmacher, the winner of the sixth season of Deutschland sucht den Superstar. It was expected to be released as Schuhmacher's second single following their collaboration on the number-one hit "Anything but Love" and the parent album The Album (2009). However, although Schuhmacher recorded the song, his version remained unreleased after Bohlen decided to discontinue his working relationship with him, and the track ultimately ended up in the vault before Bohlen later offered it to Mehrzad Marashi. Schuhmacher later acknowledged that, although he liked the song, he had criticized its drum pattern, which contributed to a fallout with Bohlen.

== Chart performance ==
For the first time in the history of the Deutschland sucht den Superstar franchise, "Don't Believe" was made available for digital download immediately following the live broadcast. Within its first 24 hours of release, it achieved higher sales than any previous song issued from the series at that point. An immediate commercial success, the single sold more than 100,000 copies during its first five days of availability. The song subsequently reached number one on the singles charts in Germany, Austria, and Switzerland, while also topping the Luxembourg Digital Songs chart.

== Music video ==
A music video for "Don't Believe" was filmed over the course of one week in April 2010 in New York City. It premiered worldwide on BILD.de and the official RTL website. Throughout the video, Marashi performs at various locations across New York, featuring iconic landmarks such as the Statue of Liberty, the city skyline, and Rodeo Drive. Filming was delayed due to the eruptions of Eyjafjallajökull and the resulting disruptions to air travel.

== Track listings ==
2-Track Single

1. "Don't Believe" (Single Version) – 3:01
2. "Don't Believe" (Karaoke Version) – 3:01

== Charts ==
=== Weekly charts ===
Weekly chart performance for "Don't Believe"
Chart (2010)	Peak position
Austria (Ö3 Austria Top 40)	1
Eurochart Hot 100 Singles (Billboard)	6
Germany (GfK)	1
Luxembourg Digital Songs (Billboard)	1
Switzerland (Schweizer Hitparade)	1

=== Year-end charts ===
Weekly chart performance for "Don't Believe"
Chart (2010)	Position
Austria (Ö3 Austria Top 40)	25
European Hot 100 Singles (Billboard)	99
Germany (GfK)	13
Switzerland (Schweizer Hitparade)	66

== Certifications ==
Certifications for "Don't Believe"
Region	Certification	Certified units/sales
Germany (BVMI)	Gold	150,000^{^}
^{*} Sales figures based on certification alone.^{^} Shipments figures based on certification alone.
