= Deutschland sucht den Superstar season 7 =

German music competition television series (2010)

Deutschland sucht den Superstar
- Season 7
- Hosted by: Marco Schreyl
- Judges: Dieter Bohlen; Nina Eichinger; Volker Neumüller; Sylvie van der Vaart (final only)
- Winner: Mehrzad Marashi
- Runner-up: Menowin Fröhlich

Release
- Original network: RTL
- Original release: 6 January – 17 April 2010

Season chronology
- ← Previous; Season 6 Next → Season 8

The seventh season of Deutschland sucht den Superstar was aired on German channel RTL from 6 January to 17 April 2010. The season marked a new national record with more than 35,000 participants. The season's winner was Mehrzad Marashi.

== Way to the Top 15 ==
=== Auditions ===
The seven Audition episodes were shown every Wednesday and Saturday from 6 January 2010 until 27 January 2010. Open auditions were held in the five cities Frankfurt, Munich, Cologne, Berlin and Hamburg, and in September and October 2009, an auditions truck visited the fifteen cities Freiburg, Mannheim, Stuttgart, Würzburg, Regensburg, Dortmund, Münster, Kassel, Erfurt, Dresden, Halle, Hanover, Bremen, Kiel and Rostock.

=== "Recall" ===
The recall had 3 phases. The first phase was shot in a theater in Cologne. The 120 singers were split into 2 groups: Boys and Girls. Then every singer sang his favorite song. After that 55 singers were eliminated and the remaining singers sang in groups to get one of the 35 tickets for the next phase.

The second phase was shot in the Caribbean. The 35 singers sang three times: unaccompanied, in groups and in duos. The Top 25 came into the third phase.

The third and last phase was shot in the Schlosstheater Schwetzingen. The singers sang one song on their own. Then the jury decided which 15 singers came into the Top 15 live-show.

In this season, some of the contestants that had made it to the Top 15 had featured in previous seasons. Helmut Orosz made it to the Top 50 in season two but missing out on the Top 10 during the public vote. Menowin Fröhlich made it to the Top 20 shows in season 3 but was disqualified after being arrested and serving a two-year jail sentence. Kim Debkowski made it to the recall of the previous season but was eliminated after the group performance.

=== Songs in "Recall 3" by the Top 10 ===
- Mehrzad Marashi – "She's Like the Wind"
- Menowin Fröhlich – "I Just Called to Say I Love You"
- Manuel Hoffmann – "Get Here"
- Kim Debkowski – "If I Ain't Got You"
- Thomas Karaoglan – "Stand by Me"
- Helmut Orosz – "Back to You"
- Ines Redjeb – "Release Me"
- Nelson Sangare – "U Got It Bad"
- Marcel Pluschke – "Blowin' in the Wind"
- Steffi Landerer – "Because the Night"

== Finalists ==
(Ages stated at time of contest)

Contestant	Age	Hometown	Voted off	Liveshow theme
Mehrzad Marashi	29	Hamburg	Winner	Grand Finale
Menowin Fröhlich	22	Darmstadt	17 April 2010	Grand Finale
Manuel Hoffmann	19	Braunfels	20 March 2010; 10 April 2010	Hits in Germany and England; Boy Bands, Music Heroes & No. 1 Hits
Kim Debkowski	17	Hamburg	3 April 2010	New Hits & Old Hits
Thomas Karaoglan	16	Duisburg	27 March 2010	Ballads & Ballermann
Helmut Orosz	30	Braunschweig	Disqualified	
Ines Redjeb	22	Hamburg	13 March 2010	The 80s
Nelson Sangare	24	Aachen	6 March 2010	Happy Holiday Hits
Marcel Pluschke	19	Linnich	27 February 2010	All Time's Greatest Pop Hymns
Steffi Landerer	19	Fürstenwalde	20 February 2010	Today's Megahits

== Live shows ==
=== Top 15 – "Jetzt oder nie" (Now or Never) ===
Original airdate: 13 February 2010

Contestant	Song (Artist)	Percentage of calls
Menowin Fröhlich	I'll Be There (Jackson 5)	22,8% (2/15)
Helmut Orosz	Summer of '69 (Bryan Adams)	6,0% (5/15)
Mehrzad Marashi	Und wenn ein Lied (Söhne Mannheims)	27,3% (1/15)
Nelson Sangare	Let Me Love You (Mario)	7,5% (4/15)
Kevin Reichmann	Señorita (Justin Timberlake)	1,7% (12/15)
Marcel Pluschke	Country Roads (Hermes House Band)	2,6% (10/15)
Manuel Hoffmann	You Don't Know (Milow)	5,8% (6/15)
Thomas Karaoglan	My Girl (The Temptations)	9,3% (3/15)
Dirk Petry	Yesterday (The Beatles)	1,6% (13/15)
Kim Debkowski	Can't Fight the Moonlight (LeAnn Rimes)	4,2% (7/15)
Naomi Marte	Irgendwie, irgendwo, irgendwann (Nena)	1,3% (14/15)
Ines Redjeb	Release Me (Agnes)	3,6% (8/15)
Celine Denefleh	Symphonie (Silbermond)	2,3% (11/15)
Steffi Landerer	I Love Rock 'n' Roll (Britney Spears)	2,8% (9/15)
Maria Elena Valencia	Let's Get Loud (Jennifer Lopez)	1,2% (15/15)

Advancing to Top 10 (Public votes): Thomas, Nelson, Menowin, Kim, Mehrzad, Helmut, Manuel

Advancing to Top 10 (Jury selection): Marcel, Ines, Steffi

In this season the Top 10 was supposed to be formed by the Top 7 of the viewers vote plus 3 candidates picked by the jury (from the remaining 8 contestants). As a tribute to the viewers' support and the great success of the season the jury denied to choose advancing candidates. Instead they sent the 8th, 9th and 10th of the public vote. That also explains the gender ratio of the Top 10.

=== Top 10 – "Die Megahits von heute" (Today's Megahits) ===
Original airdate: 20 February 2010

Contestant	Song (Artist)	Percentage of calls
Menowin Fröhlich	Change (Daniel Merriweather)	37,4% (1/10)
Helmut Orosz	I'll Be Waiting (Lenny Kravitz)	6,2% (6/10)
Mehrzad Marashi	Broken Strings (James Morrison)	14,6% (2/10)
Nelson Sangare	Closer (Ne-Yo)	6,3% (5/10)
Steffi Landerer	I Kissed a Girl (Katy Perry)	3,2% (10/10)
Marcel Pluschke	Ein Kompliment (Sportfreunde Stiller)	3,3% (9/10)
Manuel Hoffmann	Pflaster (Ich + Ich)	4,0% (8/10)
Thomas Karaoglan	Monsta (Culcha Candela)	12,7% (3/10)
Ines Redjeb	I Like (Keri Hilson)	5,0% (7/10)
Kim Debkowski	Take a Bow (Rihanna)	7,3% (4/10)

- Jury Elimination Forecast: Steffi Landerer or Marcel Pluschke
- Bottom 4: Ines Redjeb, Steffi Landerer, Helmut Orosz and Nelson Sangare
- Eliminated: Steffi Landerer

=== Top 9 – "Die größten Pop-Hymnen aller Zeiten" (All Time's Greatest Pop-Hymns) ===
Original airdate: 27 February 2010

Contestant	Song (Artist)	Percentage of calls
Nelson Sangare	What a Wonderful World (Louis Armstrong)	10,9% (4/9)
Ines Redjeb	What a Feeling (Irene Cara)	4,8% (7/9)
Menowin Fröhlich	We are the World (USA for Africa)	36,2% (1/9)
Marcel Pluscke	Live is Life (Opus)	3,6% (9/9)
Kim Debkowski	Fame (Irene Cara)	7,4% (6/9)
Helmut Orosz	It's My Life (Bon Jovi)	11,4% (3/9)
Mehrzad Marashi	One (U2)	9,2% (5/9)
Thomas Karaoglan	Looking for Freedom (David Hasselhoff)	12,4% (2/9)
Manuel Hoffmann	Wind of Change (The Scorpions)	4,1% (8/9)

- Jury Elimination Forecast: Marcel Pluschke or Ines Redjeb (Nina), Ines Redjeb (Volker), Ines Redjeb, Marcel Pluschke or Kim Debkowski (Dieter)
- Bottom 4: Kim Debkowski, Ines Redjeb, Marcel Pluschke and Nelson Sangare
- Eliminated: Marcel Pluschke

=== Top 8 – "Happy Holiday Hits" ===
Original airdate: 6 March 2010

Contestant	Song (Artist)	Percentage of calls
Thomas Karaoglan	Mamacita (Mark Medlock)	15,5% (3/8)
Helmut Orosz	"Summer in the City" (Joe Cocker)	8,2% (5/8)
Menowin Fröhlich	Maria Maria (Santana)	26,0% (1/8)
Ines Redjeb	When Love Takes Over (David Guetta & Kelly Rowland)	7,9% (6/8)
Kim Debkowski	La Isla Bonita (Madonna)	9,3% (4/8)
Manuel Hoffmann	Lady (Hear Me Tonight) (Modjo)	7,6% (7/8)
Mehrzad Marashi	Fresh (Kool & The Gang)	18,7% (2/8)
Nelson Sangare	Summer Jam (The Underdog Project)	6,8% (8/8)

- Jury Elimination Forecast: Manuel Hoffmann (Nina, Volker), Kim Debkowski or Manuel Hoffmann (Dieter)
- Bottom 4: Ines Redjeb, Nelson Sangare, Manuel Hoffmann and Kim Debkowski
- Eliminated: Nelson Sangare

=== Top 7 – "80s" ===
Original airdate: 13 March 2010

Contestant	Song (Artist)	Percentage of calls
Mehrzad Marashi	Hello (Lionel Richie)	14,0% (2/7)
Manuel Hoffmann	Ohne dich (Münchener Freiheit)	8,2% (5/7)
Kim Debkowski	Eternal Flame (The Bangles)	8,2% (6/7)
Thomas Karaoglan	YMCA (Village People)	11,8% (3/7)
Helmut Orosz	Hungry Eyes (Eric Carmen)	9,1% (4/7)
Menowin Fröhlich	Billie Jean (Michael Jackson)	42,6% (1/7)
Ines Redjeb	Like a Prayer (Madonna)	6,1% (7/7)

- Jury Elimination Forecast: Manuel Hoffmann or Ines Redjeb
- Bottom 4: Helmut Orosz, Ines Redjeb, Manuel Hoffmann and Kim Debkowski
- Eliminated: Ines Redjeb

=== Top 6 – "Deutsch vs. Englisch" (German vs. English) ===
Original airdate: 20 March 2010

Contestant	Song (Artist)	Percentage of calls
Helmut Orosz	(I Can't Get No) Satisfaction (The Rolling Stones)	12,4% (4/6)
Helmut Orosz	1000 und eine Nacht (Klaus Lage)	12,4% (4/6)
Thomas Karaoglan	Relight My Fire (Take That & Lulu)	11,4% (5/6)
Thomas Karaoglan	Hamma (Culcha Candela)	11,4% (5/6)
Manuel Hoffmann	Life is a Rollercoaster (Ronan Keating)	9,8% (6/6)
Manuel Hoffmann	Bilder von dir (Laith Al-Deen)	9,8% (6/6)
Kim Debkowski	Can't Get You Out of My Head (Kylie Minogue)	16,7% (3/6)
Kim Debkowski	Krieger des Lichts (Silbermond)	16,7% (3/6)
Menowin Fröhlich	If You Don't Know Me by Now (Simply Red)	27,8% (1/6)
Menowin Fröhlich	Über sieben Brücken musst du gehen (Peter Maffay)	27,8% (1/6)
Mehrzad Marashi	Beggin' (Madcon)	21,9% (2/6)
Mehrzad Marashi	Flugzeuge im Bauch (Herbert Grönemeyer)	21,9% (2/6)

- Jury Elimination Forecast: Helmut Orosz
- Bottom 3: Helmut Orosz, Manuel Hoffmann and Thomas Karaoglan
- Eliminated: Manuel Hoffmann

On the following day, Helmut Orosz was disqualified from the competition after admitting to taking drugs during the competition. Just as done in season 4, the person who was eliminated the past week would be brought back into the competition; in which Manuel Hoffmann advanced to the top 5.

=== Top 5 – "Balladen & Ballermann" (Ballads & Ballermann) ===
Original airdate: 27 March 2010

Contestant	Song (Artist)	Percentage of calls
Menowin Fröhlich	What is Love (Haddaway)	27,3% (1/5)
Menowin Fröhlich	How Deep Is Your Love (Bee Gees)	27,3% (1/5)
Thomas Karaoglan	Das geht ab (Frauenarzt und Manny Marc)	13,4% (5/5)
Thomas Karaoglan	Stand by Me (Ben E. King)	13,4% (5/5)
Mehrzad Marashi	Mr. Boombastic (Shaggy)	18,4% (3/5)
Mehrzad Marashi	Hard to Say I'm Sorry (Chicago)	18,4% (3/5)
Kim Debkowski	Du hast mich tausendmal belogen (Andrea Berg)	15,5% (4/5)
Kim Debkowski	Almost Lover (A Fine Frenzy)	15,5% (4/5)
Manuel Hoffmann	Ein Stern (der deinen Namen trägt) (DJ Ötzi)	25,4% (2/5)
Manuel Hoffmann	Sorry Seems to be the Hardest Word (Elton John)	25,4% (2/5)

- Jury Elimination Forecast: Manuel Hoffmann, Kim Debkowski or Thomas Karaoglan
- Bottom 3: Manuel Hoffmann, Kim Debkowski and Thomas Karaoglan
- Eliminated: Thomas Karaoglan

=== Top 4 – "Neue Hits & Alte Hits " (New Hits & Old Hits) ===
Original airdate: 3 April 2010

Contestant	Song (Artist)	Percentage of calls
Manuel Hoffmann	A Walk in the Park (Nick Straker)	24,2% (3/4)
Manuel Hoffmann	Chasing Cars (Snow Patrol)	24,2% (3/4)
Kim Debkowski	Yes Sir, I Can Boogie (Baccara)	15,7% (4/4)
Kim Debkowski	Evacuate the Dancefloor (Cascada)	15,7% (4/4)
Mehrzad Marashi	Unchained Melody (The Righteous Brothers)	24,2% (2/4)
Mehrzad Marashi	Crazy (Gnarls Barkley)	24,2% (2/4)
Menowin Fröhlich	Celebration (Kool & the Gang)	35,9% (1/4)
Menowin Fröhlich	Ayo Technology (Milow)	35,9% (1/4)

- Jury Elimination Forecast: Menowin Fröhlich or Kim Debkowski (Nina & Volker), Kim Debkowski (Dieter)
- Bottom 2: Kim Debkowski and Manuel Hoffmann
- Eliminated: Kim Debkowski

=== Top 3 – Semi Final (Boygroups, Music Hero & Number 1 Hits) ===
Original airdate: 10 April 2010

Contestant	Song (Artist)	Percentage of calls
Menowin Fröhlich	No Matter What (Boyzone)	38,6% (1/3)
Menowin Fröhlich	You Are the Sunshine of My Life (Stevie Wonder)	38,6% (1/3)
Menowin Fröhlich	I Swear (All-4-One)	38,6% (1/3)
Manuel Hoffmann	Human (The Killers)	23,7% (3/3)
Manuel Hoffmann	Englishman in New York (Sting)	23,7% (3/3)
Manuel Hoffmann	Reality (Richard Sanderson)	23,7% (3/3)
Mehrzad Marashi	End of the Road (Boyz II Men)	37,7% (2/3)
Mehrzad Marashi	Runaway (Del Shannon)	37,7% (2/3)
Mehrzad Marashi	Ich kenne Nichts (Xavier Naidoo) feat (RZA)	37,7% (2/3)

- Live-Act: "Real Love" by Mark Medlock
- Jury Elimination Forecast: Manuel Hoffmann (Nina), No Forecast (Dieter & Volker)
- Bottom 2: Manuel Hoffmann and Mehrzad Marashi
- Eliminated: Manuel Hoffmann

=== Top 2 – Final (Contestant's Choice, Highlight Song & Winner's Single) ===
Original airdate: 17 April 2010

Contestant	Song (Artist)	Percentage of calls
Menowin Fröhlich	That's What Friends Are For (Dionne Warwick)	43,6% (2/2)
Menowin Fröhlich	Billie Jean (Michael Jackson)	43,6% (2/2)
Menowin Fröhlich	Don't Believe (Winner's Single (Dieter Bohlen))	43,6% (2/2)
Mehrzad Marashi	Endless Love (Lionel Richie)	56,4% (1/2)
Mehrzad Marashi	Fresh (Kool & The Gang)	56,4% (1/2)
Mehrzad Marashi	Don't Believe (Winner's Single (Dieter Bohlen))	56,4% (1/2)

Judges' forecasts of who would win: Menowin Fröhlich

Winner: Mehrzad Marashi

Runner-up: Menowin Fröhlich

== Group song ==
- Top 10: "I Gotta Feeling" by The Black Eyed Peas
- Top 9: "The Final Countdown" by Europe
- Top 8: "Ritmo de la noche" by Chocolate
- Top 7: "Wake Me Up Before You Go-Go" by Wham!
- Top 6: "Let Me Entertain You" by Robbie Williams
- Top 5: "Hey! Baby" by DJ Ötzi
- Top 4: "Crying at the Discoteque" by Alcazar
- Top 3: "Love Is Gone" by David Guetta
- Top 2: "I Gotta Feeling" by The Black Eyed Peas – performed by all Top 10 contestants (with the exception of Helmut Orosz) and "I Came for You" (performed by the two finalists) by The Disco Boys

== Elimination chart ==
Legend
Female	Male	Top 15	Top 10	Winner

Safe	Safe First	Safe Last	Eliminated

Stage:		Top 15	Finals								
Week:		2/13	2/20	2/27	3/6	3/13	3/20	3/27	4/3	4/10	4/17
Place	Contestant	Result									
1	Mehrzad Marashi	Viewers						Btm 3		Btm 2	Winner
2	Menowin Fröhlich	Viewers									Runner-Up
3	Manuel Hoffmann	Viewers	Btm 3	Btm 2	Btm 2	Btm 3	Elim		Btm 2	Elim	
4	Kim Debkowski	Viewers				Btm 2		Btm 2	Elim		
5	Thomas Karaoglan	Viewers					Btm 2	Elim			
6	Helmut Orosz	Viewers					DQ				
7	Ines Redjeb	Viewers		Btm 3	Btm 3	Elim					
8	Nelson Sangare	Viewers			Elim						
9	Marcel Pluschke	Viewers	Btm 2	Elim							
10	Steffi Landerer	Viewers	Elim								
11-15	Celine Denefleh	Elim									
11-15	Kevin Reichmann	Elim									
11-15	Dirk Petry	Elim									
11-15	Naomi Marte	Elim									
11-15	Maria Elena Valenica	Elim									

- On 13 February, it was supposed that the viewers would choose seven finalists and the judges three. The judges, or better said Dieter Bohlen, however chose to not decide and therefore the next three highest vote getters made it through to the finals automatically. They were Ines Redjeb, Marcel Pluschke and Steffi Landerer.
- Helmut Orosz was expelled from the competition due to his drug abuse shown in a video. Therefore, Manuel Hoffmann, who was voted off the last in the competition, was brought back as the replacement.
