= New Life (Mehrzad Marashi album) =

Studio album by Mehrzad Marashi
- Released: 11 June 2010
- Length: 44:03
- Label: Sony
- Producer: Dieter Bohlen

Mehrzad Marashi chronology
New Life (2010)	Change Up (2011)

New Life is the debut album by German singer Mehrzad Marashi, the winner of the seventh season of Deutschland Sucht Den Superstar, the German version of American Idol. It was released by Sony Music on 11 June 2010. Entirely produced by DSDS judge Dieter Bohlen, the album features Marashi's coronation song "Don't Believe" as well as this number-two hit "Sweat (A La La La La Long)."

== Critical reception ==
Professional ratings
Review scores
Source	Rating
laut.de	1/5 stars

Danni Fromm from laut.de rated the album one out of five stars. She criticized New Life as a heavily derivative and commercially manufactured pop project, arguing that Dieter Bohlen recycles musical ideas and offers little original songwriting, from "modrige Modern Talking" fare to formulaic ballads like "Don’t Believe." She concluded that Marashi was ultimately wasted in a system driven by "the DSDS fan community."

== Chart performance ==
New Life debuted and peaked at number five on the German Albums Chart, becoming the first album by a Deutschland sucht den Superstar winner since second-season winner Elli Erl's 2004 album Shout It Out not to reach the top position. It also reached number three on the Austrian Albums Chart, and number nine on the Swiss Albums Chart.

== Track listing ==
All tracks produced by Dieter Bohlen.

New Life track listing
No.	Title	Writer(s)	Length
1.	"Don't Believe"	Dieter Bohlen	3:29
2.	"Everytime You Go Away"	Bohlen	4:25
3.	"Roodie Roodie"	Bohlen	3:31
4.	"You're My Heart"	Bohlen	3:58
5.	"Sweat (A La La La La Long)" (with Mark Medlock)	Ian Lewis	3:50
6.	"You're the One"	Bohlen	3:39
7.	"Please Don't Go"	Bohlen	3:36
8.	"Saturday Night"	Bohlen	3:28
9.	"I Love You"	Bohlen	3:12
10.	"You and I"	Bohlen	3:27
11.	"As Long as You Love Me"	Bohlen	3:47
12.	"Here I Stand"	Bohlen	3:28
Total length:			44:03

== Charts ==
Weekly chart performance for New Life
Chart (2010)	Peak position
Austrian Albums (Ö3 Austria)	3
German Albums (Offizielle Top 100)	5
Swiss Albums (Schweizer Hitparade)	9
