= If It's Love (Daniel Schuhmacher song) =

Single by Daniel Schuhmacher

from the album Nothing to Lose
- Released: March 26, 2010
- Length: 3:47
- Label: 313; Sony
- Songwriters: Boris Schmidt; Florian Prengel
- Producer: Thorsten Brötzmann

Daniel Schuhmacher singles chronology
"Honestly" (2009)	"If It's Love" (2010)	"Feel" (2010)

"If It's Love" is a song by German singer Daniel Schuhmacher. It was written by Boris Schmidt and Florian Prengel and produced by Thorsten Brötzmann for Schuhmacher's second studio album, Nothing to Lose (2010). Released as the album's second single, it reached number thirty on the German Albums Chart.

== Track listings ==
All tracks produced by Thorsten Brötzmann.

CD single
No.	Title	Writer(s)	Length
1.	"If It's Love"	Boris Schmidt; Florian Prengel	3:42
2.	"A Million Miles Away"	Mathias Wollo; Tom Nichols; Per Eklund	3:43

== Charts ==
Weekly chart performance for "If It's Love"
Chart (2010)	Peak position
Germany (GfK)	30
