= Mehrzad Marashi =

German singer

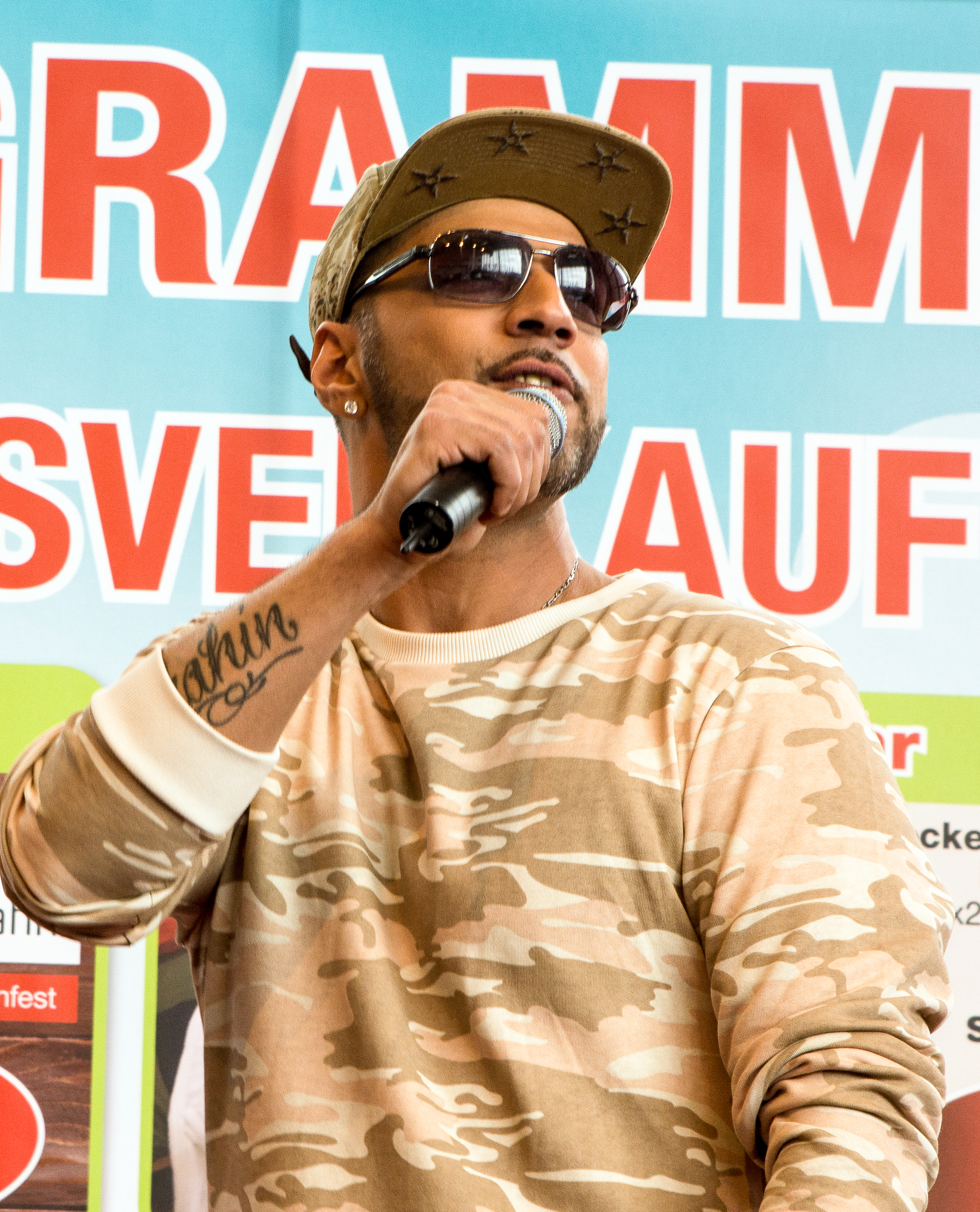

Background information
- Born: 20 September 1980 (age 45); Tehran, Iran
- Origin: Hamburg, West Germany
- Genres: Pop, soul
- Occupation: Singer
- Years active: 2006–present
- Label: Sony Music Germany
- Website: mehrzad-marashi.tv

Mehrzad Marashi (born 20 September 1980) is a German singer of Iranian descent and the winner of Deutschland sucht den Superstar season 7.

== Early life ==
Born in Tehran, Iran where his father was in the military profession during the Shah's regime, the family immigrated to Germany for political reasons when Mehrzad was six, residing in Hamburg. At 13 he joined a gospel choir and eventually took classes at the Sängerakademie, studying voice and piano. Taking the stage name "Marasco", he released self-produced recordings finding some limited success. He recorded "She's Gone", a cover of "She's Like the Wind" from Patrick Swayze. He opened a karaoke bar, but the business went bankrupt and he had to live on welfare for a while.

== Deutschland sucht den Superstar ==
Marashi auditioned to the seventh season of the show Deutschland sucht den Superstar initially under his stage name "Marasco". Very notably during a live show on DSDS on 10 April 2010, during the Top 3 stage, Marashi proposed to marry his girlfriend. The two married on 7 July 2010 in Hamburg. He eventually won against other finalist Menowin Fröhlich with 56.4% of the public vote.

=== DSDS performances ===
Theme (date)	Song	Original artist	Percentage/Place
The Top 15 — Now or Never (13 February 2010)	Und wenn ein Lied	Xavier Naidoo	27.3% (1/15)
Top 10 - Mega Hits from today (20 February 2010)	Broken Strings	James Morrison	14.6% (2/10)
Top 9 — The biggest pop songs(27 February 2010)	One	U2	9.2% (5/9)
Top 8 — Happy Holiday Hits (6 March 2010)	Fresh	Kool & the Gang	18.7% (2/8)
Top 7 — 80s (13 March 2010)	Hello	Lionel Richie	14.0% (2/7)
Top 6 — German vs. English (20 March 2010)	Flugzeuge im Bauch	Herbert Grönemeyer	21.9% (2/6)
Top 6 — German vs. English (20 March 2010)	Beggin'	Madcon	21.9% (2/6)
Top 5 — Ballermann vs. Balladen (27 March 2010)	Boombastic	Shaggy	18.4% (3/5)
Top 5 — Ballermann vs. Balladen (27 March 2010)	Hard to Say I'm Sorry	Chicago	18.4% (3/5)
Top 4 — Old vs. New (3 April 2010)	Unchained Melody	The Righteous Brothers	24.2% (2/4)
Top 4 — Old vs. New (3 April 2010)	Crazy	Gnarls Barkley	24.2% (2/4)
Top 3 — Boy bands, Music Heros & Number 1 Hits (10 April 2010)	End of the Road	Boyz II Men	37.7% (2/3)
Top 3 — Boy bands, Music Heros & Number 1 Hits (10 April 2010)	Runaway	Del Shannon	37.7% (2/3)
Top 3 — Boy bands, Music Heros & Number 1 Hits (10 April 2010)	Ich kenne Nichts	Xavier Naidoo feat RZA	37.7% (2/3)
Top 2 — Finale — Singer's choice, Highlight Song, Winner's Single (17 April 2010)	Endless Love	Lionel Richie	56.4% (1/2)
Top 2 — Finale — Singer's choice, Highlight Song, Winner's Single (17 April 2010)	Fresh	Kool & the Gang	56.4% (1/2)
Top 2 — Finale — Singer's choice, Highlight Song, Winner's Single (17 April 2010)	Don't Believe	Mehrzad Marashi	56.4% (1/2)

== After DSDS ==
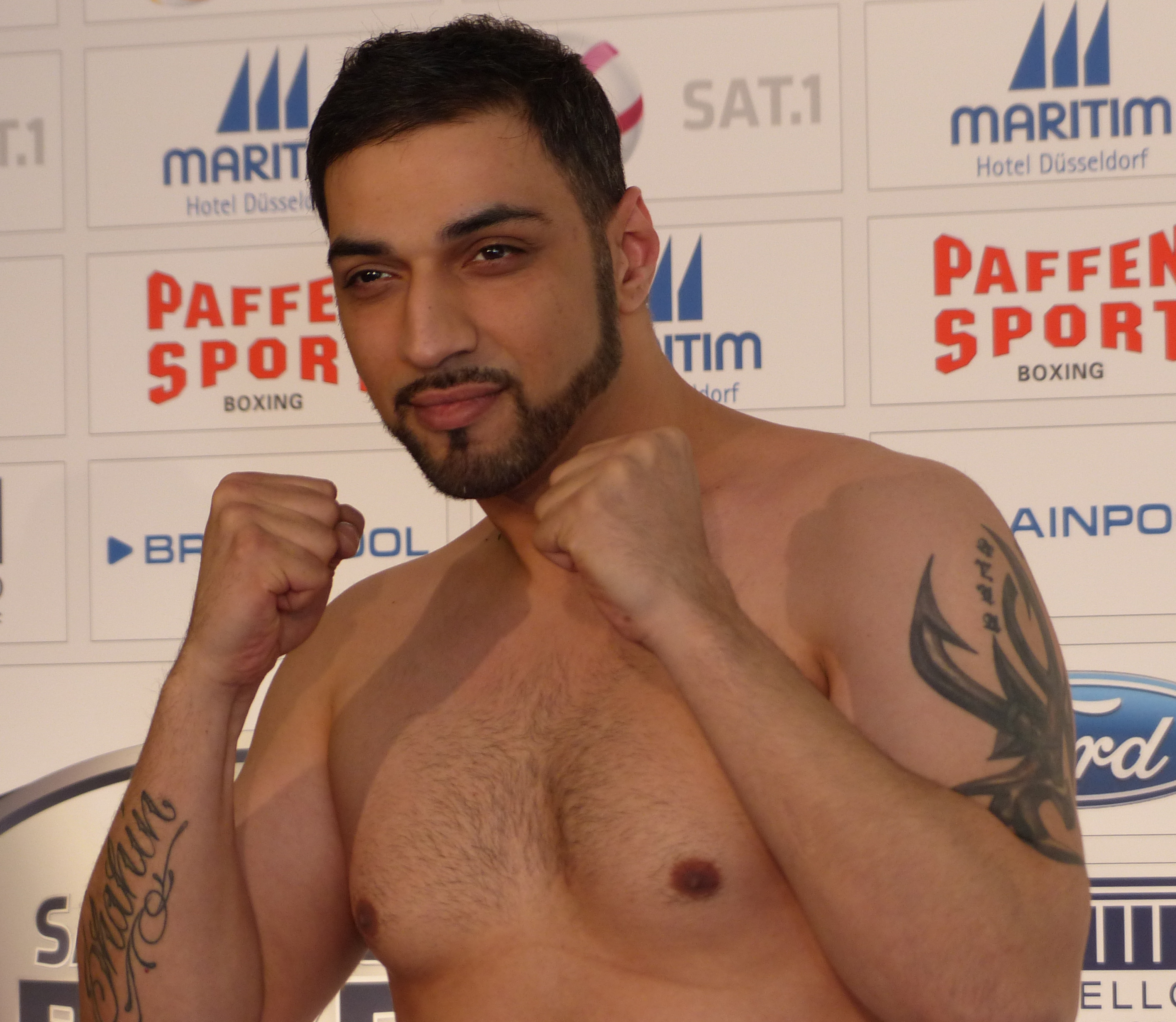
Marashi at a 2013 celebrity boxing event

After his win in April 2010, he released "Don't Believe" written and produced by Dieter Bohlen. It topped the German, Austrian and Swiss charts. It was also a hit in the Netherlands. The follow-up was "Sweat" a cover of Inner Circle's "Sweat (A La La La La Long)" also featuring season 4 winner Mark Medlock. Both were from his debut album New Life that was released on 11 June 2010. A planned tour was cancelled due to low demand. In February 2011, Marashi opened a dance school and established a recording studio both in Hamburg.

On 24 June 2011, he released a second album Change Up with "Beautiful World" as a single, both with no success. He later released "Eine Nacht", his own composition. In 2012, he also founded his own label M8. In 2013, he was also involved in Promiboxen (celebrity boxing) with an initial fight against Daniel Aminati.

== Discography ==
=== Albums ===
List of albums, with selected chart positions
Title	Album details	Peak chart positions		
Title	Album details	GER	AUT	SWI
New Life	Released: 11 June 2010; Label: Columbia, Sony Music; Formats: CD, digital download	5	3	9
Change Up	Released: 24 June 2011; Label: Seven Days, Sony Music; Formats: CD, digital download	—	—	—
Entfesselt und frei	Released: 31 October 2014; Label: Nex; Formats: CD, digital download	—	—	—

=== Singles ===
List of singles, with selected chart positions and parent album
Title	Year	Peak chart positions							Album
Title	Year	GER	AUT	SWI	LIT	LUX	NL	EUR	Album
"Don't Believe"	2010	1	1	1	4	6	64	2	New Life
"Sweat" (feat. Mark Medlock)	2010	2	7	16	33	24	—	16	New Life
"Beautiful World"	2011	85	—	—	—	—	—	—	Change Up
"Eine Nacht"	2011	—	—	—	—	—	—	—	—

Preceded by Daniel Schuhmacher	Deutschland sucht den Superstar; Winner; Season 7 (2010)	Succeeded by Pietro Lombardi
