= Bad to the Bone (novel) =

2010 novel by Jeri Smith-Ready

- First edition (publ. Gallery Books)
- Author: Jeri Smith-Ready
- Language: English
- Publication date: 2010

Bad to the Bone is a 2010 novel by Jeri Smith-Ready. It is an espionage-farce sequel to 2008's Wicked Game. The book received a starred review from Publishers Weekly.
