= Thomas Karaoglan =

Thomas Karaoğlan
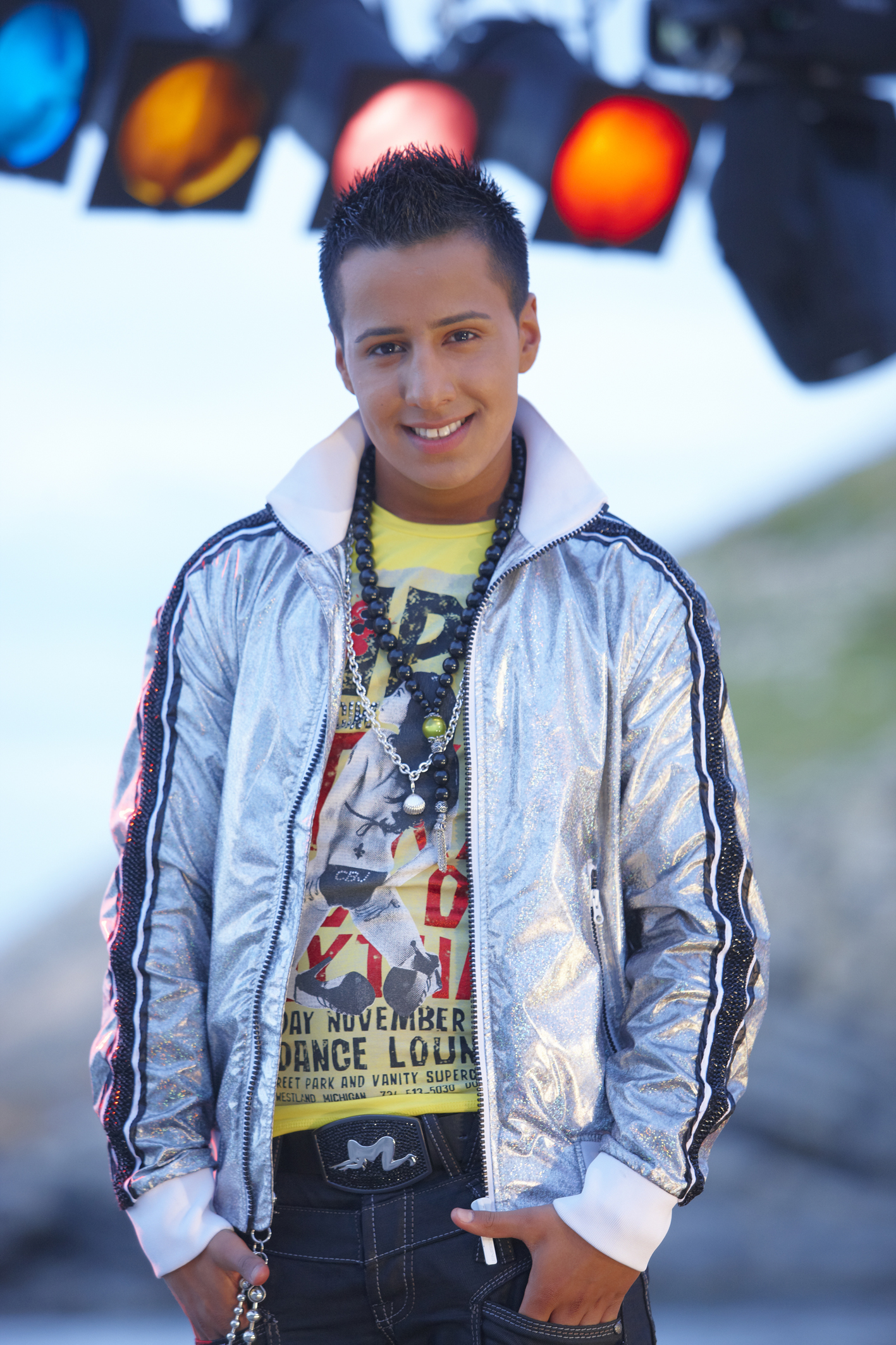

Background information
- Also known as: Der Checker
- Born: 20 March 1993 (age 33)
- Origin: Duisburg, Germany
- Genres: Pop
- Occupation: Singer
- Years active: 2010–present
- Label: Ariola

Thomas Karaoglan (born 20 March 1993 in Duisburg) known professionally as Der Checker is a German singer from the label Ariola.

== Biography ==
Karaoglan is of Armenian descent.

He became popular from participating in the German casting show Deutschland sucht den Superstar, where he reached fifth place.

In July 2010, Karaoglan published his first single "Checker, der Vollstrecker". 2011 Karaoglan published his second single called "Diskoking". In addition to this, Karaoglan and his dance partner Sarah Latton took part at the German Dance-Show Let's Dance where they reached 3rd place. Karaoglan stated that he "make crap music" and started to design jewelry with Harald Glööckler. Karaoglan was charged with two counts of sexually abusing a 12-year-old boy in Münster, North Rhine-Westphalia. Karaoglan pleaded not guilty to the charges. On 7 March 2013 the charges were downgraded to insult on a sexual basis and Karagolan was ordered to pay the boy €5000 after Karaoglan admitted kissing him on the cheek.

== Discography ==
Year	Title	Peak chart position			Album									
Year	Title	GER	AUT	SWI	Album									
2010	Checker, der Vollstrecker	18	23	-	-	Year	Title	Peak chart position	2011	Discoking	-	-	-	-
