= Anything but Love (Daniel Schuhmacher song) =

Single by Daniel Schuhmacher

from the album The Album
- Released: 15 May 2009
- Length: 3:31
- Label: 19; 313; Columbia; Sony
- Songwriter: Dieter Bohlen
- Producer: Dreamfactory

Daniel Schuhmacher singles chronology
"Anything but Love" (2009)	"Honestly" (2009)

"Anything but Love" is a song by German recording artist Daniel Schuhmacher, the winner of the sixth season of the television competition Deutschland sucht den Superstar. Written and produced by DSDS judge Dieter Bohlen, it was released as both his coronation song and debut single. Upon its release, it debuted at number-one on the Austrian, German and Swiss Singles Charts and became one of the highest-selling singles of the year. The song was later included on his debut album, The Album (2009).

== Chart performance ==
In Germany, "Anything but Love" debuted at number one on the German Singles Chart, achieving the highest first-week sales of any single released in 2009, The song was eventually certified gold by the Bundesverband Musikindustrie (BVMI), finishing as the country’s 19th best-selling single of the year with total sales of 270,000 copies. The song also reached number one in both Austria and Switzerland, making Schuhmacher the fourth Deutschland sucht den Superstar winner to top the charts in all three countries after Alexander Klaws, Tobias Regner, and Mark Medlock.

== Music video ==
A music video for "Anything but Love" was directed by Nikolaj Georgiew and filmed on Mallorca, the largest of Spain's Balearic Islands, in the week of 12 May 2009. Shot within 18 hours, the video was filmed near Cala Tuent and at the Gorg Blau reservoir, located within Serra de Tramuntana, the island's highest mountain range in the north. Schuhmacher's manager, Volker Neumüller, described the clip as featuring "vast open landscapes and rugged cliffs."

== Trrack listings ==
All tracks written and produced by Dieter Bohlen.

CD single
No.	Title	Length
1.	"Anything but Love" (single version)	3:30
2.	"Anything but Love" (orchester version)	3:35
3.	"Anything but Love" (instrumental)	3:28

== Charts ==
=== Weekly charts ===
Weekly chart performance for "Anything but Love"
Chart (2009)	Peak position
Austria (Ö3 Austria Top 40)	1
Germany (GfK)	1
Switzerland (Schweizer Hitparade)	1

=== Year-end charts ===
Year-end chart performance for "Anything but Love"
Chart (2009)	Position
Austria (Ö3 Austria Top 40)	36
Germany (GfK)	19
Switzerland (Schweizer Hitparade)	72

== Certifications ==
Certifications for "Anything but Love"
Region	Certification	Certified units/sales
Germany (BVMI)	Gold	150,000^{^}
^{*} Sales figures based on certification alone.^{^} Shipments figures based on certification alone.
