= Sweat (A La La La La Long) =

1992 single by Inner Circle

Single by Inner Circle

from the album Bad to the Bone
- Released: 10 July 1992
- Genre: Reggae fusion
- Length: 3:46
- Label: Warner Bros.; WEA
- Songwriters: Ian Lewis; Roger Lewis
- Producers: Ian Lewis; Roger Lewis; Touter Harvey

Inner Circle singles chronology
"Bad Boys" (1992)	"Sweat (A La La La La Long)" (1992)	"Games People Play" (1994)

Music video
- "Sweat (A La La La La Long)" on YouTube

"Sweat (A La La La La Long)" is a song by Jamaican reggae fusion band Inner Circle, released in July 1992 by Warner Bros. Records as the lead single from their twelfth album, Bad to the Bone (1992). It was written by the band's Ian and Roger Lewis, and features lead vocals by Calton Coffie. The song was produced by Ian and Roger Lewis, and another band member, Touter Harvey. It received favorable reviews from music critics, who praised its sing-along chorus. "Sweat" became a number-one hit in Belgium, Germany, Israel, the Netherlands, New Zealand, Portugal, Switzerland, and Zimbabwe. In the United States, it reached numbers 16 and 12 on the Billboard Hot 100 and Cash Box Top 100, respectively. The accompanying music video, depicting the group on the beach, was directed by Mathias Julien. Australian music channel Max included "Sweat (A La La La La Long)" in their list "1000 Greatest Songs of All Time" in 2017.

== Critical reception ==
Upon the release of the single, Larry Flick from Billboard magazine wrote that it "clips along at a fun and swaying pace. Topping on the cake is a sing-along refrain and chorus that will be the soundtrack to a bright summer day." Troy J. Augusto from Cash Box stated, "Actually, this incredibly catchy and brisk pop/ragga-tune will rule the summer airwaves as the band sweats all the way to the bank." Dave Sholin from the Gavin Report named it a "winner", adding, "one listen—slam dunk!" Another Gavin Report editor, Rod Edwards, wrote that "complete with a "sing-along" chorus, the reggae/dancehall appeal of this song should continue their success in the U.S."

In his weekly UK chart commentary, James Masterton said the song "is certainly a cod-reggae classic to rank alongside 'Girly Girly' and 'Real Fashion Reggae Style' which were both Top 10 hits in the mid-80s." James Hamilton from Music Week's RM Dance Update named it an "appealing but old fashioned pop reggae swayer" in his weekly dance column. Malaysian newspaper New Straits Times constated that "their pop-reggae may not be all that provocative or tough-edged, but it's supple and eminently hummable." Andrew Love from Ocala Star-Banner named the song one of the "greats" on their Bad Boys album. Mark Sutherland from Smash Hits declared it as "a bounce-along beach party of a choon with a "la la la" chorus". The song was ranked number 94 on the Triple J Hottest 100, 1993.

== Chart performance ==
"Sweat (A La La La La Long)" was a top-10 hit in Austria, Denmark, Finland, Greece, Ireland, Norway, Sweden and the United Kingdom, as well as on the Eurochart Hot 100, where the single peaked at number two. In the UK, it reached number three on the UK Singles Chart, on 16 May 1993, and at number six on the UK Dance Singles Chart. It is the group's highest-charting song in the UK, and it topped the charts of Switzerland and Germany for six and 12 weeks, respectively. It also reached number one in Belgium, the Netherlands, and Portugal. Outside Europe, "Sweat" was a hit in Israel and Zimbabwe, where it peaked at number one; Australia, reaching number two; and New Zealand, where it reached number one. In the United States, the song peaked at numbers 16 and 12 on the Billboard Hot 100 and Cash Box Top 100, respectively. In Canada, it reached number 38 on the RPM 100 Hit Tracks chart. "Sweat" earned a gold record in Austria, the Netherlands, the UK and the US. In Germany, it received a platinum record.

== Music video ==
A music video was produced to promote the single, directed by Mathias Jullien. In the video, the band performs the song on the beach among bathers. They are often seen in front of female dancers and a colorful backdrop in green, red and yellow. Other times, the band performs on a stage, in front of a large crowd. Occasionally the footage is in black and white. The video was later made available on YouTube in 2009, and had generated more than 162 million views as of May 2025. Julien would also be directing the video for the group's 1994 hit single "Games People Play".

== Track listings ==
- 7-inch single
1. "Sweat" (original version) — 3:46
2. "Bad Boys" (original mix) — 3:50
- 12-inch maxi, Europe
1. "Sweat" (swemix remix) — 5:35
2. "Sweat" (sweatbox construction) — 7:51
3. "Sweat" (circle zone dub mix) — 5:09
- 12-inch maxi, US
1. "Sweat" (Don T's dancehall version) — 3:54
2. "Sweat" (JJ's glamarama remix) — 5:27
3. "Sweat" (Don T's dub version) — 3:53
4. "Sweat" (Dave Morales def mix) — 4:53
5. "Sweat" (Dave's def raggamuffin dub) — 4:07
6. "Sweat" (original version) — 3:46
- CD single
1. "Sweat" (original version) — 3:46
2. "Sweat" (sweatbox construction) — 7:51
3. "Sweat" (circle zone dub mix) — 5:09
4. "Bad Boys" (original mix) — 3:50
- CD maxi
1. "Sweat" (original version) — 3:46
2. "Sweat" (sweatbox construction) — 7:56
3. "Sweat" (circle zone dub mix) — 5:14
4. "Bad Boys" (original mix) — 3:51
- CD maxi - Remixes
1. "Sweat" (swemix edit) — 4:20
2. "Sweat" (JJ's glamarama remix) — 5:27
3. "Sweat" (original version) — 3:46
4. "Sweat" (JJ's ragga zone dub) — 4:16
5. "Sweat" (DJ beats) — 2:30
- Cassette
1. "Sweat" (original version) — 3:46
2. "Bad Boys" (original mix) — 3:50
3. "Sweat" (original version) — 3:46
4. "Bad Boys" (original mix) — 3:50

== Charts ==
=== Weekly charts ===
Chart (1992–1993)	Peak position
Australia (ARIA)	2
Austria (Ö3 Austria Top 40)	2
Belgium (Ultratop 50 Flanders)	1
Canada Top Singles (RPM)	38
Denmark (IFPI)	2
Europe (Eurochart Hot 100)	2
Finland (Suomen virallinen lista)	5
France (SNEP)	12
Germany (GfK)	1
Greece (Pop + Rock)	9
Ireland (IRMA)	3
Israel (Israeli Singles Chart)	1
Italy (Musica e Dischi)	24
Netherlands (Dutch Top 40)	1
Netherlands (Single Top 100)	1
New Zealand (Recorded Music NZ)	1
Norway (VG-lista)	8
Portugal (AFP)	1
Quebec (ADISQ)	3
Sweden (Sverigetopplistan)	2
Switzerland (Schweizer Hitparade)	1
UK Singles (Official Charts)	3
UK Airplay (Music Week)	18
UK Dance (Music Week)	6
Uruguay (UPI)	10
US Billboard Hot 100	16
US Hot R&B/Hip-Hop Songs (Billboard)	73
US Pop Airplay (Billboard)	8
US Rhythmic Airplay (Billboard)	22
US Cash Box Top 100	12
Zimbabwe (ZIMA)	1

Chart (2013)	Peak position
Slovenia (SloTop50)	36

Chart (2016)	Peak position
Poland Airplay (ZPAV)	68

=== Year-end charts ===
Chart (1992)	Position
Austria (Ö3 Austria Top 40)	22
Belgium (Ultratop)	19
Germany (Media Control)	4
Netherlands (Dutch Top 40)	4
Netherlands (Single Top 100)	7
Switzerland (Schweizer Hitparade)	17

Chart (1993)	Position
Australia (ARIA)	4
Europe (Eurochart Hot 100)	43
Germany (Media Control)	93
New Zealand (RIANZ)	9
Sweden (Topplistan)	2
UK Singles (OCC)	19
US Billboard Hot 100	77

=== Decade-end charts ===
Chart (1990–1999)	Rank
Netherlands (Dutch Top 40)	47

== Certifications ==
Certifications for "Sweat (A La La La La Long)"
Region	Certification	Certified units/sales
Australia (ARIA)	2× Platinum	140,000^{^}
Austria (IFPI Austria)	Gold	25,000^{*}
Germany (BVMI)	Platinum	500,000^{^}
Netherlands (NVPI)	Gold	50,000^{^}
New Zealand (RMNZ)	3× Platinum	90,000^{‡}
Spain (Promusicae)	Gold	30,000^{‡}
United Kingdom (BPI)	Gold	400,000^{‡}
United States (RIAA)	Gold	500,000^{‡}
^{*} Sales figures based on certification alone.^{^} Shipments figures based on certification alone.^{‡} Sales+streaming figures based on certification alone.

== Mehrzad Marashi and Mark Medlock version ==
"Sweat (A La La La La Long)"

Single by Mehrzad Marashi and Mark Medlock

from the album New Life
- Released: 21 May 2010
- Length: 3:50
- Songwriters: Ian Lewis; Roger Lewis
- Producer: Dieter Bohlen

Mehrzad Marashi singles chronology
"Don't Believe" (2010)	"Sweat (A La La La La Long)" (2010)	"Beautiful World" (2011)

In 2010, German singers Mehrzad Marashi and Mark Medlock (both winners of Deutschland sucht den Superstar) covered the song as a duet. It was produced by Dieter Bohlen and was successful in Austria, Germany and Switzerland, peaking at numbers 7, 2 and 16, respectively.

=== Track listings ===
CD Maxi single
No.	Title	Writer(s)	Producer(s)	Length
1.	"Sweat (A La La La La Long)"	Ian Lewis	Dieter Bohlen; Jeo^{[a]}	3:50
2.	"Here in My Heart" (performed by Mark Medlock)	Bohlen	Bohlen; Jeo^{[a]}	3:10
3.	"Disappear" (performed by Mehrzad Marashi)	Bohlen	Bohlen; Jeo^{[a]}	3:40

Notes

- ^{^[a]} denotes co-producer(s)

=== Charts ===
==== Weekly charts ====
Weekly chart performance for "Sweat (A La La La La Long)"
Chart (2010)	Peak position
Austria (Ö3 Austria Top 40)	7
Germany (GfK)	2
Switzerland (Schweizer Hitparade)	16

==== Year-end charts ====
Weekly chart performance for "Sweat (A La La La La Long)"
Chart (2010)	Position
Germany (GfK)	83

== Other cover versions ==
- John Gibbons covered the song in 2018. The song charted at No. 51 on the Irish Singles Chart.
