= Games People Play (Joe South song) =

1968 single by Joe South

Single by Joe South

from the album Introspect
- B-side: "Mirror of Your Mind"
- Released: August 1968
- Genre: Folk rock; country rock; psychedelic rock
- Length: 3:34
- Label: Capitol
- Songwriter: Joe South
- Producer: Joe South

Joe South singles chronology
"Birds of a Feather" (1968)	"Games People Play" (1968)	"Don't It Make You Want to Go Home" (1969)

Official audio
- "Games People Play" (Remastered 2002) on YouTube

"Games People Play" is a song written, composed, and performed by American singer-songwriter Joe South, released in August 1968. It entered the US Billboard Hot 100 in January 1969 and won the 1970 Grammy Awards for both Best Contemporary Song and the Song of the Year. In 1994, Jamaican reggae band Inner Circle had a very successful European hit with their cover version of the song.

== Release ==
"Games People Play" is a protest song whose lyrics speak against various forms of hatred, hypocrisy, inhumanity, intolerance, and irresponsibility, in both interpersonal and social interactions between people. Billboard favorably reviewed the song some three months after its release and eight weeks before it finally reached the Hot 100.

The song was released on South's debut album Introspect and as a single, reaching No. 12 on the Hot 100. It was also a No. 6 hit in the UK in 1969, No. 4 in Ireland, and won the Grammy Award for Best Contemporary Song and the Grammy Award for Song of the Year.

The distinctive guitar in the opening is played on a Danelectro electric sitar, which can be seen in a video recorded to support South's album Introspect. Concurrent with South's version of the song on the pop chart, Freddy Weller, guitarist for Paul Revere and the Raiders, released a country version of the song in 1969 as his debut single; this rendition spent two weeks at No. 2 on the Country Chart.

== Charts ==
=== Weekly charts ===
Weekly chart performance for Joe South version
Chart (1968–1969)	Peak position
Austria (Ö3 Austria Top 40)	6
Belgium (Ultratop 50 Flanders)	16
Canada Top Singles (RPM)	7
Ireland (IRMA)	4
Netherlands (Dutch Top 40)	11
Netherlands (Single Top 100)	8
Norway (VG-lista)	5
South Africa (Springbok)	1
UK Singles (Official Charts)	6
US Billboard Hot 100	12
US Cash Box Top 100	10
West Germany (Media Control Charts)	11

=== Year-end charts ===
1969 chart performance for Joe South version
Chart (1969)	Rank
Canada Top Singles (RPM)	85
South Africa (Springbok)	15
US Billboard Hot 100	79
US Cash Box Top 100	93

== Inner Circle version ==
"Games People Play"

Single by Inner Circle

from the album Reggae Dancer
- Released: 1994
- Studio: Audiovision, Miami
- Genre: Reggae
- Length: 3:26
- Label: WEA
- Songwriter: Joe South
- Producers: Touter Harvey; Ian Lewis

Inner Circle singles chronology
"Sweat (A La La La La Long)" (1992)	"Games People Play" (1994)	"Summer Jammin'" (1994)

Music video
- "Games People Play" on YouTube

"Games People Play" was covered by Jamaican reggae band Inner Circle on their 1994 album, Reggae Dancer, released by WEA. It was chosen as a single because it had grown into a crowd pleaser at the band's live shows. In the US, it peaked at number 84 on the Billboard Hot 100 and number 51 on the Cash Box Top 100. It was very successful across Europe, reaching the top 10 in several countries, like Iceland, the Netherlands, Sweden and Switzerland. The single reached its best chart position in Finland, where it peaked at number two. Outside Europe, it also hit number four in New Zealand.

=== Critical reception ===
Larry Flick from Billboard magazine wrote:

"Reggae outfit is once again ready for top 40 picking with this rendition of Joe South's 1969 hit. Although band has many of its own solid songs to offer, there is no denying that reggae clicks with pop programmers faster when wrapped around a familiar tune. Once attitudes change in the mainstream, then maybe we'll get more original singles. In the meantime, enjoy Inner Circle's deft musicianship and charming vocals."

Alan Jones from Music Week deemed it "another reggae cover of little significance but great potential", adding that this version "is bright, bouncy and competent. It's already a huge hit in Europe, and an MTV staple, so UK success seems simply a matter of time." Mark Sutherland from Smash Hits gave the song a score of four out of five, saying, "If everything in Life was as reliable as Inner Circle. Every summer they seem to come up with the perfect smiley reggae record." He described it as "a bounce-along beach party of a choon with a, erm, "NA NA NA" chorus. Unbeatable as a soundtrack for beach volleyball – and as big a hit as their lard-tub guitarist."

=== Music video ===
The accompanying music video for "Games People Play" was directed by Mathias Julien and filmed in Fiji, featuring the band performing on the beach and on a boat. Julien had previously directed the video for the band's 1992 hit, "Sweat (A La La La La Long)", which is very similar. In Europe, "Games People Play" received "break out" rotation on MTV Europe in August 1994. Same month, it was B-listed on German music television channel VIVA.

=== Track listing ===
- 12-inch, US (1994)

A1. "Games People Play" (Radio Mix) – 5:40
A2. "Games People Play" (Dancehall Version) – 3:50
A3. "Games People Play" (Original Mix) – 3:55
B1. "Games People Play" (Extended Mix) – 5:39
B2. "Games People Play" (Legalized Dub) – 5:06

- 12-inch vinyl, Europe (1994)

A1. "Games People Play" (Extended Version) – 5:40
A2. "Games People Play" (Miami Mix) – 3:55
B1. "Games People Play" (Big Game Dub) – 5:07
B2. "Games People Play" (Radio Edit) – 3:26

- CD single, Australia (1994)
1. "Games People Play" (Radio Edit) – 3:26
2. "Games People Play" (Miami Mix) – 3:55
3. "Games People Play" (Big Game Dub) – 5:07
4. "Games People Play" (Extended Version) – 5:40
- CD single, Europe (1994)
1. "Games People Play" (Radio Edit) – 3:26
2. "Games People Play" (Miami Mix) – 3:55
- CD maxi, Europe (1994)
1. "Games People Play" (Radio Edit) – 3:26
2. "Games People Play" (Miami Mix) – 3:55
3. "Games People Play" (Big Game Dub) – 5:07
4. "Games People Play" (Extended Version) – 5:40
- Cassette single, Europe (1994)

A1. "Games People Play" (Radio Edit) – 3:26
A2. "Games People Play" (Miami Mix) – 3:55
B1. "Games People Play" (Radio Edit) – 3:26
B2. "Games People Play" (Miami Mix) – 3:55

- Cassette single, US (1994)

A1. "Games People Play" (Radio Mix)
A2. "Games People Play" (Dancehall Version)
B1. "Games People Play" (Radio Mix)
B2. "Games People Play" (Dancehall Version)

=== Charts ===
==== Weekly charts ====
Weekly chart performance for Inner Circle cover
Chart (1994)	Peak position
Australia (ARIA)	97
Austria (Ö3 Austria Top 40)	11
Belgium (Ultratop 50 Flanders)	12
Colombia (UPI)	2
Denmark (IFPI)	11
Europe (Eurochart Hot 100)	21
Europe (European AC Radio)	4
Europe (European Hit Radio)	4
Finland (Suomen virallinen singlelista)	2
Germany (GfK)	27
Iceland (Íslenski Listinn Topp 40)	8
Netherlands (Dutch Top 40)	8
Netherlands (Single Top 100)	8
New Zealand (Recorded Music NZ)	4
Quebec (ADISQ)	5
Scotland (OCC)	78
Sweden (Sverigetopplistan)	7
Switzerland (Schweizer Hitparade)	7
UK Singles (Official Charts)	67
UK Dance (OCC)	31
UK Airplay (Music Week)	33
UK Dance (Music Week)	31
US Billboard Hot 100	84
US Cash Box Top 100	51

==== Year-end charts ====
1994 year-end chart performance for Inner Circle cover
Chart (1994)	Rank
Europe Adult Contemporary (Music & Media)	16
Europe Border Breakers (Music & Media)	5
European Hit Radio (Music & Media)	24
Germany (Media Control)	95
Iceland (Íslenski Listinn Topp 40)	89
Netherlands (Dutch Top 40)	63
Netherlands (Single Top 100)	77
New Zealand (RIANZ)	28
Sweden (Topplistan)	38
Switzerland (Schweizer Hitparade)	48

=== Certifications ===
Certifications for "Games People Play"
Region	Certification	Certified units/sales
New Zealand (RMNZ)	Gold	15,000^{‡}
^{‡} Sales+streaming figures based on certification alone.

== Other cover versions ==
"Games People Play" has been covered by at least 194 artists. King Curtis won a Grammy for his version in 1970 for Best R&B Instrumental.

== Popular culture ==
- The song was referenced in the lyrics to the Beach Boys' song "Games Two Can Play".
