= Bad to the Bone (Inner Circle album) =

1992 studio album by Inner Circle

Studio album by Inner Circle
- Released: 1 September 1992
- Genre: Reggae; reggae fusion
- Length: 1:00:49 (U.S. version); 1:14:23 (International version)
- Label: RAS (U.S. version); WEA (international version)
- Producer: Ian Lewis; Touter Harvey; Roger Lewis

Inner Circle chronology
Black Roses (1990)	Bad to the Bone (1992)	Reggae Dancer (1994)

Singles from Bad to the Bone (international version)
- 1. "Sweat (A La La La La Long)" Released: 10 July 1992; 2. "Rock with You" Released: 1992; 3. "Bad Boys" Released: 29 June 1993

Professional ratings
Review scores
Source	Rating
Select	1/5 medals

Bad to the Bone is the twelfth studio album by Jamaican reggae band Inner Circle. Two versions of the album (U.S. and international) were released in 1992 through RAS Records and WEA respectively, and a U.S. reissue titled Bad Boys was released in 1993 through Big Beat Records. Bad to the Bone's international version and Bad Boys both contain the singles "Sweat (A La La La La Long)", "Rock with You", and "Bad Boys". The U.S. reissue won the Grammy Award for Best Reggae Album in 1994 and is the band's most commercially successful album, having been certified platinum by the RIAA for one million units shipped.

== Track listing ==
The tracks "Make U Sweat", "Shock Out (Hawaiian Style)" and "Bone Mix Ragga Style" (a ragga remix of "Bad to the Bone") appear exclusively on the U.S. version of Bad to the Bone. The international version contains "Bad Boys" and the radio mix of "Make U Sweat", titled "Sweat (A La La La La Long)".

The track "Stuck in the Middle" appears exclusively on the international version of Bad to the Bone. The international version also contains different versions of "Rock with You" and "Wrapped Up in Your Love" than those that appear on Bad Boys.

U.S. version
No.	Title	Length
1.	"Make U Sweat"	5:23
2.	"Party Party (Serious Times)"	4:38
3.	"Slow It Down (Take It Easy)"	4:04
4.	"Looking for a Better Way"	4:08
5.	"Shock Out (Hawaiian Style)"	3:49
6.	"Bad to the Bone"	4:50
7.	"Sunglasses at Nite"	3:44
8.	"Tear Down These Walls"	4:33
9.	"Long Time (Selassie A Warn Yu)"	3:31
10.	"Down by the River"	4:19
11.	"Bone Mix Ragga Style"	4:42
12.	"Hold On to the Ridim"	4:58
13.	"Why Them A Gwan So"	4:24
14.	"Shock Out (Jamaican Style)"	3:51
Total length:		1:00:49

International version
No.	Title	Length
1.	"Sweat (A La La La La Long)"	3:46
2.	"Shock Out (Jamaican Style)"	3:43
3.	"Bad to the Bone"	4:49
4.	"Rock with You"	4:24
5.	"Long Time (Selassie A Warn Yu)"	3:29
6.	"Hey Love"	4:22
7.	"Slow It Down"	4:02
8.	"Living It Up"	3:54
9.	"Stuck in the Middle"	4:11
10.	"Looking for a Better Way"	4:06
11.	"Wrapped Up in Your Love"	3:38
12.	"Bad Boys"	3:49
13.	"Party Party"	4:37
14.	"Sunglasses at Nite"	3:41
15.	"Tear Down These Walls"	4:26
16.	"Down by the River"	4:16
17.	"Hold On to the Ridim"	4:52
18.	"Why Them Gwan So"	4:18
Total length:		1:14:23

== Certifications ==
Certifications for Bad to the Bone
Region	Certification	Certified units/sales
Austria (IFPI Austria)	Gold	25,000^{*}
Canada (Music Canada)	Platinum	100,000^{^}
Germany (BVMI)	Gold	250,000^{^}
New Zealand (RMNZ)	Gold	7,500^{^}
Switzerland (IFPI Switzerland)	Platinum	50,000^{^}
^{*} Sales figures based on certification alone.^{^} Shipments figures based on certification alone.

== Bad Boys ==
Bad Boys

Studio album (reissue) by Inner Circle
- Released: 19 April 1993
- Genre: Reggae; reggae fusion
- Length: 57:27
- Label: Big Beat
- Producer: Ian Lewis; Touter Harvey; Roger Lewis

Inner Circle chronology
Black Roses (1990)	Bad Boys (1993)	Reggae Dancer (1994)

Bad Boys consists entirely of songs from the international version of Bad to the Bone, but it is the first U.S. release to contain the songs "Sweat (A La La La La Long)", "Rock with You", "Wrapped Up in Your Love", "Living It Up", and "Hey Love". It is also the only of the three versions to contain the tracks "Sweat (A La La La La Long) (Dancehall Mix)" and "Bad Boys (David Morales Mix)". Bad Boys contains remixed versions of "Rock with You", "Wrapped Up in Your Love", and "Bad to the Bone" that do not appear in either version of Bad to the Bone.

=== Track listing ===
No.	Title	Writer(s)	Producer(s)	Length
1.	"Sweat (A La La La La Long)"	Ian Lewis	Ian Lewis, Touter Harvey, Roger Lewis, Per Adebratt, Tommy Ekman	3:46
2.	"Bad Boys"	Inner Circle	I. Lewis, Harvey, R. Lewis	3:48
3.	"Rock with You"	I. Lewis	I. Lewis, Harvey, R. Lewis, Adebratt, Ekman	3:36
4.	"Wrapped Up in Your Love"	Harvey	I. Lewis, Harvey, R. Lewis, Adebratt, Ekman	3:43
5.	"Looking for a Better Way"	I. Lewis	I. Lewis, Harvey, R. Lewis	4:04
6.	"Sunglasses at Nite"	Inner Circle	I. Lewis, Harvey, R. Lewis	3:42
7.	"Living It Up"	I. Lewis	I. Lewis, Harvey, R. Lewis	3:54
8.	"Hey Love"	I. Lewis	I. Lewis, Harvey, R. Lewis	4:21
9.	"Bad to the Bone"	I. Lewis	I. Lewis, Harvey, R. Lewis, Adebratt, Ekman	3:14
10.	"Down by the River"	Neil Young	I. Lewis, Harvey, R. Lewis	4:16
11.	"Slow It Down"	Calton Coffie	I. Lewis, Harvey, R. Lewis	4:02
12.	"Sweat (A La La La La Long) (Dancehall Mix)"	I. Lewis	I. Lewis, Harvey, R. Lewis	5:28
13.	"Tear Down These Walls"	Inner Circle	I. Lewis, Harvey, R. Lewis	4:25
14.	"Bad Boys (David Morales Mix)"	Inner Circle	I. Lewis, Harvey, R. Lewis, David Morales	5:14
Total length:				57:27

== Certifications ==
Certifications for Bad Boys
Region	Certification	Certified units/sales
United States (RIAA)	Platinum	1,000,000^{^}
^{^} Shipments figures based on certification alone.
