= Bad Boys (Inner Circle song) =

1987 single by Inner Circle

- Swedish single picture sleeve, 1990

Single by Inner Circle

from the album One Way and Bad Boys/Bad to the Bone
- B-side: "Sweat (A La La La La Long)"
- Released: 1987
- Genre: Reggae
- Length: 3:52
- Label: Island
- Songwriter: Ian Lewis
- Producers: Ian Lewis, Touter Harvey, Roger Lewis

Inner Circle singles chronology
"Black and White" (1989)	"Bad Boys" (1987)	"Black Roses" (1991)

Audio sample
- file; help

"Bad Boys" is a song by the Jamaican reggae band Inner Circle, which was first released in 1987. It gained high popularity in the United States after its re-release in 1993, peaking at number eight on both the Billboard Hot 100 and Cash Box Top 100 charts, and number seven on the Billboard Top 40/Mainstream chart. It is the opening theme to the American documentary TV show Cops and the theme song of the 1995 American action comedy film Bad Boys, and is also featured in the film's sequels.

== History ==
The song was originally included on the album One Way, released in October 1987. It was released as a single in mid-1991 in Norway and Finland, where it peaked at number one. In 1992, it was included on the Bad to the Bone album, and the song was released again as a single in 1993, after the unexpected success of their previous international hit single "Sweat (A La La La La Long)". "Bad Boys" reached number 52 in the United Kingdom and number eight in the United States. In the latter territory, it was certified gold and sold 600,000 copies. The song was also released as the B-side on the band's 1992 single, "Sweat (A La La La La Long)".

== Charts ==
=== Weekly charts ===
Chart (1990–1991)	Peak position
Finland (Suomen virallinen lista)	1
Norway (VG-lista)	1
Sweden (Sverigetopplistan)	2

Chart (1993)	Peak position
Australia (ARIA)	25
Austria (Ö3 Austria Top 40)	21
Canada Top Singles (RPM)	19
Germany (GfK)	35
Iceland (Íslenski Listinn Topp 40)	18
Ireland (IRMA)	26
New Zealand (Recorded Music NZ)	5
UK Singles (Official Charts)	52
UK Dance (Music Week)	30
US Billboard Hot 100	8
US Hot R&B Singles (Billboard)	58
US Maxi-Singles Sales (Billboard)	15
US Top 40/Mainstream (Billboard)	7
US Top 40/Rhythm-Crossover (Billboard)	27
US Cash Box Top 100	8

=== Year-end charts ===
Chart (1990)	Rank
Sweden (Topplistan)	37

Chart (1991)	Rank
Sweden (Topplistan)	22

Chart (1993)	Rank
Australia (ARIA)	88
New Zealand (RIANZ)	15
US Billboard Hot 100	69

== Certifications ==
Region	Certification	Certified units/sales
New Zealand (RMNZ)	Gold	15,000^{‡}
United Kingdom (BPI)	Silver	200,000^{‡}
United States (RIAA)	Platinum	1,000,000^{‡}
^{‡} Sales+streaming figures based on certification alone.

== Use on Cops ==
"Bad Boys" was selected as the theme song for Cops because a field producer for the show happened to be a fan of Inner Circle. The song, which was very popular during the 1990s, is also used in the Will Smith and Martin Lawrence action/comedy film series Bad Boys, which was named after the song.

== See also ==
- List of number-one singles of 1991 (Finland)
- List of number-one songs in Norway
