= Daniel Schuhmacher =

German singer and songwriter

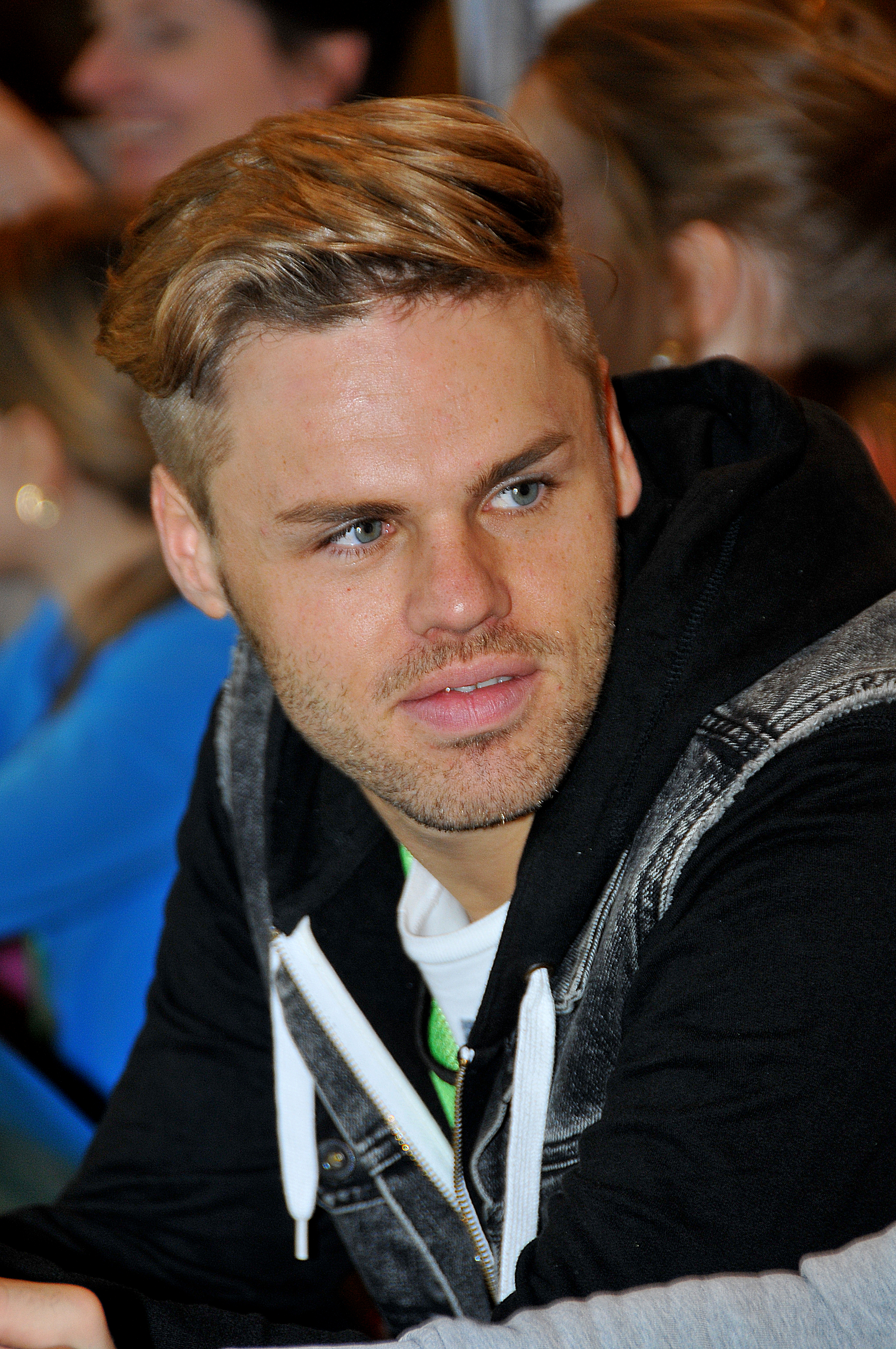
- Daniel Schuhmacher in 2014.

Background information
- Born: 19 April 1987 (age 39); Pfullendorf, West Germany
- Genres: Pop, dance pop
- Occupations: Singer, songwriter
- Instrument: Vocals
- Years active: 2009–present
- Label: 313music
- Website: www.daniel-schuhmacher.tv

Daniel Schuhmacher (born 19 April 1987) is a German singer and songwriter. In 2009, he rose to fame after winning the sixth season of Deutschland sucht den Superstar, the German edition of Pop Idol. His debut album The Album was released later in the same year and topped the German and Austrian Albums Charts, going gold. It spawned the hit single "Anything but Love", his coronation song, which became a number-one hit Austria, Germany, and Switzerland and was also certified gold.

== Early life ==
Schuhmacher was born and raised in Pfullendorf, Baden-Württemberg. Schuhmacher's hobbies are tennis, music, skating, meeting friends, movies, and films. His nicknames are Kell, Kelly, and Schumi. He has 4 tattoos which are located on the hip, neck and both wrists.

== Career ==
=== 2008–09: Deutschland sucht den Superstar ===
DSDS season 6 performances and results
Theme (date)	Song	Original Artist	Place/Percentage
The Top 15 — Now or Never (28 February 2009)	Broken Strings	James Morrison	10.63% (4/15)
Top 10 — Greatest Hits (7 March 2009)	If You Don't Know Me by Now	Simply Red	13.97% (3/10)
Top 9 — Geschlechtertausch (14 March 2009)	Irgendwas bleibt	Silbermond	13.11% (3/9)
Top 8 — Party-Hits (21 March 2009)	Sweet Dreams (Are Made of This)	Eurythmics	18.39% (1/8)
Top 7 — Sexy Hits (4 April 2009)	Sexual Healing	Marvin Gaye	21.29% (1/7)
Top 6 — Aktuelle Hits & I love you (11 April 2009)	You Give Me Something	James Morrison	15.88% (4/6)
Top 6 — Aktuelle Hits & I love you (11 April 2009)	Allein Allein	Polarkreis 18	15.88% (4/6)
Top 5 — Sonne und Regen (18 April 2009)	Here Comes the Rain Again	Eurythmics	32.68% (1/5)
Top 5 — Sonne und Regen (18 April 2009)	Ain't No Sunshine	Bill Withers	32.68% (1/5)
Top 4 — Moviesongs & Unplugged (25 April 2009)	Take My Breath Away	Berlin	26.59% (2/4)
Top 4 — Moviesongs & Unplugged (25 April 2009)	You Are So Beautiful	Joe Cocker	26.59% (2/4)
Top 3 — Uptempo, Power ballad & No.1 Hits (2 May 2009)	Rehab	Amy Winehouse	33.81% (2/3)
Top 3 — Uptempo, Power ballad & No.1 Hits (2 May 2009)	Get Here	Oleta Adams	33.81% (2/3)
Top 3 — Uptempo, Power ballad & No.1 Hits (2 May 2009)	Stand by Me	Ben E. King	33.81% (2/3)
Top 2 — Finale — Singer's choice, Highlight Song, Winner's Single (9 May 2009)	Soulmate	Natasha Bedingfield	50.47% (1/2)
Top 2 — Finale — Singer's choice, Highlight Song, Winner's Single (9 May 2009)	Ain't No Sunshine	Bill Withers	50.47% (1/2)
Top 2 — Finale — Singer's choice, Highlight Song, Winner's Single (9 May 2009)	Anything but Love	Daniel Schuhmacher	50.47% (1/2)

=== Post-DSDS ===
Schuhmacher's coronation song "Anything but Love" was released by Sony Music on 15 May 2009. Upon its release, it debuted at number-one on the Austrian, German and Swiss Singles Charts, scoring the highest first week single sales of the year in Germany. The single sold 270.000 copies in total and was eventually certified gold by the Bundesverband Musikindustrie (BVMI) and the International Federation of the Phonographic Industry of Austria (IFPI). It was later included on his debut album, The Album (2009), which was released in June 2009. Helmed by DSDS judge Dieter Bohlen's Dreamfactory, it debuted at number one on German Albums Chart and was eventually certified gold by the BVMI, selling 137.000 within the first nine months of its release. Critics praised Schuhmacher's vocal performance on the album, but dismissed Bohlen's production and lyrics ambitions. In September 2009, Bohlen and Schuhmacher ended their collaboration.

== Personal life ==
In May 2014, Schuhmacher came out as gay in an interview with IN.

== Discography ==
=== Studio albums ===
List of albums, with selected chart positions and certifications
Title	Album details	Peak chart positions			Certifications
Title	Album details	GER	AUT	SWI	Certifications
The Album	Released: 19 May 2009; Label: Sony Music; Formats: CD, digital download	1	1	4	AUT: Gold; GER: Gold
Nothing to Lose	Released: 17 September 2010; Label: 313 Music; Formats: CD, digital download	37	—	—	
Diversity	Released: 25 October 2013; Label: 313 Music; Formats: CD, digital download	90	—	—	

=== Singles ===
List of singles, with selected chart positions and parent album
Title	Year	Peak chart positions			Album
Title	Year	GER	AUT	SWI	Album
"Anything but Love"	2009	1	1	1	The Album
"Honestly"	2009	22	62	—	Nothing to Lose
"If It's Love"	2010	30	—	—	Nothing to Lose
"Feel"	2010	50	—	—	Nothing to Lose
"On a Wave"	2011	—	—	—	Diversity
"Rolling Stone"	2013	86	—	—	Diversity
"Gold"	2013	—	—	—	Diversity
"Electric Heart"	2013	—	—	—	
"—" denotes releases that did not chart or were not released.

== Awards ==
Year	Award	Category
2010	VIVA Comet 2010	Best Newcomer

Preceded by Thomas Godoj	Deutschland sucht den Superstar; Winner; Season 6 (2009)	Succeeded by Mehrzad Marashi
