= The Album (Daniel Schuhmacher album) =

Studio album by Daniel Schuhmacher
- Released: 19 June 2009
- Length: 49:58
- Language: English
- Label: 19; 313; Columbia; Sony
- Producer: Dieter Bohlen

Daniel Schuhmacher chronology
| The Album (2009) | Nothing to Lose (2010) |

Singles from The Album
- 1. "Anything But Love" Released: 15 May 2009

The Album is the debut album by German recording artist Daniel Schuhmacher, the winner of the sixth season of Deutschland Sucht Den Superstar, the German version of American Idol. It was released by Sony Music on 19 June 2009. Entirely produced by DSDS judge Dieter Bohlen's Dreamfactory, the album contains two cover versions which were already performed by Schuhmacher during the DSDS shows, including "Sweet Dreams (Are Made of This)" by Eurythmics and "Ain't No Sunshine" by Bill Withers, as well as his number-one hit and coronation song "Anything But Love."

== Critical reception ==
Professional ratings
Review scores
| Source | Rating |
|---|---|
| laut.de | 2/5 stars |

Danni Fromm from laut.de rated the album two out of five stars. She found the album to be sharply lacking in lyrical quality, describing the text as "miserable, poorly formulated textual nonsense" rather than meaningful "lyrics." Fromm criticized its heavy reliance on clichés, noting repetitive keywords such as "love", "please", and "lonely night," which it argues reveal a formulaic songwriting approach. She further concluded that the material was interchangeable and unoriginal, pointing the title The Album as evidence of its creative emptiness.

== Chart performance ==
The Album debuted at number one on German Albums Chart, making Schuhmacher the fifth DSDS winner to reach the top position. It was eventually certified gold by the Bundesverband Musikindustrie (BVMI), selling 137,000 within the first nine months of its release. In Austria, the album also reached number one on the Austrian Albums Chart, where it eventually achieved gold status for sales of over 10,000 units, while in Switzerland, it peaked at number four on the Swiss Albums Chart.

== Track listing ==
All tracks produced by Dreamfactory.

The Album track listing
| No. | Title | Writer(s) | Length |
|---|---|---|---|
| 1. | "Anything But Love" | Dieter Bohlen | 3:31 |
| 2. | "Take Me to the Clouds" | Bohlen | 3:43 |
| 3. | "Sweet Dreams" | Annie Lennox; David Stewart | 4:53 |
| 4. | "Please Stay Tonight" | Bohlen | 3:51 |
| 5. | "Emily" | Bohlen | 3:12 |
| 6. | "Cause It's Over" | Bohlen | 3:32 |
| 7. | "I Love Your Smile" | Bohlen | 3:53 |
| 8. | "Ain't No Sunshine" | Bill Withers | 2:04 |
| 9. | "Nothing's Gonna Change It" | Bohlen | 3:28 |
| 10. | "It's a Lonely Night" | Bohlen | 3:29 |
| 11. | "Why?" | Bohlen | 3:45 |
| 12. | "How Can I Be Sure?" | Bohlen | 3:26 |
| 13. | "Anything But Love" (duet with Sarah Kreuz) | Bohlen | 3:35 |
| Total length: | | | 49:58 |

== Charts ==
=== Weekly charts ===
Weekly chart performance for The Album
| Chart (2009) | Peak position |
|---|---|
| Austrian Albums (Ö3 Austria) | 1 |
| German Albums (Offizielle Top 100) | 1 |
| Swiss Albums (Schweizer Hitparade) | 4 |

=== Year-end charts ===
Year-end chart performance for The Album
| Chart (2009) | Position |
|---|---|
| German Albums (Offizielle Top 100) | 68 |

== Certifications ==
Certifications for The Album
| Region | Certification | Certified units/sales |
|---|---|---|
| Austria (IFPI Austria) | Gold | 10,000^{*} |
| Germany (BVMI) | Gold | 100,000^{^} |
^{*} Sales figures based on certification alone.^{^} Shipments figures based on certification alone.
