= Inner Circle (band) =

Jamaican reggae band

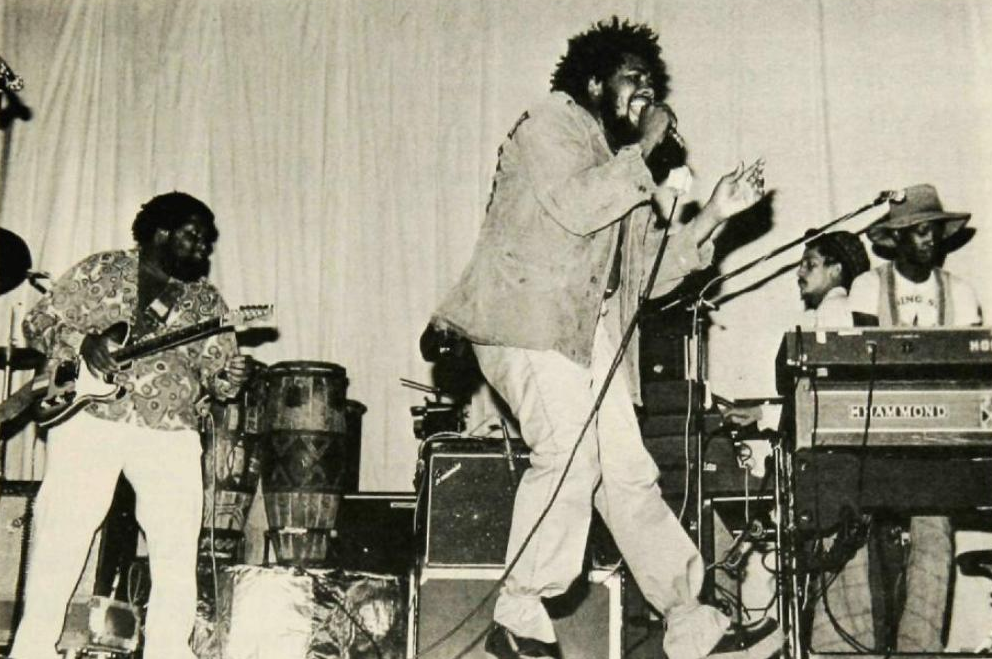
- Inner Circle in 1976

Background information
- Also known as: The Inner Circle Band; The Bad Boys of Reggae
- Origin: Kingston, Jamaica
- Genres: Reggae, reggae fusion
- Years active: 1968–1980, 1981–1982, 1986–present
- Labels: Trojan, Capitol, Island, RAS, Atlantic, Big Beat, VP, Shanachie, Soundbwoy Entertainment
- Members: Ian Lewis; Roger Lewis; Bernard "Touter" Harvey; Lancelot Hall; Trevor "Skatta" Bonnick; Andre Philips
- Past members: Michael "Ibo" Cooper; Stephen "Cat" Coore; William "Bunny Rugs" Clarke; William Stewart; Irvin "Carrot" Jarrett; Milton "Prilly" Hamilton; Charles Farquharson; Calvin McKenzie; Funky Brown; Jacob Miller; Ed Elizalde; Joe Ortiz; Lester Adderley; Norman Grant; Mark Castro; Rick Hunt; Anthony "Junior" Douglas; Calton Coffie; Dave Gonzales; Kris Bentley; Jr. Jazz; Michael Sterling

Audio sample
- Inner Circle – Bad Boys: file; help
- Website: badboysofreggae.com

Inner Circle, also known as The Inner Circle Band or The Bad Boys of Reggae, are a Jamaican reggae band formed in Kingston in 1968. The band first backed The Chosen Few in the early 1970s before joining with successful solo artist Jacob Miller and releasing a string of records. This era of the band ended with Miller's death in a car crash in 1980.

The group reformed in 1986. During this period, they released several international hit singles, including "Sweat (A La La La La Long)" and "Bad Boys", the latter of which later became the theme to the American television show COPS. The group continued to record and tour thereafter.

Brothers Ian and Roger Lewis have remained the group's consistent members, playing bass and guitar, respectively. Other long-term members include keyboardist Bernard "Touter" Harvey, a member since 1973, and drummer Lancelot Hall, who joined during their 1986 reformation. The band's lineup is completed by singer Trevor "Skatta" Bonnick and lead guitarist Andre Philips.

== Career ==
=== Early history (1968–1974) ===
Inner Circle was formed in Kingston, Jamaica, in 1968, by the brothers Ian Lewis and Roger Lewis with then 12-year-old Stephen "Cat" Coore and Michael Cooper. They appeared on record in 1970, backing The Chosen Few on the Derrick Harriott-produced single "Why Can't I Touch You", with the Inner Circle Band credited with the instrumental version on the B-side. This was one of several singles on which they backed the Chosen Few. In 1970 the band was expanded when they were joined by drummer William Stewart, percussionist Irvin "Carrot" Jarrett, and singer William "Bunny Rugs" Clarke. The band played on Eric Donaldson's hit single "Cherry Oh Baby" and recorded their own version as "Red Cherry".

Jarrett left the band in 1972, with singer Clarke leaving the following year when he moved to New York. Clarke's replacement was Milton "Prilly" Hamilton, but this line-up was short-lived as the band split in two with Coore, Cooper, and Hamilton leaving to form Third World in 1973. Coore and Cooper were then students of the University of the West Indies, studying for various degrees and were soon joined in Third World by fellow Inner Circle departees Clarke and Jarrett. Meanwhile, Inner Circle re-tooled the lineup by recruiting keyboard players Charles Farquharson and Bernard Harvey (aka "Touter"), as well as drummer Calvin McKenzie as a replacement for Stewart (who would also go on to play with Third World). The band played the hotel and club circuit in Kingston, playing a mixture of reggae, pop and soul hits, and released their first album, Dread Reggae Hits, in 1973 on Ian Lewis's Top Ranking label.

=== The Jacob Miller years ===
After recording with singer Funky Brown, they recruited Jacob Miller as a permanent vocalist (although he continued to record as a solo artist), and had a hit single with a version of The Stylistics' "You Make Me Feel Brand New". Some of Miller's work with the band was credited to Miller alone, including the "Tenement Yard" single. The band was signed by Capitol Records, who issued the albums Reggae Thing (1976) and Ready for the World (1977). They toured the United States with American guitarist, Ed Elizalde. In 1978 they moved on to Island Records who released the Everything Is Great album in 1978, which included the UK hit singles "Everything Is Great" and "Stop Breaking My Heart", and New Age Music the following year. The band was joined by New York session guitarist Joe Ortiz, dubbed 'Gitzy' by the band; who added the first touches of hard rock, jazz, and blues to the group and to reggae in general. Ortiz recorded at Compass Point Studios for the Everything Is Great album on Island Records, and later joined the group for their European tour in 1978–1980. He was also the lead guitarist on the title track "New Age Music" on the album of the same name. Lester Adderley joined the group for the New Age Music album on guitar. Also released in the late 1970s were two dub albums based on Miller's solo albums Killer Miller and Wanted but credited to Inner Circle. The band gained further exposure via their performance in the film Rockers, playing a hotel house band. At his peak in the 1970s, only Bob Marley was more popular in Jamaica than Miller, and as a live act, nobody equalled their popularity.

Miller's death in a car crash on 23 March 1980 led the band to split up, with the Lewis Brothers and Touter Harvey moving to Miami, where they opened a studio in a warehouse, later opening their own Circle House recording studio, and the band has been based in Miami since then. After Miller's death in 1980, the band had one more American tour, inviting Norman Grant from the Twinkle Brothers for vocals.

=== Reformation and US success ===
In 1981, with Bay Area lead guitarist, Mark Castro, they recorded the album Something So Good. Due to the loss of Jacob Miller, the members asked Mark Castro to help them find a new vocalist. Mark brought Rick Hunt to the band. "Something So Good" includes the memorable signature lead guitar solos that only Mark Castro can produce, especially When a Man Loves a Woman and World 2000."Something So Good" was released in 1982. They reformed in 1986 with the Lewis Brothers and Harvey joined by singer Calton Coffie and drummer Lancelot Hall, and this line-up released the Black Roses album (released in 1986 on RAS Records). The band's next album, One Way in 1987, included one of their biggest hits, "Bad Boys", which was re-recorded for their 1989 album Identified and became the theme music for the Fox TV series Cops that year. California guitarist Dave Gonzales, by Mark Castro's recommendation, joined the band for a tour in 1989. "Bad Boys" was reissued as a single in 1990 and charted in several countries in Europe, but it was its 1993 re-release in the United States that achieved the greatest success. The 1992 album Bad to the Bone was picked up by Atlantic Records and reissued as Bad Boys in 1993 to capitalize on the success of the single. It sold more than half a million copies in the United States and more than four million worldwide. The band received a Grammy Award in 1993 for 'Best Reggae Album by Duo or Group' for Bad Boys and the album also spawned the international hit single "Sweat (A La La La La Long)", which was a No. 3 hit in the UK Singles Chart and topped the chart in 10 countries, selling over a million copies in Europe, while "Bad Boys" peaked at No. 52. It was their second (and last) American hit, reaching No. 16 on the Billboard Hot 100. "Bad Boys" was used in the 1995 film of the same name starring Will Smith and Martin Lawrence and its sequels Bad Boys II and Bad Boys for Life, and a ringtone based on the song was on the Billboard Hot Ringtones Chart for over 110 weeks. They received a second Grammy nomination in 1994 for the album Reggae Dancer, which included a cover of Joe South's "Games People Play" which was released as a single.

Coffie left in the mid-1990s to pursue a solo career, and they were joined in 1994 by Kris Bentley who made his album debut on Da Bomb (1997), released on the band's own Soundbwoy Entertainment label. In 1999 they released the album Jamaika Me Crazy on their own Eureka label. The 2000 album Big Tings featured guest appearances from Mr Vegas, Beenie Man, Luciano, Anthony B, and Glen Washington. In 2008, Jr. Jazz took over as lead vocalist.

As well as running the Circle Sound studio, the band members also run the Circle Sound production company.

The band's 2009 album State of Da World featured contributions from an array of reggae stars including Luciano, Damian Marley, Stephen Marley, Junior Reid, Mutabaruka, Bushman, David Hinds of Steel Pulse, and members of Slightly Stoopid.

In 2012, the band launched the 'Saving The Reggae Music' campaign with the aim of promoting traditional reggae music over the increasingly US-influenced music coming out of Jamaica.

The band's 2012 album Dubets featured collaborations with Peetah Morgan, Ken Boothe, Marcia Griffiths, Glen Washington, Ali Campbell of UB40, Gramps Morgan, A.J. Brown, and Marty Dread. The group went on to record with several younger singers and deejays, including Damian Marley, I-Octane, Khago, and Chronixx, with whom they recorded an updated version of "Tenement Yard".

In 2019 it was announced that Ian and Roger Lewis, and Jacob Miller would receive the Order of Distinction from the Jamaican government.

== Members ==
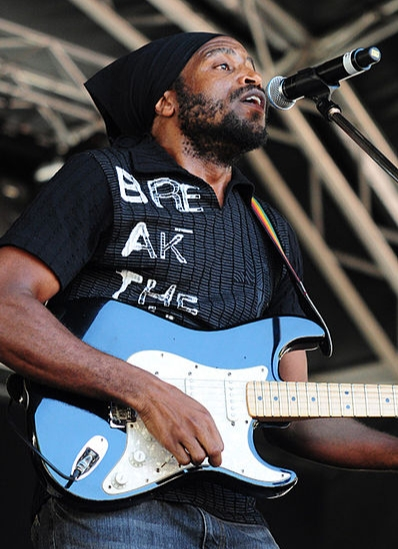
Inner Circle in Australia in 2009

Current members

- Ian Lewis (born 1 November 1953) – bass, vocals (1968–1980, 1981–1982, 1986–present)
- Roger Lewis (born 29 June 1951) – guitar, vocals (1968–1980, 1981–1982, 1986–present)
- Bernard "Touter" Harvey (born 25 October 1955) – keyboards, vocals (1973–1980, 1981–1982, 1986–present)
- Lancelot Hall (born 7 February 1960) – drums (1986–present)
- Trevor "Skatta" Bonnick – vocals (2013–present)
- Andre Phillips – guitar (2017–present)
- Benji Baez - guitar (2023 - present)

Former members

- Michael "Ibo" Cooper – keyboards (1968–1973; died 2023)
- Stephen "Cat" Coore – guitar (1968–1973; died 2026)
- William "Bunny Rugs" Clarke – vocals (1970–1973; died 2014)
- William Stewart – drums (1970–1973)
- Irvin "Carrot" Jarrett – percussion (1970–1972; died 2018)
- Milton "Prilly" Hamilton – vocals (1973)
- Charles Farquharson – keyboards (1973–1980, 1981–1982)
- Calvin McKenzie – drums (1973–1980, 1981–1982)
- Funky Brown – vocals (1973–1974)
- Jacob Miller – vocals (1974–1980; his death)
- Ed Elizalde – guitar (1977–1978)
- Joe Ortiz – guitar (1978–1980)
- Lester Adderley – guitar (1979–1980)
- Norman Grant – vocals (1980)
- Mark Castro – guitar (1981–1982)
- Rick Hunt – vocals (1981–1982)
- Anthony "Junior" Douglas – drums/background vocals (1981–1982)
- Calton Coffie – vocals (1986–1994; died 2023)
- Dave Gonzales – guitar (1989)
- Kris Bentley – vocals (1994–2008)
- Jr. Jazz – vocals, guitar (2008–2011)
- Michael Sterling – guitar, vocals (2013–2017)

== Discography ==
- Dread Reggay Hits (1973)
- Heavy Reggae (1974)
- Reggae Thing (1976)
- Barry Biggs and the Inner Circle (1977) (with Barry Biggs)
- Ready for the World (1977)
- Everything is Great (1979)
- New Age Music (1980)
- Something So Good (1982)
- One Way (1987)
- Identified (1989)
- Black Roses (1990)
- Bad to the Bone (1992)
- Reggae Dancer (1994)
- Da Bomb Speak My Language (1996)
- Jamaika Me Crazy (1998)
- State of Da World (2009)
