= List of number-one hits of 2007 (Germany) =

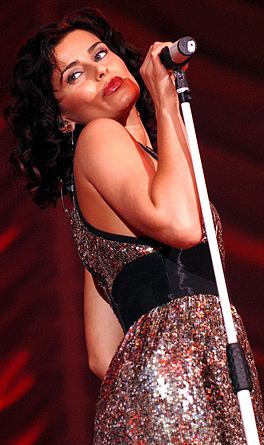
DJ Ötzi's "Ein Stern (...der deinen Namen trägt)" became the best-performing single of 2007, while Nelly Furtado's Loose became the best-performing album of the year.

This is a list of the German Media Control Top100 Singles Chart number-ones of 2007.

== Number-one hits by week ==
Key
†	Indicates best-performing single and album of 2007

Issue date	Song	Artist	Ref.	Album	Artist	Ref.
5 January	"All Good Things (Come to an End)"	Nelly Furtado		Temptation	Monrose	
12 January	"All Good Things (Come to an End)"	Nelly Furtado		Loose†	Nelly Furtado	
19 January	"All Good Things (Come to an End)"	Nelly Furtado		Loose†	Nelly Furtado	
26 January	"All Good Things (Come to an End)"	Nelly Furtado		Loose†	Nelly Furtado	
2 February	"All Good Things (Come to an End)"	Nelly Furtado		Loose†	Nelly Furtado	
9 February	"Übers Ende der Welt"	Tokio Hotel		Not Too Late	Norah Jones	
16 February	"Stück vom Himmel"	Herbert Grönemeyer		Not Too Late	Norah Jones	
23 February	"Wenn Nicht Jetzt, Wann Dann?"	Höhner		Not Too Late	Norah Jones	
2 March	"Ein Stern (…der deinen Namen trägt)"†	DJ Ötzi featuring Nik P.		Vaya Con Tioz	Böhse Onkelz	
9 March	"Ein Stern (…der deinen Namen trägt)"†	DJ Ötzi featuring Nik P.		Zimmer 483	Tokio Hotel	
16 March	"Ein Stern (…der deinen Namen trägt)"†	DJ Ötzi featuring Nik P.		12	Herbert Grönemeyer	
23 March	"Ein Stern (…der deinen Namen trägt)"†	DJ Ötzi featuring Nik P.		12	Herbert Grönemeyer	
30 March	"Ein Stern (…der deinen Namen trägt)"†	DJ Ötzi featuring Nik P.		12	Herbert Grönemeyer	
6 April	"Ein Stern (…der deinen Namen trägt)"†	DJ Ötzi featuring Nik P.		12	Herbert Grönemeyer	
13 April	"Ein Stern (…der deinen Namen trägt)"†	DJ Ötzi featuring Nik P.		12	Herbert Grönemeyer	
20 April	"Ein Stern (…der deinen Namen trägt)"†	DJ Ötzi featuring Nik P.		Fornika	Die Fantastichen Vier	
27 April	"Ein Stern (…der deinen Namen trägt)"†	DJ Ötzi featuring Nik P.		The Best Damn Thing	Avril Lavigne	
4 May	"Beautiful Liar"	Beyoncé and Shakira		Loose†	Nelly Furtado	
11 May	"Ein Stern (…der deinen Namen trägt)"†	DJ Ötzi featuring Nik P.		Call Me Irresponsible	Michael Bublé	
18 May	"Ein Stern (…der deinen Namen trägt)"†	DJ Ötzi featuring Nik P.		Bunter Hund	Reinhard Mey	
25 May	"Now or Never"	Mark Medlock		Minutes to Midnight	Linkin Park	
1 June	"Now or Never"	Mark Medlock		Minutes to Midnight	Linkin Park	
8 June	"Umbrella"	Rihanna featuring Jay-Z		Minutes to Midnight	Linkin Park	
15 June	"Umbrella"	Rihanna featuring Jay-Z		Minutes to Midnight	Linkin Park	
22 June	"Umbrella"	Rihanna featuring Jay-Z		Lost Highway	Bon Jovi	
29 June	"Umbrella"	Rihanna featuring Jay-Z		Mr. Lonely	Mark Medlock	
6 July	"Umbrella"	Rihanna featuring Jay-Z		Mr. Lonely	Mark Medlock	
13 July	"You Can Get It"	Mark Medlock featuring Dieter Bohlen		Mr. Lonely	Mark Medlock	
20 July	"Hot Summer"	Monrose		Jetzt erst recht	LaFee	
27 July	"You Can Get It"	Mark Medlock featuring Dieter Bohlen		Mr. Lonely	Mark Medlock	
3 August	"You Can Get It"	Mark Medlock featuring Dieter Bohlen		All 4 One	BeFour	
10 August	"You Can Get It"	Mark Medlock featuring Dieter Bohlen		The Biggest Bang	The Rolling Stones	
17 August	"Prison Break Anthem (Ich Glaub an Dich)"	Azad featuring Adel Tawil		La Bum	Sportfreunde Stiller	
24 August	"Hamma!"	Culcha Candela		All 4 One	BeFour	
31 August	"Hamma!"	Culcha Candela		Elvis the King	Elvis Presley	
7 September	"Hamma!"	Culcha Candela		Der helle Wahnsinn	Die Amigos	
14 September	"Hamma!"	Culcha Candela		7	Bushido	
21 September	"Hamma!"	Culcha Candela		7	Bushido	
28 September	"Hamma!"	Culcha Candela		All the Lost Souls	James Blunt	
5 October	"Don't Stop the Music"	Rihanna		All the Lost Souls	James Blunt	
12 October	"Don't Stop the Music"	Rihanna		Dark Passion Play	Nightwish	
19 October	"Junge"	Die Ärzte		Männer sind primitiv, aber glücklich!	Mario Barth	
26 October	"Hey There Delilah"	Plain White T's		Männer sind primitiv, aber glücklich!	Mario Barth	
2 November	"Hey There Delilah"	Plain White T's		Männer sind primitiv, aber glücklich!	Mario Barth	
9 November	"Hey There Delilah"	Plain White T's		Männer sind primitiv, aber glücklich!	Mario Barth	
16 November	"Du hast den schönsten Arsch der Welt"	Alex C. featuring Y-ass		Jazz ist anders	Die Ärzte	
23 November	"Apologize"	Timbaland featuring OneRepublic		Jazz ist anders	Die Ärzte	
30 November	"Apologize"	Timbaland featuring OneRepublic		Jazz ist anders	Die Ärzte	
7 December	"Apologize"	Timbaland featuring OneRepublic		Jazz ist anders	Die Ärzte	
14 December	"Apologize"	Timbaland featuring OneRepublic		Jazz ist anders	Die Ärzte	
21 December	"Apologize"	Timbaland featuring OneRepublic		Jazz ist anders	Die Ärzte	
28 December	No release (Note: Same issue as for 21 December.)					

== See also ==
- List of number-one hits (Germany)
- List of German airplay number-one songs
