= List of number-one hits of 2007 (Austria) =

This is a list of the Austrian Singles Chart number-one hits of 2007.

Issue date	Song	Artist
5 January	"All Good Things (Come to an End)"	Nelly Furtado
12 January	"All Good Things (Come to an End)"	Nelly Furtado
19 January	"All Good Things (Come to an End)"	Nelly Furtado
26 January	"All Good Things (Come to an End)"	Nelly Furtado
2 February	"All Good Things (Come to an End)"	Nelly Furtado
9 February	"Übers Ende der Welt"	Tokio Hotel
16 February	"Ein Stern (...der deinen Namen trägt)"	DJ Ötzi & Nik P.
23 February	"Ein Stern (...der deinen Namen trägt)"	DJ Ötzi & Nik P.
2 March	"Ein Stern (...der deinen Namen trägt)"	DJ Ötzi & Nik P.
9 March	"Ein Stern (...der deinen Namen trägt)"	DJ Ötzi & Nik P.
16 March	"Ein Stern (...der deinen Namen trägt)"	DJ Ötzi & Nik P.
23 March	"Ein Stern (...der deinen Namen trägt)"	DJ Ötzi & Nik P.
30 March	"Ein Stern (...der deinen Namen trägt)"	DJ Ötzi & Nik P.
6 April	"Ein Stern (...der deinen Namen trägt)"	DJ Ötzi & Nik P.
13 April	"Ein Stern (...der deinen Namen trägt)"	DJ Ötzi & Nik P.
20 April	"Ein Stern (...der deinen Namen trägt)"	DJ Ötzi & Nik P.
27 April	"Ein Stern (...der deinen Namen trägt)"	DJ Ötzi & Nik P.
4 May	"Ein Stern (...der deinen Namen trägt)"	DJ Ötzi & Nik P.
11 May	"Girlfriend"	Avril Lavigne
18 May	"Ein Stern (... der deinen Namen trägt)"	DJ Ötzi & Nik P.
25 May	"Now or Never"	Mark Medlock
1 June	"Now or Never"	Mark Medlock
8 June	"Now or Never"	Mark Medlock
15 June	"Dear Mr. President"	Pink
22 June	"Umbrella"	Rihanna featuring Jay-Z
29 June	"Umbrella"	Rihanna featuring Jay-Z
6 July	"Umbrella"	Rihanna featuring Jay-Z
13 July	"Hot Summer"	Monrose
20 July	"Umbrella"	Rihanna featuring Jay-Z
27 July	"Hot Summer"	Monrose
3 August	"Hot Summer"	Monrose
10 August	"Hot Summer"	Monrose
17 August	"Big Girls Don't Cry"	Fergie
24 August	"Big Girls Don't Cry"	Fergie
31 August	"Big Girls Don't Cry"	Fergie
7 September	"Big Girls Don't Cry"	Fergie
14 September	"1973"	James Blunt
21 September	"1973"	James Blunt
28 September	"1973"	James Blunt
5 October	"1973"	James Blunt
12 October	"Don't Stop the Music"	Rihanna
19 October	"Don't Stop the Music"	Rihanna
26 October	"Don't Stop the Music"	Rihanna
2 November	"Don't Stop the Music"	Rihanna
9 November	"Don't Stop the Music"	Rihanna
16 November	"Du hast den schönsten Arsch der Welt"	Alex C featuring Y-ass
23 November	"Du hast den schönsten Arsch der Welt"	Alex C featuring Y-ass
30 November	"Apologize"	Timbaland presents OneRepublic
7 December	"Apologize"	Timbaland presents OneRepublic
14 December	"Apologize"	Timbaland presents OneRepublic
21 December	"Apologize"	Timbaland presents OneRepublic
28 December	"Apologize"	Timbaland presents OneRepublic

== See also ==
- 2007 in music
