= Mark Medlock discography =

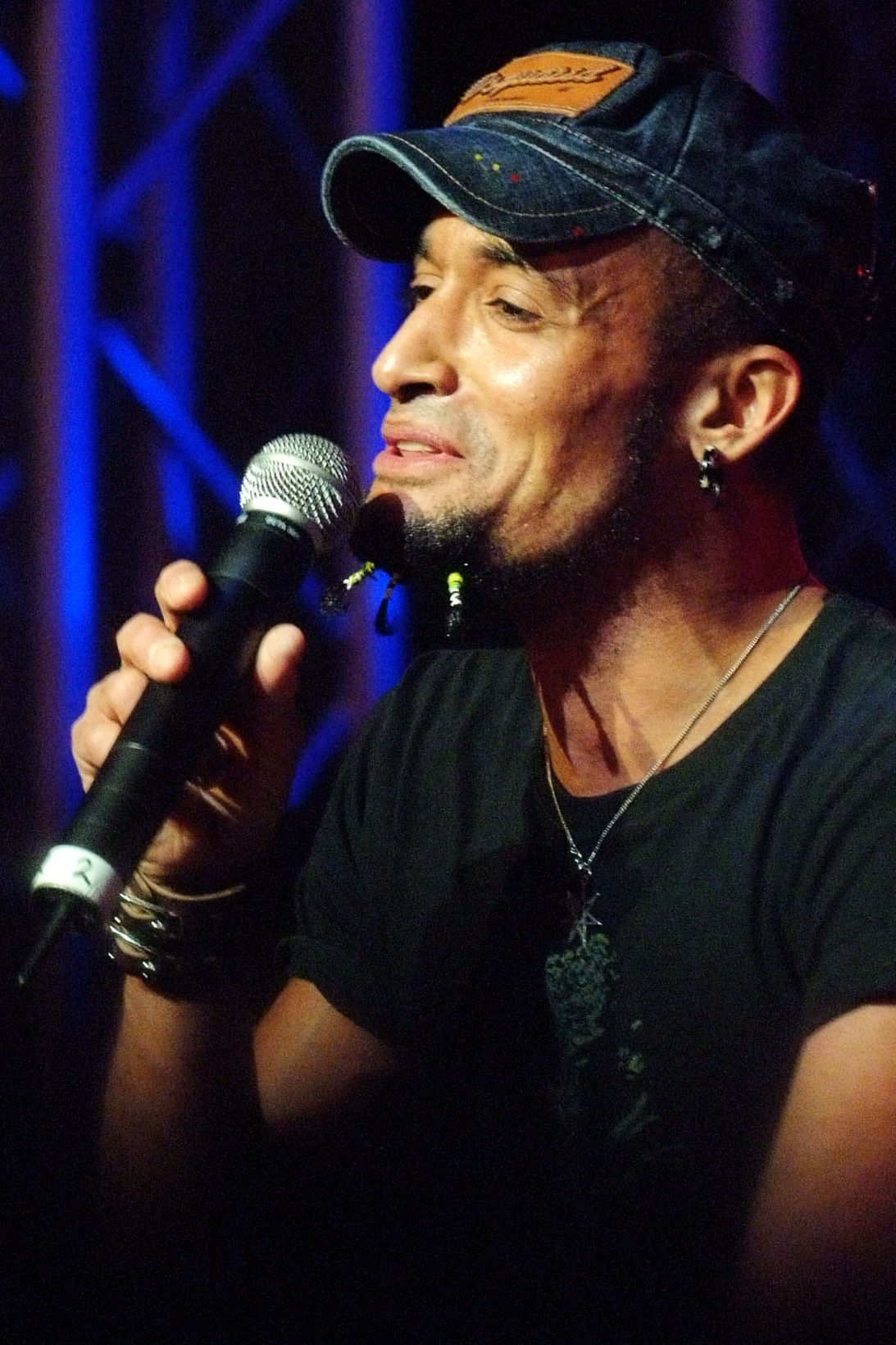
- Medlock in 2009.
- Studio albums: 8
- Compilation albums: 3
- Singles: 13
- Music videos: 11

This is a discography of the German singer Mark Medlock.

== Albums ==
=== Studio albums ===
List of albums, with selected chart positions and certifications
Title	Album details	Peak chart positions			Certifications
Title	Album details	GER	AUT	SWI	Certifications
Mr. Lonely	Released: 15 June 2007; Formats: CD, digital download	1	2	2	BVMI: Platinum (200,000); IFPI AUT: Gold (10,000); IFPI SWI: Gold (15,000)
Dreamcatcher (with Dieter Bohlen)	Released: 9 November 2007; Formats: CD, digital download	2	6	14	BVMI: Platinum (200,000); IFPI AUT: Gold (10,000)
Cloud Dancer	Released: 30 May 2008; Formats: CD, digital download	2	6	11	BVMI: Gold (100,000); IFPI AUT: Gold (10,000)
Club Tropicana	Released: 22 May 2009; Formats: CD, digital download	3	7	15	BVMI: Gold (100,000)
Rainbow's End	Released: 30 April 2010; Formats: CD, digital download	3	7	27	
My World	Released: 21 October 2011; Formats: CD, digital download	22	63	—	
Im Nebel	Released: 30 May 2014; Formats: CD, digital download	—	—	—	
Zwischenwelten	Released: 31 March 2017; Formats: CD, digital download	—	—	—	
Back into the Sun	Released: 14 August 2026; Formats: CD, digital download	6	23	—	

=== Compilations ===
- 2008: Album Collection (Box set compilation)
- 2013: Mr. Lonely / Dreamcatcher
- 2015: Best Of

=== Remixes ===
- 2011: Der Hit-Mix

=== Video albums ===
- 2008: Live in Offenbach
- 2008: Cloud Dancer (Deluxe-Edition)
- 2011: My World (Deluxe-Edition)

== EPs ==
- 2008: Famous 5: Mark Medlock

== Singles ==
List of singles, with selected chart positions and parent album
Title	Year	Peak chart positions			Album
Title	Year	GER	AUT	SWI	Album
"Now or Never"	2007	1	1	1	Mr. Lonely
"You Can Get It" (with Dieter Bohlen)	2007	1	3	3	Mr. Lonely
"Unbelievable" (with Dieter Bohlen)	2007	4	19	27	Dreamcatcher
"Summer Love"	2008	1	4	14	Cloud Dancer
"Mamacita"	2009	2	4	17	Club Tropicana
"Baby Blue"	2009	4	34	—	Club Tropicana
"Real Love"	2010	2	13	54	Rainbow's End
"Sweat (A La La La La Long)" (with Mehrzad Marashi)	2010	2	7	16	My Life
"Maria Maria"	2010	24	—	—	Rainbow's End
"The Other Side of Broken"	2011	55	—	—	My World

=== Other songs ===
- 2013: "Car Wash"
- 2017: "In Love with a Ghost"
- 2017: "When the Rain Comes"

== Music videos ==
List of music videos
Title	Year	Director(s)
"Now or Never"	2007	Robert Bröllochs
"You Can Get It"	2007	Nikolaj Georgiew
"Unbelievable"	2007	Nikolaj Georgiew
"Summer Love"	2008	Nikolaj Georgiew
"Mamacita"	2009	Nikolaj Georgiew
"Baby Blue"	2009	Nikolaj Georgiew
"Real Love"	2010	Nikolaj Georgiew
"Sweat (A La La La La Long)"	2010	Nikolaj Georgiew
"Maria Maria"	2010	Nikolaj Georgiew
"The Other Side of Broken"	2011	Nikolaj Georgiew
"Car Wash"	2013	Unknown
