= Lisa Bund =

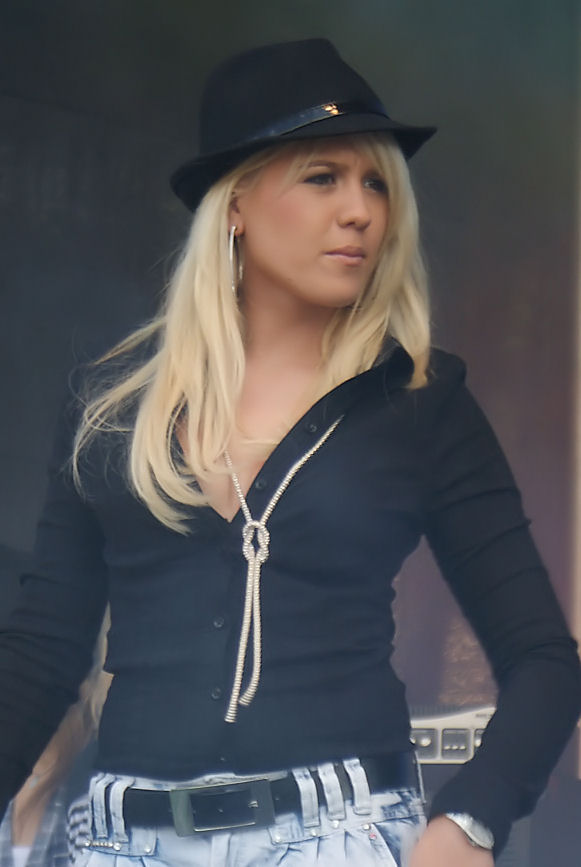
- Lisa Bund in July 2009

Background information
- Born: Anna-Lisa Bund; 31 May 1988 (age 37)
- Origin: Germany
- Genres: Pop music
- Occupations: Singer, songwriter, actor, radio host
- Years active: 2007–present

Lisa Bund (born Anna-Lisa Bund; 31 May 1988, in Frankfurt am Main, West Germany) is a German pop singer, songwriter, radio host, actor, and reality television star. She is best known for achieving third place in the fifth season of German casting show Deutschland sucht den Superstar ("Germany Seeks the Superstar" a.k.a. "German Idol"). Lisa Bund released her first album, Born Again in 2007. The first single was "Learn to Love You". It reached the Top-20 in the German single-charts. After the end of Deutschland sucht den Superstar (DSDS), she appeared in Ich bin ein Star – Holt mich hier raus! in 2008.

As a radio moderator, she worked during 2008–2009 for the radio program World Chart Show on RPR1. She played herself in the German Big Brother 11.

== Biography ==
=== Early life and beginnings ===
Lisa Bund grew up with her older brother and their parents in the Hessian town of Hattersheim am Main. There, she attended the Heinrich-Böll-Schule (school), graduating with the Mittlere Reife. She then began training as a hairdresser, which she broke off after a short time. She then worked for almost two years in her mother's lingerie business in the Altstadt district of Mainz.

Bund had her first experience with casting at the age of 13. In 2002, she applied for the talent competition Teenstar on RTL 2, without her parents' consent. When the organizers of the show, left an invitation to recall on her parents' answering machine, she had to withdraw from the competition. In the following years, she tried her luck at the competitions Star Search (Sat.1), and Popstars (ProSieben) in Germany, where she was eliminated early each time.

In the fall of 2006 she participated in the auditions for the talent show Deutschland sucht den Superstar. In the round of the last twenty, singing "Hurt" of Christina Aguilera and "A Woman's Worth" of Alicia Keys, she qualified for the theme shows. She always got good reviews from the jury during the motto shows, and was the last woman left.

=== 2007–2008: Reality shows, television appearance and studio album ===
In the semi-final she was eliminated, leaving Martin Stosch and Mark Medlock in the final.

Bund contributed to the track "(You Make Me Feel Like) A Natural Woman" to the compilation album Power of Love, which was recorded together with the nine other finalists, and sang along with the other candidates an interpretation of Harold Melvin's "If You Don't Know Me by Now". The album was released in March 2007 and reached number 3 on the German charts and was awarded gold, with over 100,000 units sold.

After the record company Sony BMG was contracted, Bund created, together with the producers Lukas Loules and Alex Christensen, her debut album, Born Again, to which the Berlin production team Valicon contributed some songs. Also featured on the album is a cover of a song by German artist Herbert Grönemeyer, which Bund had already sung at one of their appearances on German Idol. Lisa Bund received a brief guest role in the RTL TV serial Gute Zeiten, schlechte Zeiten (Good Times, Bad Times) on 10 July 2007. For release of their first album and its accompanying single (2007), Lisa was, among other things, on television station VIVA Live!. Back in August, the debut single "Learn to Love You" was released and went into the top 20. But also in Austria and Switzerland with some success.

Bund also took part, in January 2008, as 3rd Best of Ich bin ein Star – Holt mich hier raus!. This she had to leave prematurely because of an illness. So far the season was, however, the one with the highest ratings. In February she released her second single, "All That I Am" in two different editions, which also placed in the charts. It reached number 63 in the German charts. The video was shot in Hamburg. In April 2008, she ended her contract with record company Sony BMG. The album was awarded in December 2008 with gold.

=== 2009 – 2013 ===
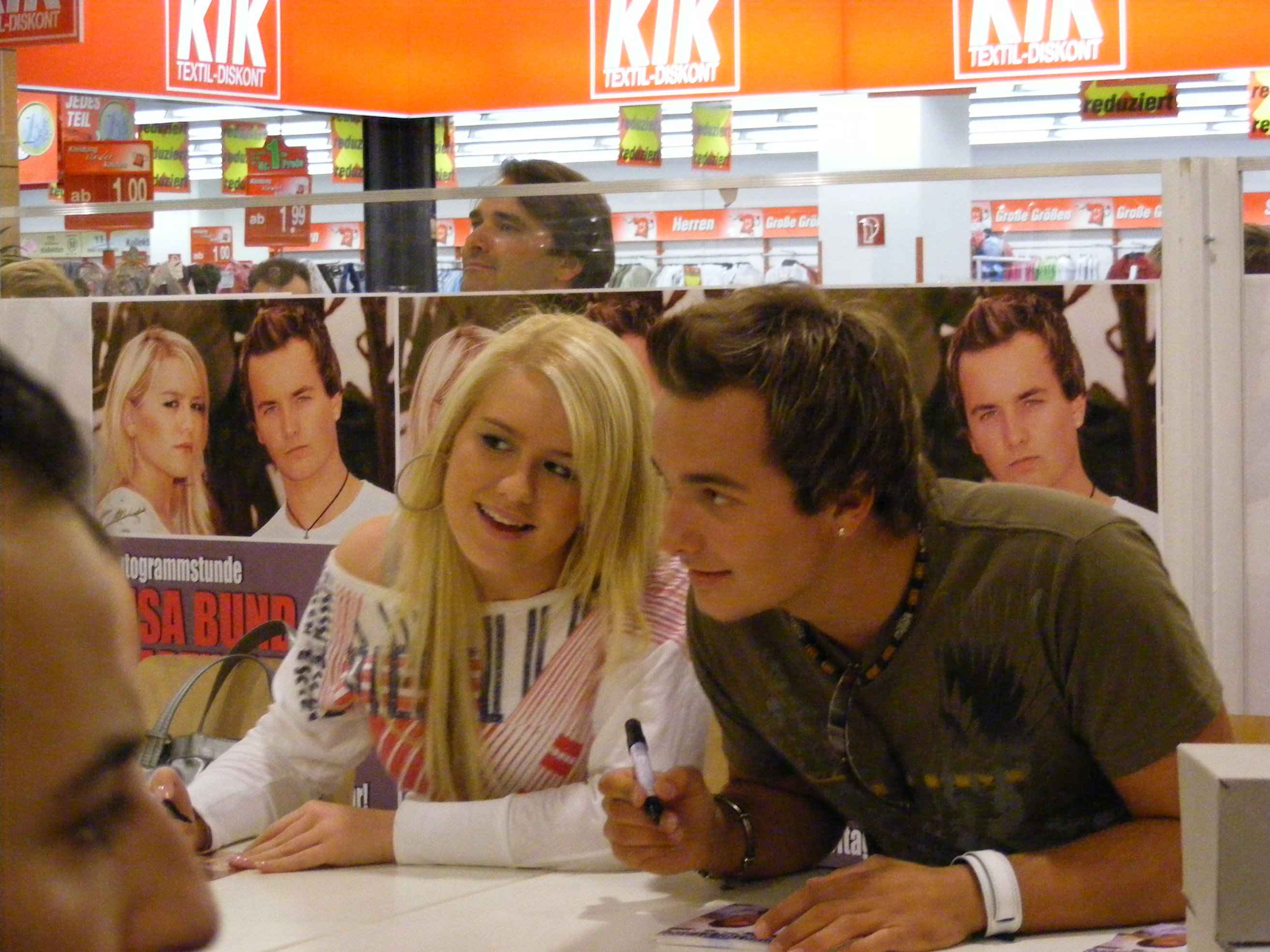
Bund with her duet partner Martin Stosch, after DSDS.

During April 2008 to November 2009, Bund worked as a presenter of the weekly radio show World Chart Show on RPR1. On 20 June 2008, she released the single "Have You Found...?" as a duet with German Idol colleague Martin Stosch. The accompanying music video was filmed in Mallorca, where the single would reach a low rank in the charts. Together with Martin Stosch, they then went on tour through Germany.

Bund was on 17 August 2008 in the TV show Come Dine with Me, where she won second prize, which would appear on the German channel VOX. On the topic of 'jungle camp' Lisa was on 14 February 2009 as a guest at Oliver Geissen, where she was known by other participants in the events of last season to reminisce. The rest of 2008 she spent with the fact that she sings at various festivals.

On 28 November 2008, the single "It's Christmas" was released, which was only offered as a digital download. Since 2009, Bund has been working on her second album, which was postponed until now. The new album is called On the Carousell, and the first single is "Can't Breathe". The songs she presented for the first time at the Children's Hospice Charity Concert 2009 in Groß-Gerau.

== Discography ==
=== Songs ===
- 2010: "Cryin' Tears"
- 2010: "Rock tha Nation"
- 2011: "Another Day"
- 2011: "Can't Breathe"
- 2012: "Nicht mit mir" (Not with Me)

=== Guest singles ===
Year	Title	Chart position			Album
Year	Title	GER	AUT	SWI	Album
2011	"Der Dschungel ist heiß" (with Zipfelpuben)"	49	-	-	Der Dschungel ruft wieder

=== Album appearances ===
Year	Song	Album	Artist
2011	"Der Dschungel ist heiß" (The Jungle Is Hot)	Der Dschungel ruft wieder	Various artist with Zipfelpuben
2011	"Immer wieder" (Always Again)	Der Dschungel ruft wieder	Indira Weis

== Filmography ==
Films
Year	Title	Role	Notes
2010	Atlantic Affairs	Lisa Wagner	Main role

=== Television and guest appearances ===
Television and guest appearances
Year	Title	Role	Notes
2008	Ich bin ein Star – Holt mich hier raus! (I Am a Star)	Herself	Reality television on RTL
2009–2010	Auf und davon – Mein Auslandstagebuch	Herself	Reality television on VOX
2010	Alles was zählt (All That Counts)	Mandy Ferner	Guest appearance (2 Episode)
2010	Promi Kocharena	Herself	Cooking Show
2011	Big Brother Germany (Season 11)	Herself	Reality television on RTL2
