= Unbelievable =

Unbelievable may refer to:

== Film and television ==
- Unbelievable!!!!!, a 2016 American film
- Unbelievable (miniseries), a 2019 American drama miniseries
- Unbelievable (TV series), a Japanese variety/documentary TV show that debuted in 1997
- The Unbelievable, a Hong Kong TV program about the paranormal and supernatural
- The Unbelievable With Dan Aykroyd, an American TV program about the paranormal and supernatural hosted by Dan Aykroyd
- Lawrence Leung's Unbelievable, an Australian TV program about the paranormal and supernatural

== Literature ==
- Unbelievable (novel), a 2008 Pretty Little Liars novel by Sara Shepard
- Unbelievable (short story collection), a 1987 short-story collection by Paul Jennings
- Unbelievable, a 2009 book by Stacy Horn
- Unbelievable, a 2017 memoir by Katy Tur

== Music ==
=== Albums ===
- Unbelievable (Diamond Rio album) or the title song (see below), 1998
- Unbelievable (Keke Wyatt album) or the title song, 2011
- Unbelievable (Sarah Connor album), 2002
- Unbelievable (Wang Leehom album), 2003
- Unbelievable, by Kym, 2006
- Unbelievable, an EP by Lisa Ajax, or the title song (see below), 2014

=== Songs ===
- "Unbelievable" (Bob Dylan song), 1990
- "Unbelievable" (Craig David song), 2006
- "Unbelievable" (Diamond Rio song), 1998
- "Unbelievable" (EMF song), 1990
- "Unbelievable" (Lisa Ajax song), 2014
- "Unbelievable" (The Notorious B.I.G. song), 1994
- "Unbelievable", by 24kGoldn, 2020
- "Unbelievable", by Elisse Boyd and Leonard Whitcup, 1947
- "Unbelievable", by Kaci Brown from Instigator, 2005
- "Unbelievable", by Mark Medlock and Dieter Bohlen, 2007
- "Unbelievable", by Nat King Cole from Ballads of the Day, 1956
- "Unbelievable", by Owl City and Hanson from Mobile Orchestra, 2015
- "Unbelievable", by Swati Reddy and Mynampati Sreeram Chandra from the film Katha Screenplay Darsakatvam Appalaraju, 2011
- "Unbelievable", by Tori Kelly from Tori, 2024
- "Unbelievable", by Why Don't We, 2019
- "Unbelievable", by Woo Jin-young, 2022
- "Unbelievable (Ann Marie)", by Josh Gracin from We Weren't Crazy, 2008

== See also ==
- Mr. Unbelievable, a 2015 Singaporean film
- The Unbelievable Truth (disambiguation)
- Believe (disambiguation)
