= Inconceivable =

Inconceivable may refer to:

== Books ==
- Inconceivable (novel), a 1999 novel by Ben Elton

== Film ==
- "Inconceivable!", a catch-phrase used by the character Vizzini (played by Wallace Shawn) in the 1987 film The Princess Bride
- Inconceivable, a 1998 American comedy film starring Corinne Bohrer
- Inconceivable (2008 film), a 2008 film directed by Mary McGuckian
- Inconceivable, also known as Deadly Ex, a 2016 American thriller film starring Natasha Henstridge
- Inconceivable (2017 film), a 2017 American thriller film starring Gina Gershon and Nicolas Cage

== Television ==
- Inconceivable (TV series), a 2005 TV series starring Angie Harmon
- Inconceivable, a 2017 web series starring Katie Stuart
- "Inconceivable", an episode from the ninth season of Law & Order: Special Victims Unit
- "Inconceivable", an episode from the third season of the U.S. TV series Perception
- "Inconceivable", an episode from the seventh season of Coach

== See also ==
- Unbelievable (disambiguation)
