= Mamacita =

Mamacita ("mommy" in Spanish) may refer to:

== People ==
- Chyna (1969–2016), WWE wrestler also known as Mamacita

== Art, entertainment, and media ==
- Mamacita, a contestant on Real Chance of Love

=== Albums ===
- Mamacita (Super Junior album), 2014
- Mamacita, compilation album by Riddim Driven

=== Songs ===
- "Mamacita" (Black Eyed Peas, Ozuna and J. Rey Soul song), 2020
- "Mamacita" (Mark Medlock song), 2009
- "Mamacita" (Public Announcement song), 2000
- "Mamacita" (Super Junior song), or "Mamacita (Ayaya)", 2014
- "Mamacita" (The Grass Roots song), 1975
- "Mamacita" (Tinie Tempah song), 2016
- "Mamacita", song by Baby Bash feat. Marcos Hernandez
- "Mamacita", song by Banaroo from the 2006 album Amazing
- "Mamacita", song by Bligg, 2014
- "Mamacita", song by Christian Nodal from Ayayay!, 2020
- "Mamacita", song by Cold War Kids from Chickens in Love
- "Mamacita", song by Collie Budz from the 2007 album Collie Buddz
- "Mamacita", song by Don Cisco from the 2000 album Oh Boy
- "Mamacita", song by Enrique Iglesias from the 2002 album Quizás
- "Mamacita", song by Fats Waller And His Rhythm, Waller, Anita Waller, 1954 covered by Joe Henderson, Jim Rotondi
- "Mamacita", song by Fulano de Tal, 1997
- "Mamacita", song by Heidi Brühl, Heidi Brühl, Danny Santos, 1982
- "Mamacita", song by Jason Derulo featuring Farruko, 2019
- "Mamacita", song by Jesse Jagz from the 2007 album Jagz Nation, Vol.1. Thy Nation Come
- "Mamacita", song by Jonny Z
- "Mamacita", instrumental by Kenny Dorham from Trompeta Toccata, 1964
- "Mamacita", song by Nora Aunor from the 1970 album Christmas with Nora Aunor
- "Mamacita", song by Outkast from Aquemini
- "Mamacita", song by Pharrell Williams and Daddy Yankee from The Fast and the Furious: Tokyo Drift soundtrack
- "Mamacita", song by Ray Slijngaard and Marvin D. as VIP Allstars, 1999
- "Mamacita", song by Ritchie Adams, 1976
- "Mamacita", song by The Electric Swing Circus from the 2017 album It Flew By
- "Mamacita", song by Travis Scott from Days Before Rodeo
- "Mamacita", song by Troop from the 1988 album Troop
- "Mamacita", song by Vybz Kartel
- "Mamacita (Paparico)", song by Julio Iglesias from the 2000 album Noche de Cuatro Lunas
- "¿Mamacita, Dónde Está Santa Claus?" song by Augie Rios, 1959

== Restaurants ==
- Mamacita Bay Area Restaurant of Lawrence Vavra and Christie Clark
- Mamacita's Mexican Food Restaurants (founded in 1985), Kerrville, Texas
