= The Unbelievable Truth =

The Unbelievable Truth may refer to:

- The Unbelievable Truth (radio show) a BBC radio panel game (started 2006)
- The Unbelievable Truth (TV series), a 2012 Australian television comedy series derived from the radio show of the same name
- The Unbelievable Truth (film), a 1989 comedy-drama film
- Unbelievable Truth, a British rock band

== See also ==
- Unbelievable (disambiguation)
- Truth (disambiguation)
