= Angel of Darkness (song) =

Single by Alex C. feat. Yasmin Knoch

from the album Euphorie
- Released: 2003
- Genre: Eurotrance
- Label: Epic Records
- Songwriter(s): Alex Christensen, Pete Könemann, Steffen Häfelinger
- Producer(s): Alex Christensen

Alex C. feat. Yasmin Knoch singles chronology
"Amigos Forever" (2003)	"Angel of Darkness" (2003)	"Du hast den schönsten Arsch der Welt" (2007)

"Angel of Darkness" is the third single by German composer Alex Christensen featuring vocals from Yasmin Knoch, which was released in 2003 by Epic Records. The song was released as a tie in with the video game Tomb Raider: The Angel of Darkness and peaked at number 21 on the German singles chart.

== Track listing ==
CD maxi-single
No.	Title	Length
1.	"Angel of Darkness (Video Mix)"	3:35
2.	"Angel of Darkness (Extended Mix)"	5:13
3.	"Angel of Darkness (Club Mix)"	5:57
4.	"Angel of Darkness (Angel_One Remix)"	6:56
5.	"Angel of Darkness (Watergate Remix)"	6:44

== Music video ==
A music video was shot in 2003 and directed by Nikolaj Georgiew and features scenes from the Tomb Raider: Angel of Darkness videogame.

== Charts ==
Chart (2003)	Peak position
Austria (Ö3 Austria Top 40)	39
Germany (GfK)	21

== Release history ==
Region	Year	Format	Label
Europe	14 July 2003	CD single	Epic Records
