= Postau =

- Municipality
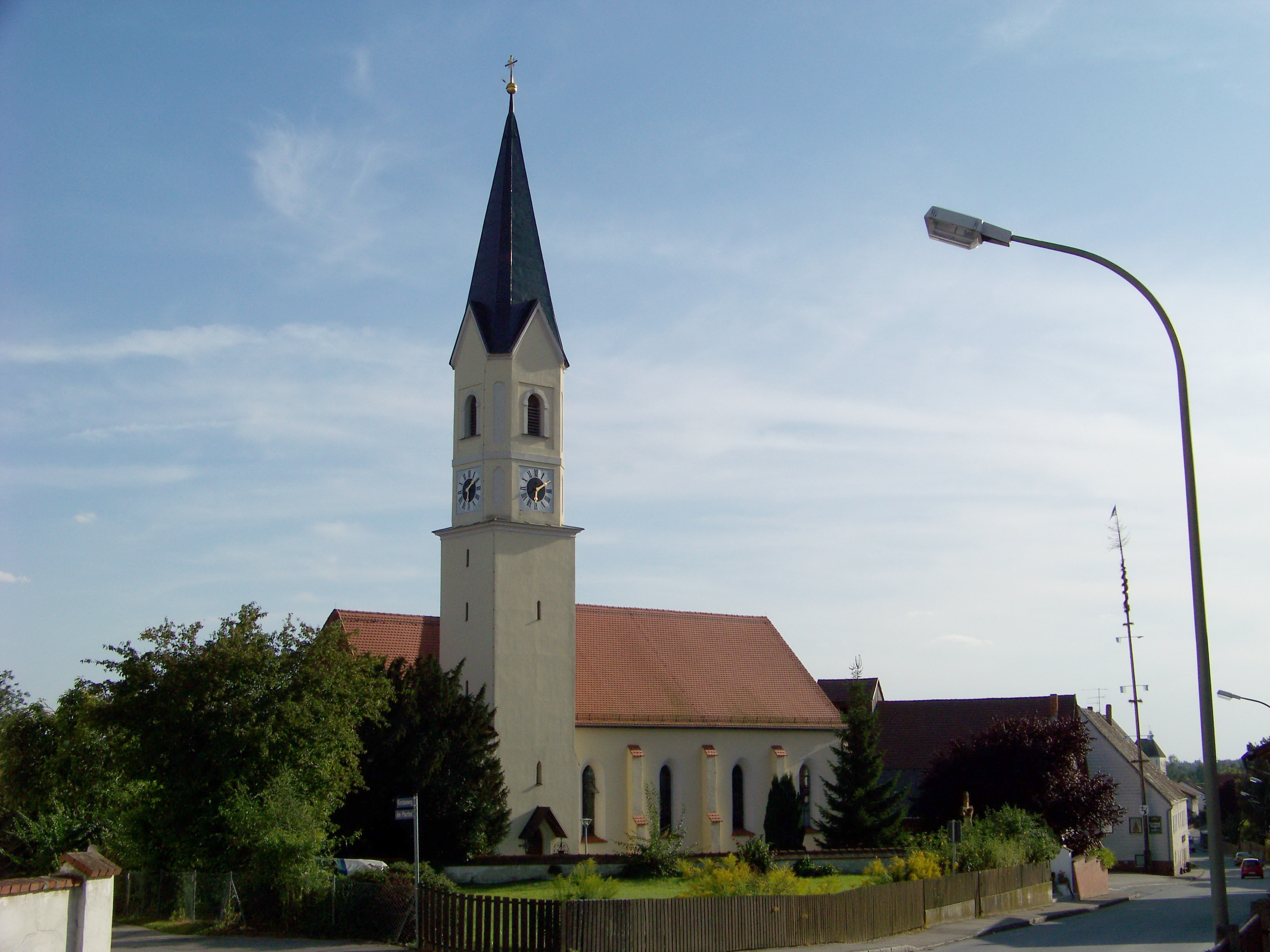
- Church of the Assumption of the Virgin Mary

- Coat of arms

- Location of Postau within Landshut district
- Interactive map of Postau
- Location within Germany Location within Bavaria
- Coordinates: 48°39′N 12°20′E
- Country: Germany
- State: Bavaria
- Admin. region: Niederbayern
- District: Landshut
- Municipal assoc.: Wörth an der Isar
- Subdivisions: 5 Ortsteile

Government
  - Mayor (2020–26): Johann Angstl

Area
  - Total: 34.84 km^{2} (13.45 sq mi)
- Elevation: 388 m (1,273 ft)

Population (2025-12-31)
  - Total: 1,684
  - Density: 48.34/km^{2} (125.2/sq mi)
- Time zone: UTC+01:00 (CET)
  - Summer (DST): UTC+02:00 (CEST)
- Postal codes: 84103
- Dialling codes: 08702
- Vehicle registration: LA
- Website: www.postau.de

Postau is a municipality in the district of Landshut in Bavaria in Germany.

== Famous residents ==
- Martin Stosch - DSDS Season 4 contestant.
