= Mr. Lonely (Mark Medlock album) =

Studio album by Mark Medlock
- Released: 15 June 2007
- Length: 58:30
- Label: Sony BMG
- Producer: Dieter Bohlen

Mark Medlock chronology
| Mr. Lonely (2007) | Dreamcatcher (2007) |

Mr. Lonely is the debut album by German singer Mark Medlock, the winner of the fourth season of Deutschland Sucht Den Superstar, the German version of American Idol. It was released by Sony BMG on 15 June 2007 in German-speaking Europe. Entirely written and produced by DSDS judge Dieter Bohlen, the album features Medlock's coronation song "Now or Never", which reached the top of the charts in Austria, Germany, and Switzerland, as well as follow-up "You Can Get It", his second number-one hit.

== Promotion ==
The album was supported by two singles released in 2007, both of which contributed significantly to its commercial visibility. The lead single, Medlock's coronation song "Now or Never", achieved major success, reaching number one in Germany, Austria, and Switzerland. It was followed by "You Can Get It", a collaboration with Dieter Bohlen, which also performed well commercially, peaking at number one in Germany and reaching the top three in both Austria and Switzerland.

== Critical reception ==
Professional ratings
Review scores
| Source | Rating |
|---|---|
| laut.de | 2/5 stars |

Dani Fromm from laut.de rated the album two out of five stars. She stated that the album was "'Kuschelrock-suspect, saccharine pop without soul," describing it as formulaic, mainstream-oriented pop that lacks individuality and emotional depth. Fromm further criticized the "overly polished production" and "lichéd lyrics," arguing that they fail to make use of the singer's distinctive vocal potential.

== Chart performance ==
Mr. Lonely was a major commercial success in the German-speaking markets. It debuted at number one in Germany and reached number two in both the Austrian Albums Chart and the Swiss Albums Chart, becoming the highest-charting album by any Deutschland sucht den Superstar winner since debut season winner Alexander Klaws' Take Your Chance (2003). A major seller, it was ranked 11th on the German year-end chart. In terms of certifications, Mr. Lonely was awarded gold status in Austria and Switzerland, and platinum in Germany, reflecting shipments of 10,000, 15,000, and 200,000 units respectively.

== Track listing ==
All tracks written and produced by Dieter Bohlen; co-produced by Joachim "Jeo" Mezei.

Mr. Lonely track listing
| No. | Title | Length |
|---|---|---|
| 1. | "Now or Never" | 3:13 |
| 2. | "You Are So Beautiful" | 4:15 |
| 3. | "Seven Days" | 4:08 |
| 4. | "Relax Your Heart" | 3:31 |
| 5. | "Mr. Lonely" | 3:40 |
| 6. | "You Can Get It" | 3:41 |
| 7. | "Everytime You Go Away" | 3:56 |
| 8. | "Just like Heaven" | 3:46 |
| 9. | "Oh Sarah" | 4:11 |
| 10. | "I Miss You" | 4:02 |
| 11. | "If You Just Call Me" | 3:33 |
| 12. | "I'm Just a Dreamer" | 3:25 |
| 13. | "Sad Sad Story" | 4:44 |
| 14. | "Only a Fool" | 3:33 |
| Total length: | | 58:30 |

== Charts ==
=== Weekly charts ===
Weekly chart performance for Mr. Lonely
| Chart (2007) | Peak position |
|---|---|
| Austrian Albums (Ö3 Austria) | 2 |
| German Albums (Offizielle Top 100) | 1 |
| Swiss Albums (Schweizer Hitparade) | 2 |

=== Year-end charts ===
Year-end chart performance for Mr. Lonely
| Chart (2007) | Position |
|---|---|
| Austrian Albums (Ö3 Austria) | 48 |
| German Albums (Offizielle Top 100) | 11 |
| Swiss Albums (Schweizer Hitparade) | 45 |

== Certifications ==
Certifications for Mr. Lonley
| Region | Certification | Certified units/sales |
|---|---|---|
| Austria (IFPI Austria) | Gold | 10,000^{*} |
| Germany (BVMI) | Platinum | 200,000^{^} |
| Switzerland (IFPI Switzerland) | Gold | 15,000^{^} |
^{*} Sales figures based on certification alone.^{^} Shipments figures based on certification alone.
