= Torn (Lisa Ajax song) =

Single by Lisa Ajax
- Released: February 23, 2019
- Label: Universal Music
- Songwriter(s): Isa Molin
- Producer(s): Robin Stjernberg

Lisa Ajax singles chronology
"Think About You" (2018)	"Torn" (2019)	"Jag måste" (2020)

"Torn" is a song by Swedish singer Lisa Ajax. The song was performed for the first time in Melodifestivalen 2019, where it first made it to the ”Second Chance round”, and then made it to the final and subsequently finished in ninth place.

== Charts ==
Chart (2019)	Peak position
Sweden (Sverigetopplistan)	9
