= Martin Stosch =

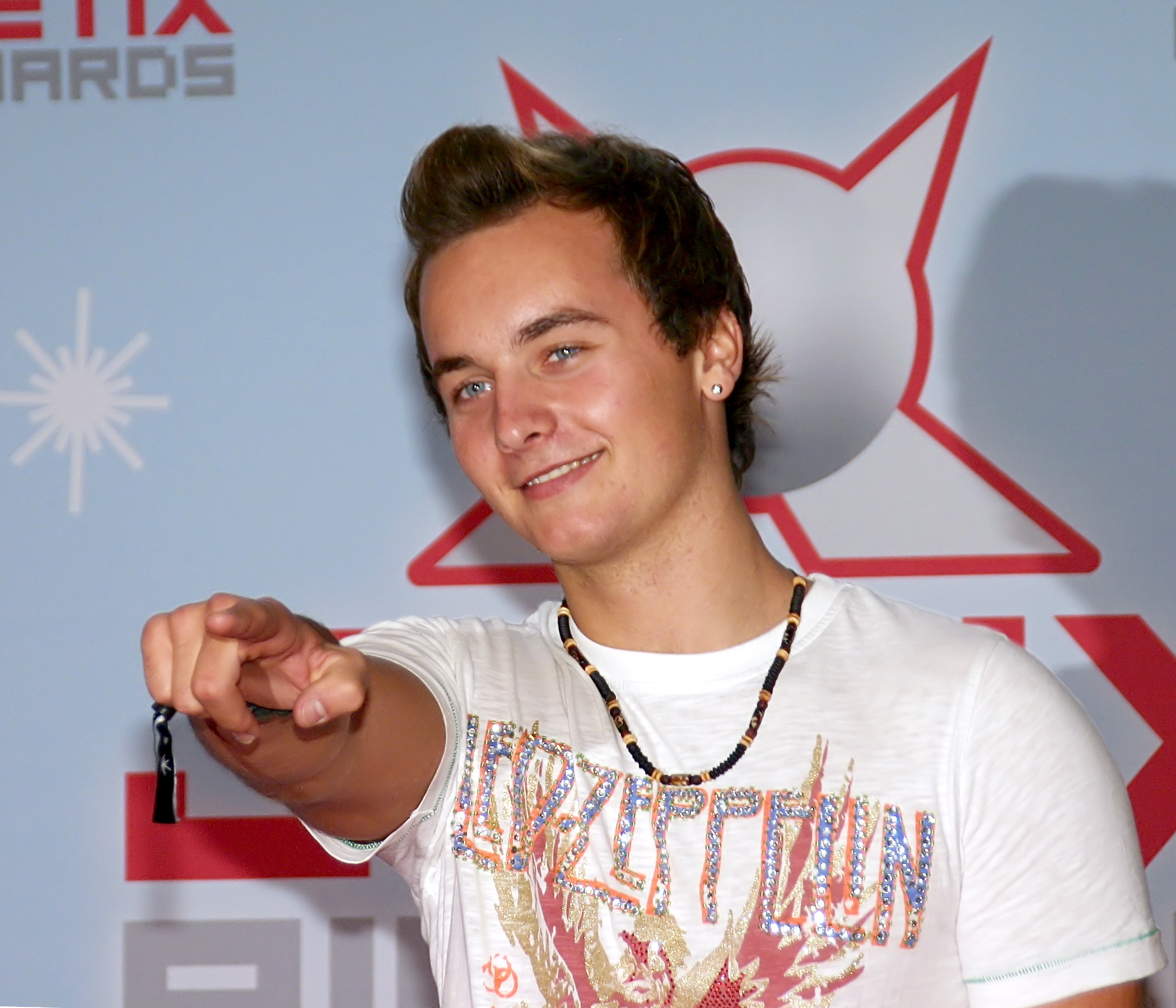
- Stosch in 2008

Background information
- Also known as: Martin Stosch
- Born: Martin Stosch; 30 July 1990 (age 35)
- Origin: Landshut, Bavaria, West Germany
- Genres: Pop
- Occupation: Singer
- Years active: 2007–present
- Labels: DaredoMusic & BeatPowerMusic
- Website: martinstosch.biz//

Martin Stosch (born 30 July 1990) is a German singer and the runner-up of the fourth season of the television show Deutschland sucht den Superstar (DSDS), the German version of Pop Idol.

== Biography ==
=== Personal life ===
Stosch was born on 30 July 1990 in Landshut, West Germany. His parents are Bernhard Stosch and Elisabeth Stosch and he has two sisters, Sandra and Vanessa. Before the fourth season of DSDS he was to be on a school band, as very good guitarist. Today, he lives in Postau a small township in Lower Bavaria.

=== Deutschland sucht den Superstar ===
In September 2006, he attended the show's casting in Munich and inspired the jury with his two songs "Tears in Heaven" by Eric Clapton and "Wake Me Up When September Ends" by Green Day. In the Top 20 shows he convinced the public to vote for him, as he sang the songs: "Home" by Michael Bublé and Westlife's cover of "Mandy". Stosch made it to the Top 10, only to be in the bottom group every week up to his elimination. However, Max Buskohl, who was a favorite to win the competition along with Mark Medlock, dropped out of the competition to sign a record contract with his band. Thus, Stosch returned to the show and made it to the finale against Medlock in which he became the runner up.

==== Performance at Deutschland sucht den Superstar ====
Top-20-Show	Song	Originalinterpret	Caller in Percent
1. Top-20-Show (7 February 2007)	Home	Michael Bublé	12.11% (Position 4 of 9)
3. Top-20-Show (14 February 2007)	Mandy	Westlife	20.40% (Position 2 of 8)
Mottoshow	Song	Originalinterpret	Caller in Percent
Greatest Hits (24 February 2007)	Tears in Heaven	Eric Clapton	7.59% (Position 5 of 10)
Greatest Hits of the 80s and 90s (10 March 2007)	Love Is All Around	Wet Wet Wet	7.69% (Position 7 of 9)
Power of Love (17 March 2007)	If Tomorrow Never Comes	Ronan Keating	9.24% (Position 6 of 8)
Today's Hits (31 March 2007)	Upside Down	Jack Johnson	10,61 % (Position 6 of 7)
Big Band (7 April 2007)	Night and Day	Frank Sinatra	10.30% (Position 5 of 6)
Greatest Divas and Heroes of Music (14 April 2007)	Crazy Little Thing Called Love	Queen	15.36% (Position 4 of 5)
Greatest Divas and Heroes of Music (14 April 2007)	She's The One	Robbie Williams	15.36% (Position 4 of 5)
Hits of the 70s / Dedicated to… to … (21 April 2007)	You to Me Are Everything	The Real Thing	15.43% (Position 4 of 4)
Hits of the 70s / Dedicated to… to … (21 April 2007)	Und wenn ein Lied	Söhne Mannheims	15.43% (Position 4 of 4)
Judges' Choice (28 April 2007)	Rockin' All Over the World (selected by Heinz Henn)	Status Quo	22.27% (Position 2 of 3)
Judges' Choice (28 April 2007)	Sunday Morning (selected by Anja Lukaseder)	Maroon 5	22.27% (Position 2 of 3)
Judges' Choice (28 April 2007)	I Swear (selected by Dieter Bohlen)	All-4-One	22.27% (Position 2 of 3)
Finale (5 May 2007)	Life Is a Rollercoaster	Ronan Keating	21.89% (Position 2 of 2)
Finale (5 May 2007)	Crazy Little Thing Called Love	Queen	21.89% (Position 2 of 2)
Finale (5 May 2007)	I Can Reach Heaven from Here	Martin Stosch (written by Jörgen Elofsson)	21.89% (Position 2 of 2)

== Discography ==
=== Album ===
- 7teen (18 April 2008)

=== Singles ===
Year	Title	Chart positions	Album
Year	Title	GER	Album
2008	"Zeit Meines Lebens"	30	7teen
2008	"Geh Nicht Einfach Weg"	79	7teen
2008	Have You Found...? (feat. Lisa Bund	92	7teen
2009	"Ich liebe Dich nicht mehr"		–

=== Appearances ===
- 2007: Power of Love (joined release of all finale participants of DSDS)
  - "If Tomorrow Never Comes"
  - "If You Don't Know Me by Now" (Martin and the DSDS-Top-10)

=== Undisclosed ===
- 2007: I Can Reach Heaven From Here (Written by Jörgen Elofsson, however contain on the Album)
