= Unbelievable (Lisa Ajax song) =

Single by Lisa Ajax

from the album Unbelievable
- Released: 5 December 2014
- Genre: pop
- Length: 3:30
- Label: Capitol Music Group Sweden
- Songwriter(s): Jimmy Jansson, Micha Wilshire, Lori Wilshire

Lisa Ajax singles chronology
"Love Run Free" (2014)	"Unbelievable" (2014)	"Twisted" (2014)

"Unbelievable" is a song written by Jimmy Jansson, Micha Wilshire, and Lori Wilshire. It was performed by Lisa Ajax in the finals of Idol 2014 as the winner-song.

== Charts ==
Chart (2014)	Peak position
Sweden (Sverigetopplistan)	14
