= Deutschland sucht den Superstar season 4 =

Season of television series

Deutschland sucht den Superstar
- Season 4
- The Season 4 cast: from left to right: (on top) Francisca, Jonathan, Laura, Thomas, Lauren, (bottom) Mark, Max, Julia, Martin, Lisa
- Starring: Judges; Dieter Bohlen; Heinz Henn; Anja Lukaseder
- No. of episodes: 20

Release
- Original network: RTL
- Original release: 10 January – 5 May 2007

Season chronology
- ← Previous; Season 3 Next → Season 5

The fourth season of Deutschland sucht den Superstar was aired on German channel RTL from February to May 2007. Mark Medlock, the season's winner, was awarded a contract with Sony BMG. The judges in this season were Dieter Bohlen, Heinz Henn, Anja Lukaseder. It was hosted by Marco Schreyl and Tooske Ragas. The viewers chose the contestant's fates as they were able to call for their favorite contestant. The voting results were published on 7 May. The winner got a 10-year contract and €100,000. Twenty percent went to the winner's manager who was chosen by the creators.

== Finalists ==
(Ages stated at time of contest)

Contestant	Age	Hometown	Voted off	Liveshow theme
Mark Medlock	28	Offenbach	Winner	Grand Finale
Martin Stosch	16	Postau	21 April 2007/5 May 2007	Hits of the 70s/Dedicated to... Grand Finale
Lisa Bund	18	Hattersheim am Main	28 April 2007	Judge's Choice
Max Buskohl	18	Berlin	Withdrew	
Lauren Talbot	16	Winsen	14 April 2007	The Greatest Divas and Heroes of Music
Thomas Enns	24	Cologne	7 April 2007	Big Band
Francisca Urio	25	Berlin	31 March 2007	Today's Hits
Julia Falke	18	Fürstenzell	17 March 2007	Power of Love
Jonathan Enns	19	Cologne	10 March 2007	The Greatest Hits of the 80s and 90s
Laura Martin	27	Neu-Isenburg	24 February 2007	The Greatest Hits of All Time

== Controversies ==
Contestant Lisa Bund caused a controversy on 10 March when the headline of the German tabloid newspaper Bild read that she fought with bullying, and harassment by some of the other contestants. On 14 March, Bild Online reported about a loud argument between Bund and former contestant Tristan Iser, which happened to have also been filmed by a mobile phone camera. Bund stated in an online diary entry that she felt the video was "like a bad horror movie".

On 22 April, Bild announced that contestant Max Buskohl quit the competition due to RTL's rejection of his request to let his school band Empty Trash get a recording contract alongside him. Viewers had wondered about judge Dieter Bohlen's uncharacteristic behavior when he gave an extremely critical review of Buskohl's performance on 21 April. Buskohl is alleged to have said that Bohlen was antisocial, which explains Bohlen's negative reaction.

Contestant Martin Stosch, who was eliminated on 21 April, remained as a contestant despite being voted off the week prior, replacing Buskohl. However, Buskohl's father Carl Carlton told Spiegel Online that his son already made his decision to leave on 19 April but waited until Sunday to make his announcement at request of RTL.

Judges Dieter Bohlen and Heinz Henn had started a quarrel with each other during the show. On 14 April's show, Henn made it clear that he did not agree with contestant Mark Medlock's song choices. Bohlen, a staunch supporter of Medlock, began imitating Henn during his review of Lisa Bund's performance. Henn later stated that he thought it was "in bad taste, in bad style and disrespectful towards the contestants".

On 24 April, German entertainer Stefan Raab announced a performance by Buskohl set for 25 April at his show TV total which at that time aired on RTL's rival television channel ProSieben. RTL pronounced against a performance by Buskohl and his band Empty Trash on TV total the next day. So during his show on 25 and 26 April, Raab publicly instigated a protest demonstration set for Saturday's Deutschland sucht den Superstar show and was said to have obtained about 120 tickets. However the show eventually went off without any disturbance.

== Top 20 ==
=== 1st Top 20 Show (Boys) ===
Original airdate: 7 February 2007

Contestant	Song (Artist)	Percentage/ calls
Dennis Haberlach	When You Say Nothing at All (Ronan Keating)	12,81% (3/9)
Arcangelo Vigneri	I Believe I Can Fly (R. Kelly)	3,01% (7/9)
Lindsay Stebe	Father And Son (Cat Stevens)	2,35% (8/9)
Martin Stosch	Home (Michael Bublé)	12,11% (4/9)
Aleksan Cetinkaya	Now and Forever (Richard Marx)	1,78% (9/9)
Max Buskohl	Bad Day (Daniel Powter)	7,94% (5/9)
Jonathan Enns	Hero (Enrique Iglesias)	5,86% (6/9)
Thomas Enns	Circle of Life (Elton John)	12,89% (2/9)
Mark Medlock	Easy (Lionel Richie)	41,25% (1/9)
Roman Lob	ordered by medical professionals to not perform	0,0%

- Bottom four: Jonathan Enns, Aleksan Cetinkaya, Arcangelo Vigneri, Lindsay Stebe
- Eliminated: Aleksan Cetinkaya and Lindsay Stebe
- Judges' forecasts: Aleksan Cetinkaya and Lindsay Stebe (Bohlen, Lukaseder, Henn)

=== 2nd Top 20 Show (Girls) ===
Original airdate: 10 February 2007

Contestant	Song (Artist)	Percentage/ calls
Laura Martin	Against All Odds (Mariah Carey)	4,85% (6/10)
Nebiha Celenler	Durch die Nacht (Silbermond)	2,24% (9/10)
Prisilla Harris	Ain't Nobody (Chaka Khan)	3,65% (7/10)
Sarah Jahncke	Glaub an mich (Yvonne Catterfeld)	6,66% (5/10)
Madeleine Boly	Unfaithful (Rihanna)	0,96% (10/10)
Julia Falke	Family Portrait (Pink)	7,40% (4/10)
Dominika Mrugala	Dieses Leben (Juli)	3,39% (8/10)
Lauren Talbot	Don't Speak (No Doubt)	12,87% (3/10)
Francisca Urio	Without You (Mariah Carey)	19,46% (2/10)
Lisa Bund	Hurt (Christina Aguilera)	38,52% (1/10)

- Bottom five: Julia Falke, Dominika Mrugala, Madeleine Boly, Sarah Jahncke, Nebiha Celenler
- Eliminated: Nebiha Celenler, Madeleine Boly, Dominika Mrugala
- Judges' forecasts: Nebiha Celenler, Madeleine Boly, Dominika Mrugala (Bohlen, Lukaseder, Henn)

=== 3rd Top 20 Show (Boys) ===
Original airdate: 15 February 2007

- Tristan Iser is there for Roman Lob, who withdrew due to illness. Eventually, Lob was asked back for the season 5 theme shows, but declined due to his studies.

Contestant	Song (Artist)	Percentage/ calls
Max Buskohl	Sweet Home Alabama (Lynyrd Skynyrd)	9,24% (5/8)
Dennis Haberlach	Every Breath You Take (The Police)	8,59% (6/8)
Arcangelo Vigneri	Senza una donna (Zucchero)	7,26% (7/8)
Thomas Enns	Still Got the Blues (Gary Moore)	9,66% (4/8)
Tristan Iser	Can't Wait Until Tonight (Max Mutzke)	0,93% (8/8)
Jonathan Enns	Breathe Easy (Blue)	10,69% (3/8)
Mark Medlock	Ain't No Sunshine (Bill Withers)	33,23% (1/8)
Martin Stosch	Mandy (Westlife)	20,40% (2/8)

- Bottom five: Jonathan Enns, Arcangelo Vigneri, Tristan Iser, Martin Stosch, Dennis Haberlach
- Eliminated: Dennis Haberlash, Arcangelo Vigneri, Tristan Iser
- Judges' forecasts: Jonathan Enns, Martin Stosch, Tristan Iser (Bohlen, Lukaseder, Henn)

=== 4th Top 20 Show (Girls) ===
Original airdate: 17 February 2007

Contestant	Song (Artist)	Percentage/ calls
Julia Falke	Like The Way I Do (Melissa Etheridge)	7,53% (4/7)
Laura Martin	Have I Told You Lately (Rod Stewart)	4,06% (5/7)
Lauren Talbot	Don't Know Why (Norah Jones)	20,87% (3/7)
Priscilla Harris	What's Love Got to Do With It (Tina Turner)	2,32% (7/7)
Sarah Jahncke	I Turn to You (Christina Aguilera)	3,84% (6/7)
Lisa Bund	A Woman's Worth (Alicia Keys)	31,33% (1/7)
Francisca Urio	Get Here (Oleta Adams)	30,05% (2/7)

- Bottom four: Sarah Jahncke, Laura Martin, Priscilla Harris, Julia Falke
- Eliminated: Sarah Jahncke and Priscilla Harris
- Judges' forecasts: Sarah Jahncke and Priscilla Harris (Bohlen, Lukaseder, Henn)

== Finals ==
=== 1st Theme Show: "Die größten Hits aller Zeiten" (Greatest Hits of All Time) ===
Original airdate: 24 February 2007

Contestant	Song (Artist)	Percentage/ calls
Martin Stosch	Tears in Heaven (Eric Clapton)	7,59% (5/10)
Julia Falke	What's Up (4 Non Blondes)	3,90% (9/10)
Thomas Enns	Iris (Goo Goo Dolls)	6,20% (6/10)
Laura Martin	Don't Wanna Lose You (Gloria Estefan)	2,45% (10/10)
Max Buskohl	Fly Away (Lenny Kravitz)	6,00% (7/10)
Lauren Talbot	I'm Like a Bird (Nelly Furtado)	7,62% (4/10)
Jonathan Enns	Angels (Robbie Williams)	4,16% (8/10)
Francisca Urio	Lady Marmalade (Christina Aguilera, Pink, Mýa, Lil' Kim)	15,00% (3/10)
Mark Medlock	Hello (Lionel Richie)	25,85% (1/10)
Lisa Bund	Because of You (Kelly Clarkson)	21,24% (2/10)

- Bottom four: Laura Martin, Julia Falke, Jonathan Enns, Martin Stosch
- Eliminated: Laura Martin
- Judges' forecasts: Laura Martin (Bohlen), Jonathan Enns (Henn, Lukaseder)

=== 2nd Theme Show: "Die größten Hits der 80er und 90er" (Greatest Hits of the 80s and 90s) ===
Original airdate: 10 March 2007

Contestant	Song (Artist)	Percentage/ calls
Thomas Enns	Died in Your Arms Tonight (Cutting Crew)	5,96% (8/9)
Martin Stosch	Love Is All Around (Wet Wet Wet)	7,69% (7/9)
Francisca Urio	Licence to Kill (Gladys Knight)	10,51% (4/9)
Jonathan Enns	Truly Madly Deeply (Savage Garden)	4,03% (9/9)
Max Buskohl	Gimme All Your Lovin (ZZ Top)	8,92% (5/9)
Lisa Bund	Greatest Love of All (Whitney Houston)	11,79% (3/9)
Julia Falke	Total Eclipse of the Heart (Bonnie Tyler)	8,52% (6/9)
Lauren Talbot	Nothing Compares 2 U (Sinéad O'Connor)	11,80% (2/9)
Mark Medlock	Unchain My Heart (Joe Cocker)	30,77% (1/9)

- Bottom four: Thomas Enns, Martin Stosch, Max Buskohl, Jonathan Enns
- Eliminated: Jonathan Enns
- Judges' forecasts: Julia Falke (Lukaseder, Bohlen), Jonathan Enns (Henn)

=== 3rd Theme Show: "Power of Love" ===
Original airdate: 17 March

On 19 March 2007 a CD featuring all of the songs from the show and an additional version of If You Don't Know Me By Now by Simply Red sung by all contestants was released.

Contestant	Song (Artist)	Percentage/ calls
Martin Stosch	If Tomorrow Never Comes (Ronan Keating)	9,24% (6/8)
Lauren Talbot	True Colors (Cyndi Lauper)	6,83% (7/8)
Julia Falke	Angel (Sarah McLachlan)	5,24% (8/8)
Max Buskohl	Here Without You (3 Doors Down)	14,33% (3/8)
Mark Medlock	Endless Love (Lionel Richie)	30,43% (1/8)
Thomas Enns	I Want to Know What Love Is (Foreigner)	9,34% (5/8)
Francisca Urio	If I Ain't Got You (Alicia Keys)	9,59% (4/8)
Lisa Bund	(You Make Me Feel Like) A Natural Woman (Aretha Franklin)	14,99% (2/8)

- Bottom four: Lauren Talbot, Julia Falke, Martin Stosch, Thomas Enns
- Eliminated: Julia Falke
- Judges' forecasts: Julia Falke (Bohlen, Henn, Lukaseder)

=== 4th Theme Show: "Hits von heute" (Today's Hits) ===
Original airdate: 31 March 2007

For the first time in the history of Deutschland sucht den Superstar the show aired at the same time as "Wetten, dass..?" (one of the most successful TV shows in Europe) on the public channel ZDF.

Contestant	Song (Artist)	Percentage/ calls
Max Buskohl	This Love (Maroon 5)	11,75% (3/7)
Lisa Bund	Nobody Knows (Pink)	11,74% (4/7)
Martin Stosch	Upside Down (Jack Johnson)	10,61% (6/7)
Lauren Talbot	Too Lost in You (Sugababes)	12,38% (2/7)
Thomas Enns	Hero (Chad Kroeger)	11,42% (5/7)
Francisca Urio	Beautiful (Christina Aguilera)	10,46% (7/7)
Mark Medlock	You Give Me Something (James Morrison)	31,64% (1/7)

- Bottom four: Martin Stosch, Lauren Talbot, Thomas Enns, Francisca Urio
- Eliminated: Francisca Urio
- Judges' forecasts: Lauren Talbot (Bohlen, Henn, Lukaseder)

Beside the show's contestants another casting candidate was eventually given the chance to perform on stage namely Menderes Bagcı who had come to every season's casting audition never getting an admission ticket for the casting call-back. He performed Beat It by Michael Jackson on stage.

The viewers' decision in this episode came as a complete surprise, as Urio, who was eliminated this time, ranked among this season's best and most favored contestants. Before the decision, jury member Dieter Bohlen ironically predicted Urio's elimination in what he thought was an April fool hoax. Subsequently, he and his co-judges watched the decision with dismay and shock written all over their faces.

=== 5th Theme Show: "Big Band" ===
Original airdate: 7 April 2007

This was the first theme show to be co-hosted by female host Tooske Ragas along with Marco Schreyl in this season of Deutschland sucht den Superstar. Ragas gave birth to her daughter and was not able to present the first four theme shows.

Contestant	Song (Artist)	Percentage/ calls
Martin Stosch	Night and Day (Frank Sinatra)	10,30% (5/6)
Thomas Enns	You Are the Sunshine of My Life (Frank Sinatra)	8,70% (6/6)
Max Buskohl	Hit the Road Jack (Ray Charles)	17,78% (2/6)
Lauren Talbot	Summertime (Ella Fitzgerald)	12,65% (4/6)
Mark Medlock	Unforgettable (Nat King Cole)	34,62% (1/6)
Lisa Bund	What a Diff'rence a Day Made (Dinah Washington)	15,95% (3/6)

- Bottom four: Thomas Enns, Martin Stosch, Lauren Talbot, Lisa Bund
- Eliminated: Thomas Enns
- Judges' forecasts: Thomas Enns (Bohlen, Henn, Lukaseder)

=== 6th Theme Show: "Die größten Diven und Helden der Musik" (Greatest Divas and Heroes of Music) ===
Original airdate: 14 April 2007

Contestant	Song (Artist)	Percentage/ calls
Max Buskohl	I Was Made for Lovin' You (Kiss)	19,88% (2/5)
Max Buskohl	Suspicious Minds (Elvis Presley)	19,88% (2/5)
Lauren Talbot	Secret (Madonna)	9,03% (5/5)
Lauren Talbot	Fields of Gold (Sting)	9,03% (5/5)
Mark Medlock	I Heard It Through the Grapevine (Marvin Gaye)	36,06% (1/5)
Mark Medlock	Three Times a Lady (Lionel Richie)	36,06% (1/5)
Martin Stosch	Crazy Little Thing Called Love (Queen)	15,36% (4/5)
Martin Stosch	She's the One (Robbie Williams)	15,36% (4/5)
Lisa Bund	Who Knew (Pink)	19,67% (3/5)
Lisa Bund	Flugzeuge im Bauch (Herbert Grönemeyer)	19,67% (3/5)

- Bottom three: Martin Stosch, Max Buskohl, Lauren Talbot
- Eliminated: Lauren Talbot
- Judges' forecasts: Mark Medlock (Henn), Lauren Talbot (Bohlen), Martin Stosch (Lukaseder)

Once again Menderes Bagcı was given the permission to perform on stage. This time he chose Bad by Michael Jackson.

=== 7th Theme Show: "Hits der 70er / Dedicated to…" (Hits of the 70s / Dedicated to…) ===
Original airdate: 21 April 2007

Contestant	Song (Artist)	Percentage/ calls
Martin Stosch	You to Me Are Everything (The Real Thing)	15,43% (4/4)
Martin Stosch	Und wenn ein Lied (Söhne Mannheims)	15,43% (4/4)
Max Buskohl	All Right Now (Free)	19,80% (2/4)
Max Buskohl	When You Were Young (The Killers)	19,80% (2/4)
Lisa Bund	It's Raining Men (The Weather Girls)	16,63% (3/4)
Lisa Bund	Das Beste (Silbermond)	16,63% (3/4)
Mark Medlock	You're the First, the Last, My Everything (Barry White)	48,13% (1/4)
Mark Medlock	Stand by Me (Ben E. King)	48,13% (1/4)

- Bottom three: Max Buskohl, Martin Stosch, Lisa Bund
- Eliminated: Martin Stosch
- Judges' forecasts: Martin Stosch (Henn, Lukaseder, Bohlen)

On 22 April, Bild newspaper announced that contestant Max Buskohl was dismissed by RTL Television afterwards. (See Controversies.)

=== 8th Theme Show: "Songs der Jury" (Judges' Choice) ===
Original airdate: 28 April 2007

Contestant	Song (Artist)	Percentage/ calls
Martin Stosch	Rockin' All Over the World (Status Quo) … chosen by Heinz Henn	22,27% (2/3)
Martin Stosch	Sunday Morning (Maroon 5) … chosen by Anja Lukaseder	22,27% (2/3)
Martin Stosch	I Swear (All-4-One) … chosen by Dieter Bohlen	22,27% (2/3)
Lisa Bund	Baby Love (Mother's Finest) … chosen by Heinz Henn	18,73% (3/3)
Lisa Bund	Geile Zeit (Juli) … chosen by Anja Lukaseder	18,73% (3/3)
Lisa Bund	There You'll Be (Faith Hill) … chosen by Dieter Bohlen	18,73% (3/3)
Mark Medlock	You Can Leave Your Hat On (Joe Cocker) … chosen by Heinz Henn	59,00% (1/3)
Mark Medlock	My Girl (The Temptations) … chosen by Anja Lukaseder	59,00% (1/3)
Mark Medlock	(Sittin' on) the Dock of the Bay (Otis Redding) … chosen by Dieter Bohlen	59,00% (1/3)

- Bottom three: Lisa Bund, Martin Stosch, Mark Medlock
- Eliminated: Lisa Bund
- Judges' forecasts: Martin Stosch (Bohlen, Lukaseder, Henn)

=== 9th Theme Show: Final ===
Original airdate: 5 May 2007

Contestant	Song (Artist)	Percentage/ calls
Martin Stosch	Life Is a Rollercoaster (Ronan Keating)	21,98% (2/2)
Martin Stosch	Crazy Little Thing Called Love (Queen)	21,98% (2/2)
Martin Stosch	I Can Reach Heaven from Here (Martin Stosch)	21,98% (2/2)
Mark Medlock	What a Wonderful World (Louis Armstrong)	78,02% (1/2)
Mark Medlock	Easy (The Commodores)	78,02% (1/2)
Mark Medlock	Now or Never (Mark Medlock)	78,02% (1/2)

The two finalists performed Elton John's and George Michael's Don't Let the Sun Go Down on Me together on stage.

- Winner: Mark Medlock
- Runner-up: Martin Stosch
- Judges' forecasts of who would win: Mark Medlock (Lukaseder, Bohlen), irresolute (Henn)

== Top 10 candidates ==
=== Mark Medlock ===
Mark Medlock, born on 9 July 1978 in Frankfurt, was the winner of the 4th season. His father Lauria immigrated from Georgia, United States, and was a gospel singer. Medlock is openly gay. Prior to his participation of Deutschland sucht den Superstar, he worked as a nurse.

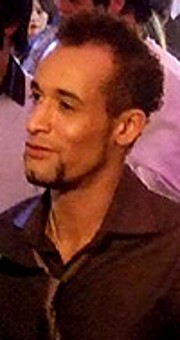
Mark Medlock

=== Martin Stosch ===
Martin Stosch was born on 30 July 1990 in Landshut. He was the youngest male contestant of the show. Being voted out in the seventh theme show, he returned as a replacement for Max Buskohl, who quit the contest by his own will after having serious disagreements with jury member Dieter Bohlen.

=== Lisa Bund ===
Lisa Bund was born 31 May 1988 in Frankfurt. He received a lot of promotional support by the German media. She later signed a recording contract and released her first single "Learn to Love You" on 31 August 2007.

=== Max Buskohl ===
Max Buskohl is from Berlin. He auditioned for DSDS because he lost a bet. He was part of a band called Empty Trash. He stated in an interview with Der Spiegel that he left DSDS voluntarily, while RTL claims they threw out Max. He was considered a heartthrob on the show with his "super-slim" body and being 1.95 m (6 ft 5 in) tall.

=== Lauren Talbot ===
Lauren Talbot was born on 15 March 1990 in Hanover. She was the youngest female contestant in season 4.

=== Francisca Urio ===
Francisca Urio, born on 6 February 1981 in Meiningen, is an only child to a German mother and a Tanzanian father.

=== Julia Falke ===
Julia Falke was born on 21 June 1988 in Schärding, Austria.

== Elimination chart ==
Legend
Did not perform	Female	Male	Top 20	Top 10	Winner

Safe	Most votes	Safe First	Safe Last	Withdrew	Eliminated	Did not perform

Stage:		Semi				Finals								
Week:		2/8	2/12	2/16	2/20	2/24	3/10	3/17	3/24	3/31	4/7	4/20	4/28	5/5
Place	Contestant	Result												
1	Mark Medlock	1st 41,25%		1st 33,23%		1st 25,85%	1st 30,77%	1st 30,43%	1st 31,64%	1st 34,62%	1st 36,06%	1st 48,13%	1st 59,00%	Winner; 78,02%
2	Martin Stosch	4th 12,11%		2nd 20,40%		5th 7,59%	7th 7,69%	6th 9,24%	6th 10,61%	5th 10,30%	4th 15,36%	4th 15,43%	2nd 22,27%	Runner-Up; 21,98%
3	Lisa Bund		1st 38,52%		1st 31,33%	2nd 21,24%	3rd 11,79%	2nd 14,99%	4th 11,74%	3rd 15,95%	3rd 19,67%	3rd 16,63%	3rd 18,73%	
4	Max Buskohl	5th 9,24%		5th 7,94%		7th 6,00%	5th 8,95%	3rd 14,33%	3rd 11,75%	2nd 17,78%	2nd 19,88%	2nd 19,80%		
5	Lauren Talbot		3rd 12,87%		3rd 20,87%	4th 7,62%	2nd 11,80%	7th 6,83%	2nd 12,38%	4th 12,65%	5th 9,03%			
6	Thomas Enns	2nd 12,89%		4th 9,66%		6th 6,20%	8th 5,96%	5th 9,34%	5th 11,42%	6th 8,70%				
7	Franziska Urio		2nd 19,46%		2nd 30,05%	3rd 15,00%	4th 10,51%	4th 9,59%	7th 10,46%					
8	Julia Falke		4th 7,40%		4th 7,53%	9th 3,90%	6th 8,52%	8th 5,24%						
9	Jonathan Enns	6th 5,86%		3rd 10,69%		8th 2,45%	9th 4,03%							
10	Laura Martin		6th 4,85%		5th 4,06%	10th 2,45%								
11-15	Sarah Jahncke		5th 6,66%		Elim									
11-15	Priscilla Harris		7th 3,65%		Elim									
11-15	Dennis Haberlach	3rd 12,81%		Elim										
11-15	Arcangelo Vigneri	7th 3,01%		Elim										
11-15	Tristan Iser			Elim										
16-20	Dominika Mrugala		Elim											
16-20	Nebiha Celenler		Elim											
16-20	Madeleine Boly		Elim											
16-20	Lindsay Stebe	Elim												
16-20	Aleksan Celtinkaya	Elim												

Note:

- Bottom 3/4 indicates that the contestant was 'saved' last. The Bottom Group results are based on published results after the show that determined the number of percentages for each contestant. This may or may not indicate his or her actual vote rank.
- Martin Stosch brought back when Max Buskohl withdrew from the competition.
- Roman Lob withdrew from the competition due to illness in the second Top 20 show and was replaced by Tristan Iser.

Preceded by Season 3 (2005/06)	Deutschland sucht den Superstar; Season 4 (2007)	Succeeded by Season 5 (2008)
