= Mamacita (Mark Medlock song) =

2009 single by Mark Medlock

Single by Mark Medlock

from the album Club Tropicana
- Released: April 24, 2009
- Length: 3:35
- Label: Columbia
- Songwriter(s): Dieter Bohlen
- Producer(s): Dieter Bohlen

Mark Medlock singles chronology
"Summer Love" (2008)	"Mamacita" (2009)	"Baby Blue" (2009)

"Mamacita" is the first single release from Mark Medlock's debut album Club Tropicana. The single was released on 24 April 2009. It is written, composed, arranged and produced by the German artist Dieter Bohlen.

== Track listings ==
- CD single Columbia 88697 52104 2, 24 April 2009
1. "Mamacita" (Single Version) 3:33
2. "Mamacita" (Karaoke Version) 4:07
- CD maxi-single Columbia 88697 52106 2, 24 April 2009
1. "Mamacita" (Single Version) 3:33
2. "Mamacita" (Karaoke Version) 4:07
3. "Heart to Heart" (Alana Remix) - 3:52

== Credits ==
- Lyrics and music - Dieter Bohlen
- Arrangement - Dieter Bohlen
- Production - Dieter Bohlen
- Co-production - Jeo
- Art direction - Ronald Reinsberg
- Photography - Nikolaj Georgiew
- Publication - Blue Obsession/Warner Chappell
- Mixing - Jeo@Jeopark

== Charts ==
Chart (2009)	Peak position
Austria (Ö3 Austria Top 40)	4
Germany (GfK)	2
Switzerland (Schweizer Hitparade)	17
