= Lisa Ajax =

Swedish singer, and winner of Idol 2014

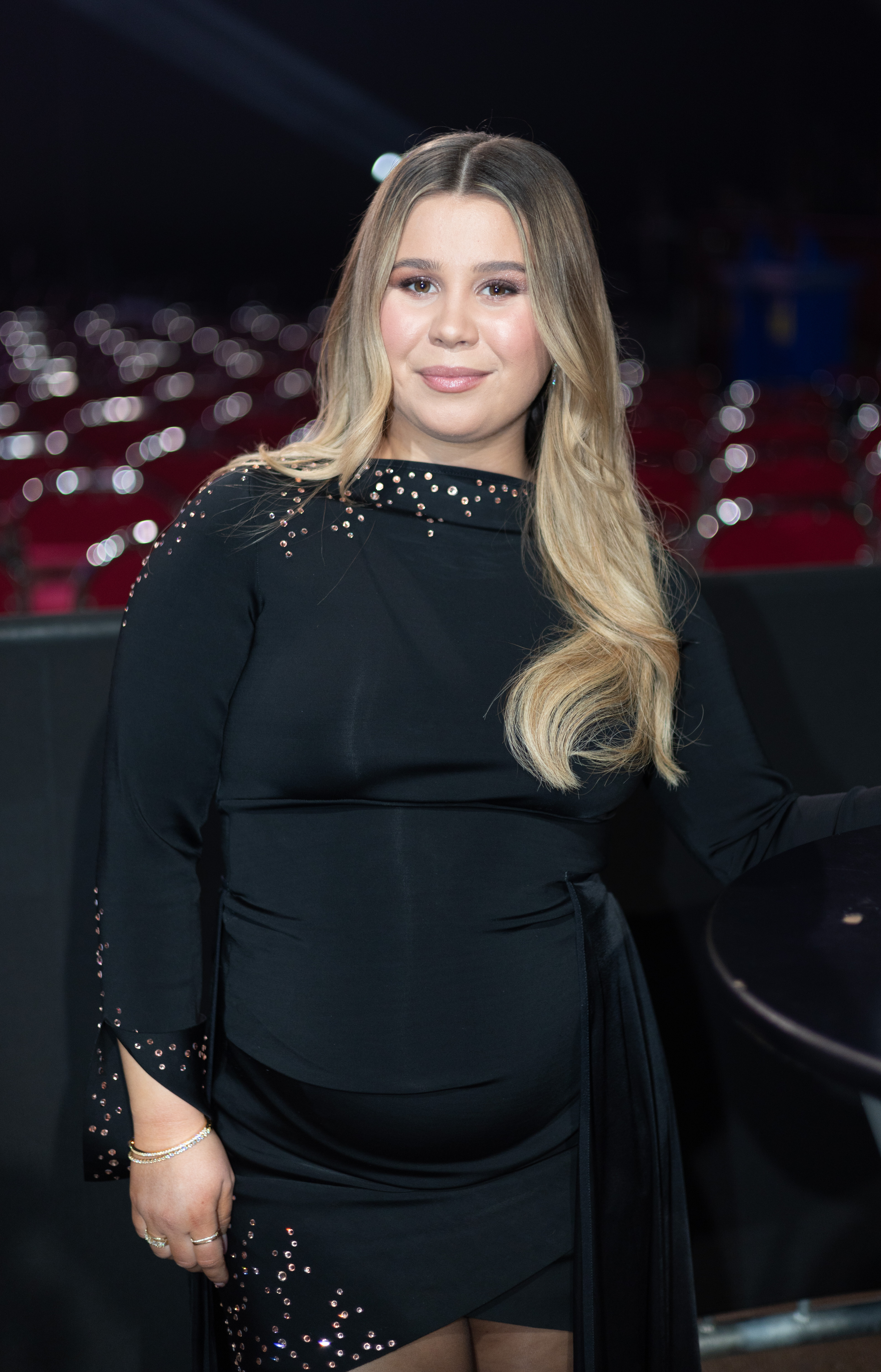
- Lisa Ajax in 2024

Background information
- Born: Lisa Kristina Ajax; 13 August 1998 (age 28); Järfälla, Sweden
- Genres: Pop
- Years active: 2012–present
- Label: Capitol Records

Lisa Kristina Ajax (born 13 August 1998) is a Swedish singer. She began her career after winning Idol 2014, and is also known for her five Melodifestivalen participations, having qualified to the final on four occasions.

== Career ==
After participating at Lilla Melodifestivalen 2012 with the song "Allt som jag har" and winning Idol 2014, Ajax participated in Melodifestivalen 2016 with the song "My Heart Wants Me Dead", qualifying to the final at Friends Arena. She placed seventh in the final.

On 30 November 2016, the Swedish broadcaster, SVT, revealed the participants of Melodifestivalen 2017. Ajax participated with the song "I Don't Give A". She qualified to andra chansen from the second semi-final. She went to the final on 11 March 2017 where she placed ninth.

On 27 November 2018, it was revealed that Ajax would participate in Melodifestivalen 2019 with the song "Torn", in the last semi-final. She again qualified to the Second Chance round from the fourth semi-final and went on to the final, where she finished in ninth place.

In 2021, Ajax released her first Swedish-language solo single, "Jag måste", co-written with and Anton Engdahl, Marcus Holmberg. For the single, she changed management and label.

She participated in Melodifestivalen 2022 with the song "Tror du att jag bryr mig" with Niello. They performed in Heat 2 on 12 February 2022, finishing in last place and failing to qualify.

She competed as a celebrity dancer in Let's Dance 2022, broadcast by TV4.

She participated for a fifth time in Melodifestivalen in 2024, with the song "Awful Liar". She performed in Heat 1 and won the second round of voting, qualifying to the final of 9 March 2024.

Lisa Ajax won the fifth season of Masked Singer Sverige, which was broadcast on TV4.

== Personal life ==
Ajax is in a relationship with fellow musician Max "Klockrent" Huss, three years her senior. In December 2023, the couple announced they were expecting their first child.

== Discography ==
=== EPs ===
Title	Details	Peak chart positions
Title	Details	SWE
Unbelievable	Released: 12 December 2014; Label: Universal Music AB; Format: Digital download	2
Collection	Released: 19 May 2017; Label: Capitol; Format: Digital download	—

=== Singles ===
Title	Year	Peak chart positions	Certifications	Album
Title	Year	SWE	Certifications	Album
"Love Run Free"	2014	55		Unbelievable
"Unbelievable"	2014	14	GLF: Gold	Unbelievable
"Blue Eyed Girl"	2015	—		Non-album single
"My Heart Wants Me Dead"	2016	10	GLF: Platinum	Collection
"Give Me That"	2016	—		Collection
"Love Me Wicked"	2016	—		Collection
"I Don't Give A"	2017	25	GLF: Gold	Collection
"Number One" (with Atle)	2017	—		Collection
"Think About You"	2018	— (Note: "Think About You" did not enter the Swedish Singellista Chart, but peaked at number 18 on the Swedish Heatseeker Chart.)		Non-album single
"Torn"	2019	9	GLF: Platinum	Melodifestivalen 2019
"Jag måste"	2020	—		Non-album single
"Tror du att jag bryr mig" (with Niello)	2022	7	GLF: Gold	Melodifestivalen 2022
"Awful Liar"	2024	20		Non-album single
"—" denotes a single that did not chart or was not released in that territory.
