= Du hast den schönsten Arsch der Welt =

2007 single by Alex C.

Single by Alex C. feat. Y-ass

from the album Euphorie
- Language: German
- English title: "You Have the Sweetest Ass in the World"
- Released: 19 October 2007
- Genre: Eurodance
- Length: 3:35
- Label: Polydor; 313 Music; Universal Music Group; King Size
- Songwriters: Alex Christensen; Peter Könemann
- Producer: Alex Christensen

Alex C. feat. Y-ass singles chronology
"Angel of Darkness" (2003)	"Du hast den schönsten Arsch der Welt" (2007)	"Doktorspiele" (2008)

Music video
- "Du hast den schönsten Arsch der Welt" on YouTube

"Du hast den schönsten Arsch der Welt" (English: "You Have the Sweetest Ass in the World") is a German-language song by dance music producer and DJ Alex C. (Alex Christensen). It was recorded in cooperation with and featuring singer Y-ass. Also in 2007, Basshunter made a remix of the song titled "Du hast den schönsten Arsch der Welt (Bass My Ass Remix)". The song itself is a cover version of The Soundlovers' 1996 song "Run Away".

The song marked an international breakthrough for Alex Christensen. Due to the song receiving high ratings on several foreign dance charts, it was re-released in several other languages including in English as "Sweetest Ass in the World" as well as in French, Spanish, Dutch and Czech.

== Awards and nominations ==
Alex C. and Y-ass took part with the song in the 2008 Sopot Hit Festival music competition and were the overall runners-up with 29.7% of the votes in the category International Hit Summer 2008 losing to the eventual winner "Hey Hi Hello" by Shaun Baker feat. MaLoY (55.2%). The song was nominated for "Best Song of the Year" at the VIVA Comet Awards in 2008.

== Recordings in other languages ==
In some countries the melody and the lyrics were adjusted to fit the taste of the local inhabitants. The English and Spanish versions were recorded by Alex C and Y-ass, while other versions are covers by other artists. Some of these versions are:

- Alex C feat. Y-ass – "Sweetest Ass in the World" (English)
- Alex C feat. Y-ass – "Tienes el culo más bello del mundo" (Spanish)
- Mr. Vee & Michaela – "Máš nejhezčí zadek na světě" (Czech)
- Trasero – "Lekkerste kont van het land" (Dutch)
- Släm – Sul on kõige kaunim kann (Estonian)

== Gummibär version ==
"Jaj, De Szép A Popóm!"

Song by Gummibär

from the album Gumidiszkó!
- Released: February 19, 2008
- Genre: Electronic, Eurodance, Techno
- Length: 3:41
- Label: CLS
- Songwriters: Christian André Schneider, Christian Philipp Schneider
- Lyricist: Christian Philipp Schneider
- Producers: Christian André Schneider, Christian Philipp Schneider

In 2008, German Eurodance multilingual character and virtual musician Gummibär covered "Du hast den schönsten Arsch der Welt" and released it first as "Jaj, De Szép A Popóm!" in his fifth album Gumidiszkó!. In 2009, he released it as "Jaj De Szep A Popom" in Nuki Nuki. And lastly, he released it in same year with the same name as in Nuki Nuki in Dança Com O Gummy!.

== Chart performance ==
"Du hast den schönsten Arsch der Welt" is the only number-one hit for Alex C. as a solo act on the German Singles Chart, although he had a number-one hit in 1992 as part of U96 with the song "Das Boot". "Du hast den schönsten Arsch der Welt" stayed for one week at the top for the week of 16 November 2007. The song also topped the Austrian Top 40 for two weeks, on 16 and 23 November 2007.

=== Weekly charts ===
Chart (2007–2008)	Peak position
Austria (Ö3 Austria Top 40)	1
Belgium (Ultratop 50 Flanders)	27
CIS Airplay (TopHit)	12
Czech Republic Airplay (ČNS IFPI)	12
Europe (Eurochart Hot 100)	10
Germany (GfK)	1
Netherlands (Single Top 100)	38
Russia Airplay (TopHit)	5
Slovakia Airplay (ČNS IFPI)	71
Sweden (Sverigetopplistan)	57
Switzerland (Schweizer Hitparade)	50

=== Year-end charts ===
Chart (2007)	Position
Austria (Ö3 Austria Top 40)	30
Germany (Media Control GfK)	40

Chart (2008)	Position
Austria (Ö3 Austria Top 40)	27
CIS (TopHit)	54
Europe (Eurochart Hot 100)	66
Germany (Media Control GfK)	36
Russia Airplay (TopHit)	57

=== Decade-end charts ===
Chart (2000–2009)	Position
Germany (Media Control GfK)	48

== Certifications ==
Region	Certification	Certified units/sales
Germany (BVMI)	Gold	150,000^{^}
^{^} Shipments figures based on certification alone.
