= Yasmin K. =

German singer

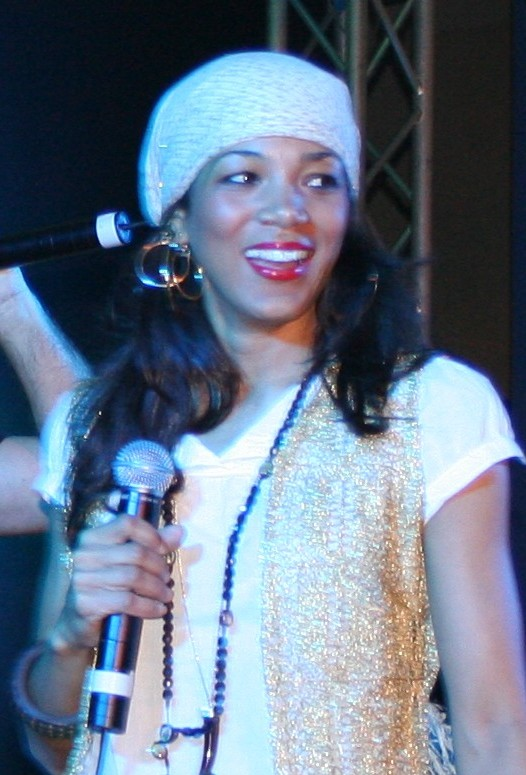
- Yasmin K. in 2008

Background information
- Also known as: Yasmin K.; Yasmin Knock; Y-ass
- Born: Yasmin Knoch; Soufrière, Saint Lucia
- Origin: Germany
- Genres: Pop, Europop, dance
- Occupation: Singer
- Years active: 2001–present
- Website: yasmin-k.de

Yasmin Knoch known professionally as Yasmin K. and also using the name Y-ass, is a German pop singer. She is best known for appearing in 2001 on the second season of Popstars.

== Life and career ==
Born in Soufrière, Saint Lucia, Knoch is the daughter of Oliver Bendt, founder of Goombay Dance Band. Her mother is from the Caribbean island of Saint Lucia. Knoch grew up in Hamburg. Her father included her in his stage shows as early as 1980. After completing her Abitur, she took lessons in singing, piano and guitar. She began performing in shows with her father's band. In 2000, she played a major role in the musical Buddy.

In the autumn of 2001, she auditioned for the television show Popstars. Knoch did not make it into the finals and was eliminated from the show. Alex Christensen, a judge on Popstars began collaborating with her on numerous projects. In the summer of 2002, they released the single "Rhythm of the Night", a cover version of a hit by the Italian band Corona.

In 2003, Yasmin K. and Alex Christensen released the song "Angel of Darkness" as a promotion single for Eidos Interactive for the video game Tomb Raider: The Angel of Darkness.

After a four-year break, she reappeared with the song "Du hast den schönsten Arsch der Welt" ("You have the sweetest ass in the world") and a cover version of the 1996 hit "Run Away" by The Soundlovers.

== Discography ==
=== Albums ===
Year	Title	Chart position		
Year	Title	DE	AT	CH
2008	Euphorie (Alex C. feat. Y-ass)	20	19	−

=== Singles ===
Year	Title	Chart position					
Year	Title	DE	AT	CH	BE	SE	NL
2002	"Rhythm of the Night" (Alex C. feat. Yasmin K.)	28	28	81	−	−	−
2002	"Amigos Forever" (Alex C. feat. Yasmin K.)	35	−	86	−	−	−
2003	"Angel of Darkness" (Alex C. feat. Yasmin K.)	21	39	−	−	−	−
2007	"Du hast den schönsten Arsch der Welt" (Alex C. feat. Y-ass)	1	1	50	27	57	38
2008	"Doktorspiele" (Alex C. feat. Y-ass)	4	3	−	−	−	−
2008	"Du bist so porno" (Alex C. feat. Y-ass)	21	12	−	−	−	−
2008	"Liebe zu dritt" (Alex C. feat. Y-ass)	29	28	−	−	−	−
2009	"Dancing Is Like Heaven" (Alex C. feat. Y-ass)	41	41	−	−	−	−
2018	"No Limit"	−	−	−	−	−	−
2019	"Prio" (Nico Suave, Yass)	−	−	−	−	−	−
2019	"High as Fuck" (Nico Suave, Yass)	−	−	−	−	−	−
2020	"Rhythm of the Night" (Felguk, KVSH, Yass)	−	−	−	−	−	−
2021	"My Love Is Your Love" (Kai Schwarz, CAYUS, Yass)	−	−	−	−	−	−
2021	"Time After Time"	−	−	−	−	−	−
