= Now or Never (Mark Medlock song) =

"Now Or Never"

Single by Mark Medlock

from the album Mr. Lonely
- Released: 11 May 2007
- Length: 3:14
- Label: 19; Columbia; Sony BMG
- Songwriter: Dieter Bohlen
- Producer: Dieter Bohlen

Mark Medlock singles chronology
"Now or Never" (2007)	"You Can Get It" (2007)

"Now or Never" is a song by German recording artist Mark Medlock, the winner of the fourth season of the reality television talent show Deutschland sucht den Superstar, broadcast on RTL in 2007. Serving as both his coronation song and debut single, the song was written and produced by DSDS judge Dieter Bohlen. Released in May 2007, it reached the top of the singles charts in Austria, Germany, and Switzerland and was later included on Medlock's debut album Mr. Lonely, released in June 2007.

== Track listing ==
All tracks written and produced by Dieter Bohlen; co-produced by Joachim "Jeo" Mezei.

2-Track single
No.	Title	Length
1.	"Now or Never" (single version)	3:14
2.	"Only a Fool"	3:23

Maxi single
No.	Title	Length
1.	"Now or Never" (single version)	3:14
2.	"Now or Never" (acoustic version)	3:12
3.	"Now or Never" (instrumental version)	3:13
4.	"Only a Fool"	3:23

== Charts ==
=== Weekly charts ===
Weekly chart performance for "Now or Never"
Chart (2007)	Peak position
Austria (Ö3 Austria Top 40)	1
Germany (GfK)	1
Switzerland (Schweizer Hitparade)	1

=== Year-end charts ===
Year-end chart performance for "Now or Never"
Chart (2007)	Position
Austria (Ö3 Austria Top 40)	14
Germany (GfK)	7
Switzerland (Schweizer Hitparade)	25

== Certifications ==
Certifications for "Now or Never"
Region	Certification	Certified units/sales
Austria (IFPI Austria)	Gold	15,000^{*}
Germany (BVMI)	Platinum	300,000^{^}
^{*} Sales figures based on certification alone.^{^} Shipments figures based on certification alone.
