= Alex Christensen =

German composer, producer, and DJ (born 1967)

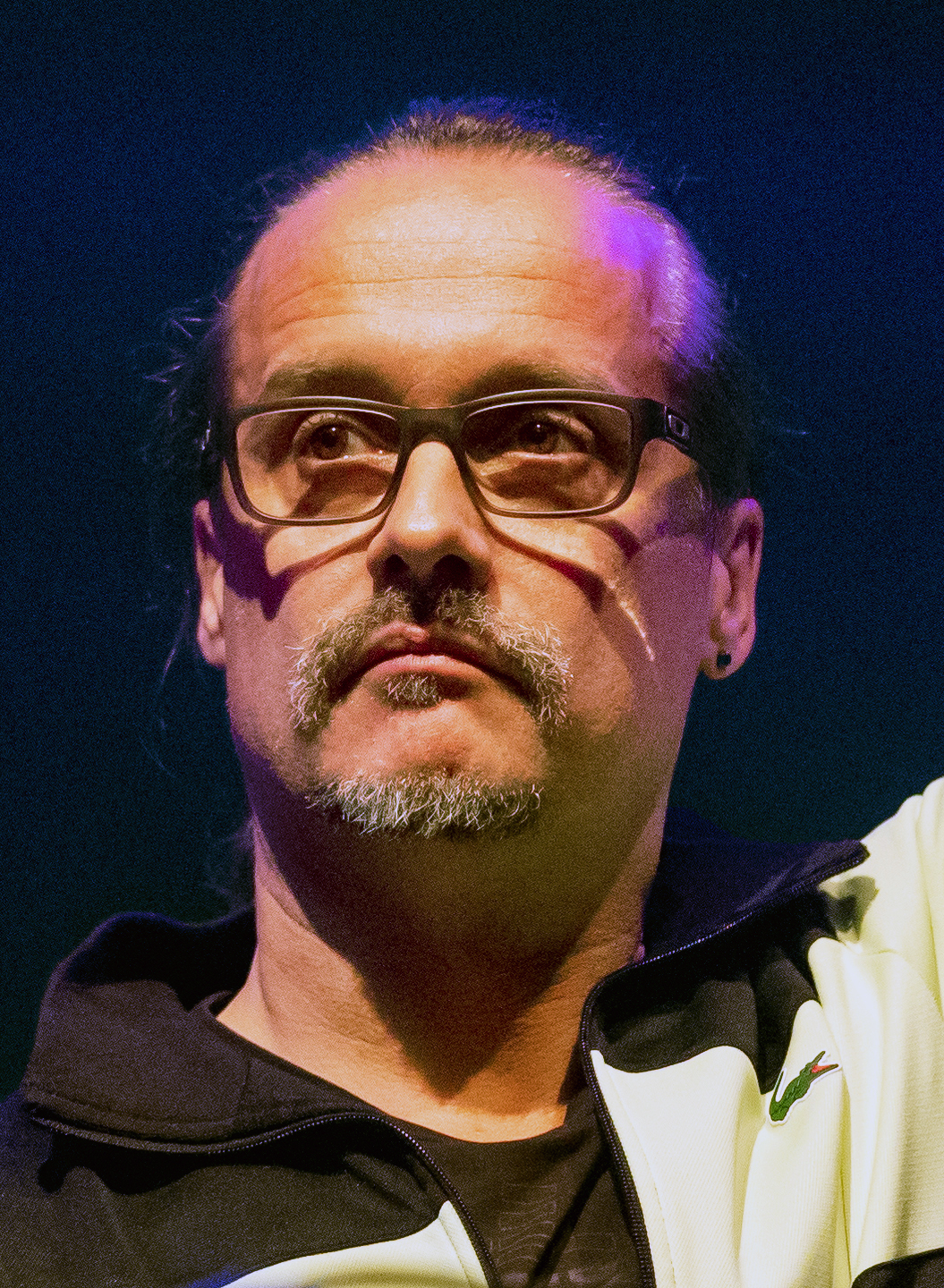
- Christensen in 2017

Background information
- Born: 7 April 1967 (age 59); Germany
- Origin: Wilhelmsburg, Hamburg, Germany
- Genres: Electronic; techno; Eurodance; house
- Occupations: Music producer; DJ; songwriter; session musician
- Instruments: Turntables; keyboards; vocals
- Years active: 1991–present
- Formerly of: U96
- Spouse: Nicole Safft
- Website: alexchristensen.net

Alex Christensen (born 7 April 1967), also known by his stage names Jasper Forks or Alex C., is a German dance music producer, songwriter, and DJ generally known as the face and one of the founding members of U96. Since 2002, he has been collaborating with Yasmin K.

== Music career ==
Christensen started in 1991 as a music producer and DJ, and had his first success in 1991 with the U96 single "Das Boot". In several countries, this track was the first techno song to reach the number one position. Since 2002, Christensen also works under the name Alex C. and frequently collaborates with Yasmin K., whom he met as a judge on the second season of Popstars.

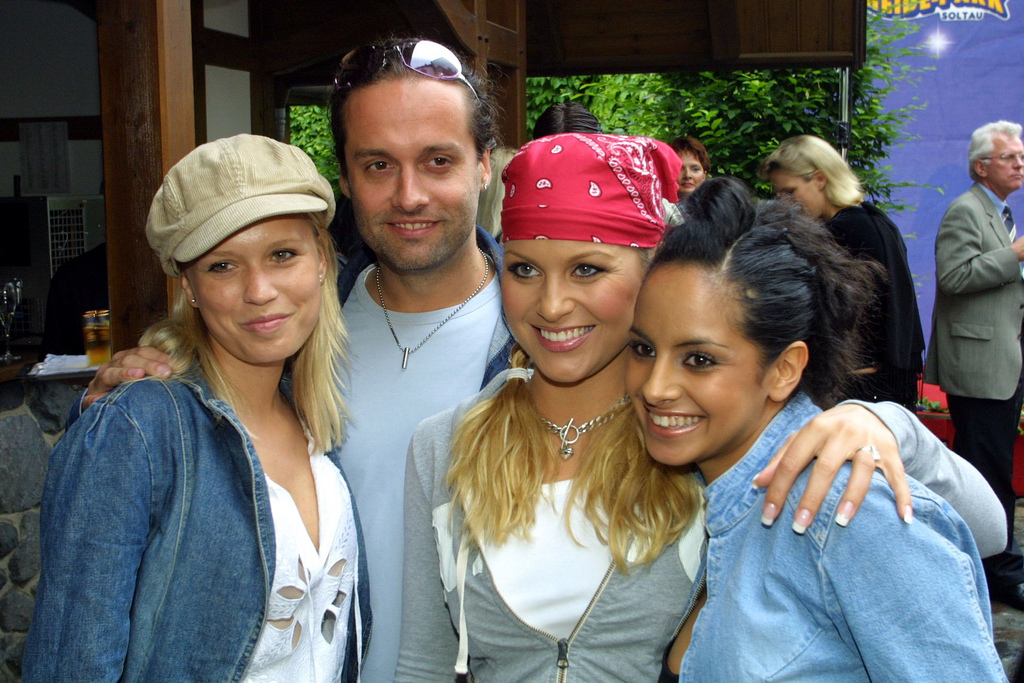
Christensen in 2002

As a producer and composer, Christensen has worked for artists such as Right Said Fred, Marky Mark, Tom Jones, *NSYNC, Rollergirl, Marianne Rosenberg, Sarah Brightman, and ATC.

Christensen represented Germany in the final of the 2009 Eurovision Song Contest in Moscow, together with Oscar Loya, under the name Alex Swings Oscar Sings, performing the song "Miss Kiss Kiss Bang", finishing in 20th place.

Christensen's song "Doktorspiele", which included additional vocals by Y-ass, won the 2008 Eurodanceweb Contest, determined by points assigned by a professional jury of disc jockeys, journalists, music producers, webmasters, and radio speakers from all over the world.

One of the songs produced by Christensen, ATC's "Around the World (La La La La La)", was later sampled in Beat Ink's "Around the World" in 2008 and used in Chris Webby's "La La La" in 2009.

In 2007, Christensen released the song "Du hast den schönsten Arsch der Welt" in co-operation with Y-ass. It sampled The Soundlovers' "Run Away". This song marked an international breakthrough for Christensen and it was re-released in several other languages. In some countries, the melody was adjusted to local preferences.

=== Jasper Forks (2010–present) ===
In early 2010, Christensen adopted the name Jasper Forks to mark a move away from the dance productions he had previously been associated with. He began producing tech piano house, and his first single, "River Flows in You", made it to the top 10 of the airplay charts all across Europe. The track is composed by Korean pianist Yiruma. His follow-up single, "Alone", was released in January 2011. In 2013, he released "J'aime Le Diable".

== Personal life ==
Christensen is married to Nicole Safft. Their son is professional golfer Tiger Christensen.

== Discography ==
=== Studio albums ===
| Title | Details | Peak chart positions | | |
| Title | Details | GER | AUT | SWI |
|---|---|---|---|---|
| Euphorie (feat Y-ass) | Release date: 8 February 2008; Label: Polydor; Formats: CD | 20 | 19 | — |
| Heart 4 Sale! (as Alex Swings Oscar Sings!) | Release date: 2009; Label: 313 Music; Formats: CD | — | — | — |
| Classical '90s Dance (Alex Christensen & the Berlin Orchestra) | Release date: 6 October 2017; Label: Starwatch, Warner; Formats: CD, 2×LP, digital | 10 | 30 | 58 |
| Classical '90s Dance 2 (Alex Christensen & The Berlin Orchestra) | Release date: 19 October 2018; Label: Starwatch, Warner; Formats: CD, 2×LP, digital | 4 | 39 | 58 |
| Classical '90s Dance 3 (Alex Christensen & The Berlin Orchestra) | Release date: 1 November 2019; Label: Starwatch, Warner; Formats: CD, 2×LP, digital | 15 | 59 | — |
| Classical '80s Dance (Alex Christensen & The Berlin Orchestra) | Release date: September 2021; Label: Seven.One Starwatch, Universal; Formats: CD, 2×LP, digital | 6 | 35 | 43 |
| Classical '90s Dance: The Icons (Alex Christensen & The Berlin Orchestra) | Release date: 6 October 2023; Label: Starwatch, Universal; Formats: CD, 2×LP, digital | 6 | — | — |
| Classic Dance: Simply the Best (Alex Christensen & the Berlin Orchestra) | Release date: 17 October 2025; Label: Kingsize, Universal; Formats: CD, digital | 35 | — | — |
"—" denotes releases that did not chart.

=== Charted singles as Alex C. ===
| Year | Single | Peak chart positions | | | | | | Certification | Album |
| Year | Single | GER | AUT | BEL | NED | SWE | SWI | Certification | Album |
|---|---|---|---|---|---|---|---|---|---|
As Alex C.
| 2002 | "Rhythm of the Night" (featuring Yasmin K.) | 28 | 28 | — | — | — | 81 | | Non-album singles |
| 2002 | "Amigos Forever" (featuring Yasmin K.) | 35 | — | — | — | — | 86 | | Non-album singles |
| 2003 | "Angel of Darkness" (featuring Yasmin K.) | 21 | 39 | — | — | — | — | | Non-album singles |
| 2007 | "Du hast den schönsten Arsch der Welt"/ "Sweetest Ass in the World" (featuring Yass) | 1 | 1 | 27 | 38 | 57 | 50 | BVMI: Gold | Euphorie |
| 2008 | "Doktorspiele" (featuring Yass) | 4 | 3 | — | — | — | — | | Euphorie |
| 2008 | "Du bist so Porno" (featuring Yass) | 21 | 12 | — | — | — | — | | Euphorie |
| 2008 | "Liebe zu dritt" (featuring Yass) | 28 | 29 | — | — | — | — | | Non-album singles |
| 2009 | "Dancing Is Like Heaven" (featuring Yass) | 41 | 41 | — | — | — | — | | Non-album singles |
| 2012 | "L'amour toujours" (featuring Yass vs. Ski) | — | 43 | — | — | — | 40 | | Non-album singles |
| 2013 | "Feed Me Diamonds" (featuring Lisa Rowe) | — | 60 | — | — | — | — | | Non-album singles |
"—" denotes releases that did not chart.

=== Charted singles as Alex Swings Oscar Sings! ===
| Year | Single | Peak chart positions | | | | Album |
| Year | Single | GER | AUT | SWE | UK | Album |
|---|---|---|---|---|---|---|
| 2009 | "Miss Kiss Kiss Bang" | 20 | 71 | 35 | 85 | Heart 4 Sale |
"—" denotes releases that did not chart.

| Preceded by No Angels with Disappear | Germany in the Eurovision Song Contest; 2009 (with Oscar) | Succeeded by Lena with Satellite |
