= Mark Medlock =

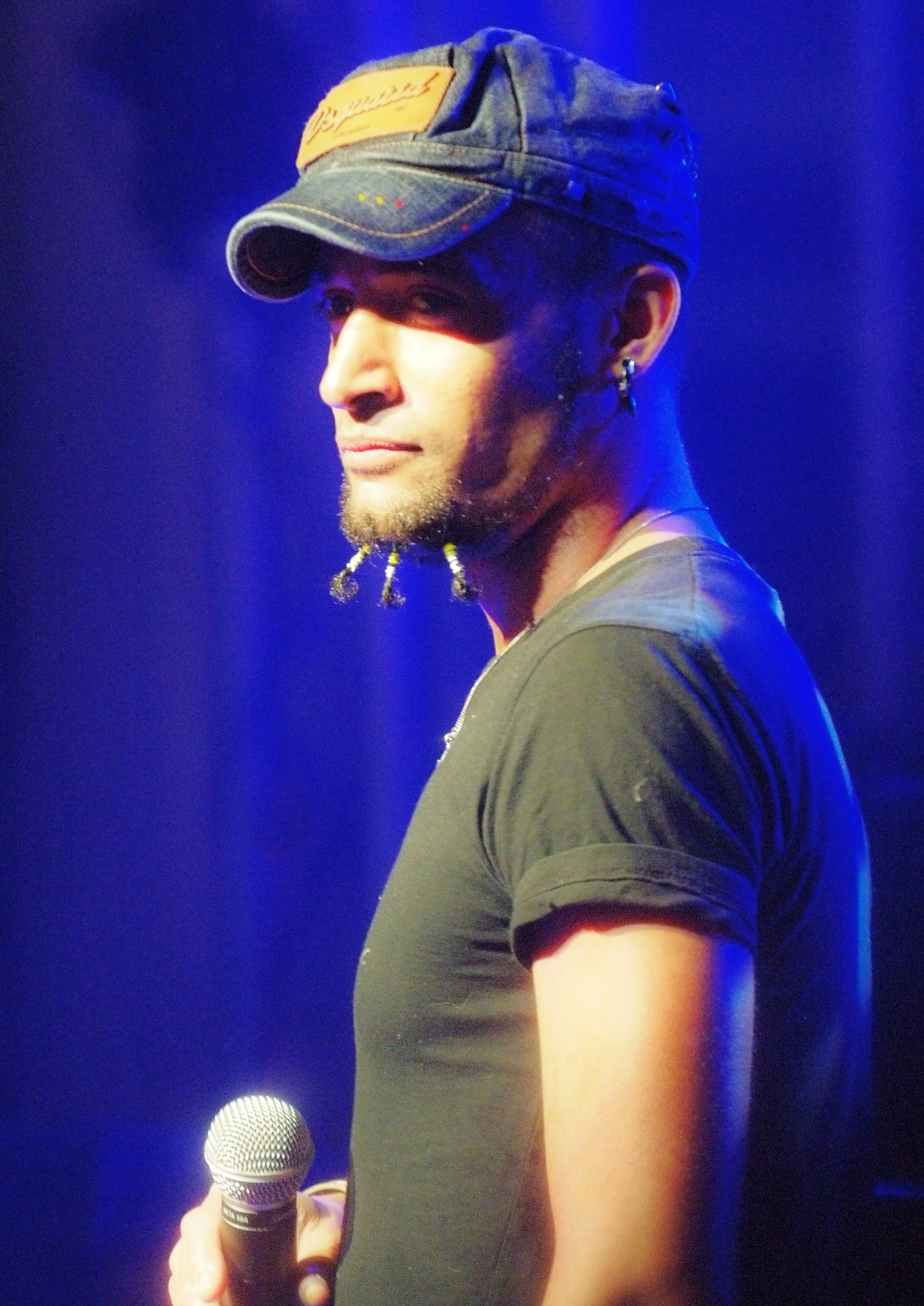
- Medlock in 2009

Background information
- Born: Mark Leon Medlock; 9 July 1978 (age 48); Frankfurt, West Germany
- Origin: Offenbach am Main, Germany
- Genres: Pop, soul, sunshine pop, dance-pop, schlager
- Occupation: Singer
- Years active: 2007–2014
- Label: Sony BMG
- Website: MarkMedlock.de

Mark Leon Medlock (born 9 July 1978) is a German singer and the winner of the season 4 of Deutschland sucht den Superstar (DSDS), the German version of Pop Idol.

== Early life ==
Medlock is the elder of two siblings, born to an African-American father from Georgia, Larry Medlock, and a German mother, Monika, in Frankfurt am Main. Mark and his brother Larry were raised in a semi-poor home in the Lohwaldsiedlung neighborhood of Offenbach am Main during their formative years, before eventually moving to the Lauterborn neighborhood in 1997. At the age of 6, Medlock began singing gospel, widely influenced by his father and soul singers such as James Brown and Barry White.

At the end of the 1990s, his mother fell sick with cancer. Medlock subsequently left school and cared for her until her death in 2000. Two years later, his father died of a heart attack. In the meantime Medlock made a living with various jobs, including employment as a geriatric orderly, gardener, swamper, and garbage remover.

== Deutschland sucht den Superstar ==
Medlock was one of the favorite contestants right from the beginning of the competition. He had wowed the audience and the judges with his first performance in the Top 20 motto show and so on to the final. Medlock eventually won the competition with 78.02% of the votes against Martin Stosch who originally placed fourth but returned because of Max Buskohl's withdrawal.

Medlock is next to season five winner Thomas Godoj the second contestant of all German seasons who always gained the majority of vote calls during any of the nine theme shows and the two Top 20 shows. He is also one of two winners who was revealed to have never been in the bottom three during the competition, as well as being the first multiracial winner.

=== Performances ===
Top-20-Show	Song	Original interpreter	% Result
1. Top-20-Show	"Easy"	Lionel Richie	41,25% (1st place of 9)
2. Top-20-Show	"Ain't No Sunshine"	Bill Withers	33,23% (1st place of 7)

Theme of show	Song	Original interpreter	% Result
Greatest Hits	"Hello"	Lionel Richie	25,85% (1st place in 10)
Hits from the 80s and 90s	"Unchain My Heart"	Joe Cocker	30,77% (1st place in 9)
Power of Love	"Endless Love"	Lionel Richie & Diana Ross	30,43% (1st place in 8)
Hits from today	"You Give Me Something"	James Morrison	31,64% (1st place in 7)
Big Band	"Unforgettable"	Nat King Cole	34,62% (1st place in 6)
The great divas and heroes of music	"I Heard It Through the Grapevine"	Marvin Gaye	36,06% (1st place in 5)
The great divas and heroes of music	"Three Times a Lady"	Lionel Richie	36,06% (1st place in 5)
Hits from the 70s, Disco und Dedicated to …	"You're the First, the Last, My Everything"	Barry White	48,13% (1st place in 4)
Hits from the 70s, Disco und Dedicated to …	"Stand by Me"	Ben E. King	48,13% (1st place in 4)
Songs suggested by jury	"You Can Leave Your Hat On" (duet with Heinz Henn)	Joe Cocker	59,00% (1st place in 3)
Songs suggested by jury	"My Girl" (duet with Anja Lukaseder)	The Temptations	59,00% (1st place in 3)
Songs suggested by jury	"(Sittin' On) The Dock of the Bay" (duet with Dieter Bohlen)	Otis Redding	59,00% (1st place in 3)
Finale	"What a Wonderful World"	Louis Armstrong	78,02% (1st place in 2)
Finale	"Easy"	The Commodores	78,02% (1st place in 2)
Finale	"Now or Never"	Mark Medlock	78,02% (1st place in 2)

== Discography ==
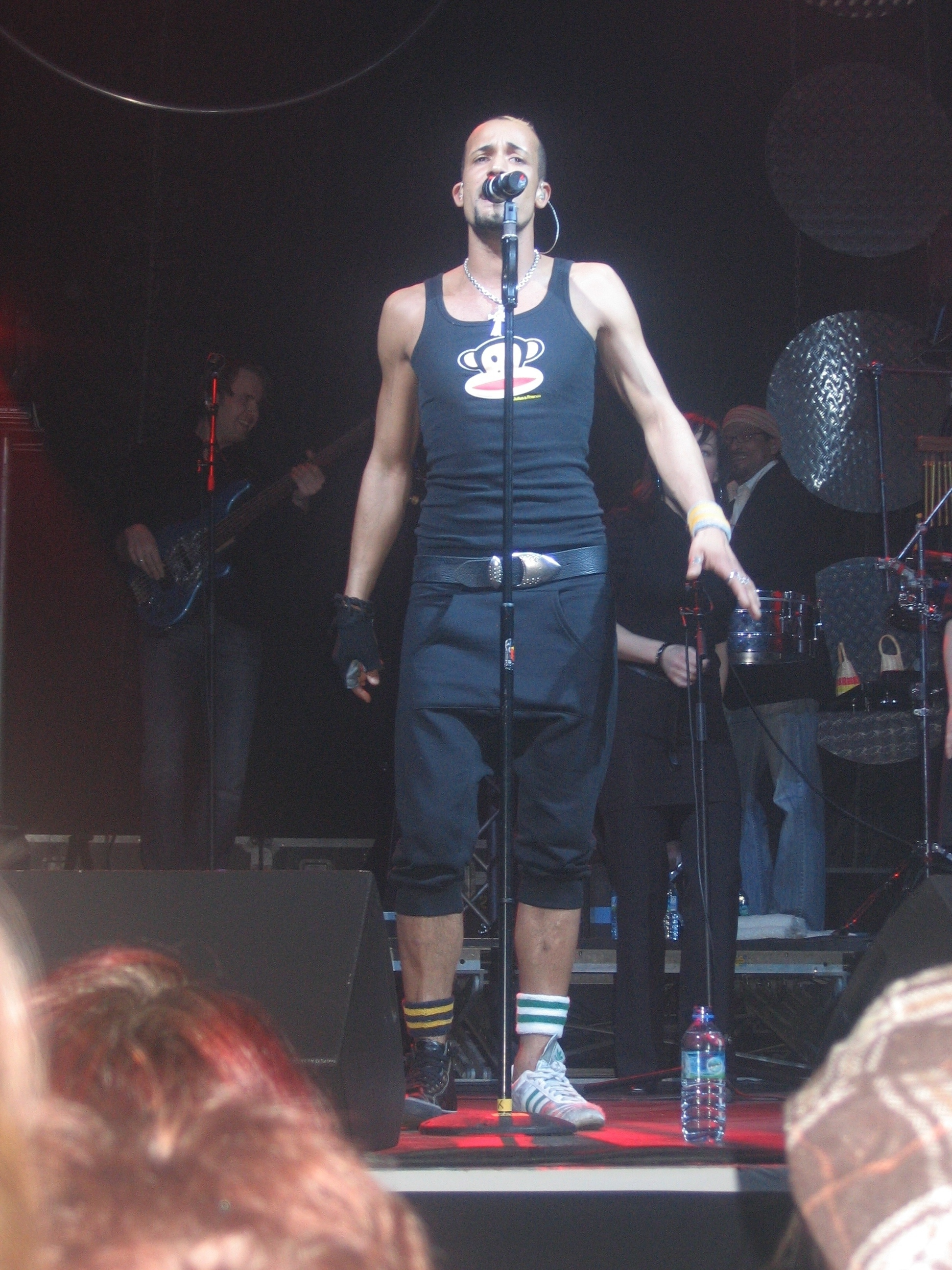
Medlock performing in 2008

- Mr. Lonely (2007)
- Dreamcatcher (joint album with Dieter Bohlen; 2007)
- Cloud Dancer (2008)
- Club Tropicana (2009)
- Rainbow's End (2010)
- My World (2011)
- Im Nebel (2014)
- Zwischenwelten (2017)
- Back into the Sun (2026)

Preceded by Tobias Regner	Deutschland sucht den Superstar; Winner; Season 4 (2007)	Succeeded by Thomas Godoj
