= Hits Unlimited =

Greatest hits album by 2 Unlimited
- Released: 30 October 1995
- Recorded: 1991-1995
- Genre: Eurodance
- Length: 59:44
- Label: PWL

2 Unlimited chronology
Real Things (1994)	Hits Unlimited (1995)	II (1998)

Singles from Hits Unlimited
- 1. "Do What's Good for Me" Released: 2 October 1995; 2. "Jump for Joy" Released: 29 January 1996; 3. "Spread Your Love" Released: 6 June 1996

Professional ratings
Review scores
Source	Rating
AllMusic	4.5/5 stars
Music Week	4/5 stars
NME	5/10
Select	3/5 medals

Hits Unlimited is the fourth album from Dutch/Belgian band 2 Unlimited and the last to feature Ray Slijngaard and Anita Doth. It was a greatest hits package featuring 16 songs: 13 previous singles and 3 new ones. The album, released by PWL, was certified gold in the Netherlands. Ray Slijngaard's raps on the verses were not cut on any of the songs on the UK release of this album.

== Critical reception ==
Music Week wrote, "A storming 16-track collection of pop/rave classics cataloguing the incredible impact Dutch duo Anita and Ray have had since 1991. The inclusion of European versions, with added rap will be a bonus for fans." Stephen Dalton from NME said, "These songs are about clean, controlled fun and strict discipline — 'Jump for Joy', 'Workaholic', 'Let the Beat Control Your Body' — booted along by stormtrooper hardcore beats designed to encourage Eurokids to work hard and use leisure time constructively. [...] This is the sound of robotic consumerism triumphing over everything else — forever. And pretty damn catchy it is, too." He concluded, "Buy this album now and be happy forever."

== Track listing ==
1. "Do What's Good for Me" – 3:49
2. "No Limit" – 3:30 (from No Limits)
3. "Get Ready for This" – 3:42 (from Get Ready!)
4. "Twilight Zone" – 4:10 (from Get Ready!)
5. "No One" – 3:26 (from Real Things)
6. "Jump for Joy" – 3:42
7. "Tribal Dance" – 3:40 (from No Limits)
8. "The Magic Friend" – 3:44 (from Get Ready!)
9. "Workaholic" – 3:33 (from Get Ready!)
10. "Let the Beat Control Your Body" – 3:38 (from No Limits)
11. "Nothing Like the Rain" – 3:59 (from Real Things)
12. "Spread Your Love" – 4:43
13. "The Real Thing" – 3:39 (from Real Things)
14. "Here I Go" – 3:16 (from Real Things)
15. "Maximum Overdrive" – 3:41 (from No Limits)
16. "Faces" – 3:32 (from No Limits)

== Charts ==
Chart performance for Hits Unlimited
Chart (1995)	Peak position
Australian Albums (ARIA)	78
Belgian Albums (Ultratop Flanders)	5
Belgian Albums (Ultratop Wallonia)	24
Dutch Albums (Album Top 100)	4
Finnish Albums (Suomen virallinen lista)	24
French Albums (SNEP)	11
Hungarian Albums (MAHASZ)	39
Japanese Albums (Oricon)	7
New Zealand Albums (RMNZ)	8
Norwegian Albums (VG-lista)	22
UK Albums (Official Charts)	27
US Billboard 200	107

== Certifications ==
Certifications for Hits Unlimited
Region	Certification	Certified units/sales
Belgium (BRMA)	Gold	25,000^{*}
Japan (RIAJ)	Gold	100,000^{^}
^{*} Sales figures based on certification alone.^{^} Shipments figures based on certification alone.
