= Trance Remixes (Special Edition) =

Remix album by 2 Unlimited
- Released: 2002
- Genre: Uplifting Trance, Progressive Trance, Eurodance
- Label: I-Dance
- Producer: Jean-Paul de Coster, Phil Wilde

2 Unlimited chronology
Greatest Hits Remixes (2001)	Trance Remixes (Special Edition) (2002)	Greatest Remix Hits (2006)

Trance Remixes is a 2002 album by 2 Unlimited, a Eurodance project founded in 1991 by Belgian producers Jean-Paul DeCoster and Phil Wilde and fronted by Dutch rapper Ray Slijngaard and Dutch vocalist Anita Doth.

== Album information ==
Trance Remixes contains 16 remixes of 2 Unlimited's greatest hits from studio albums Get Ready!, No Limits and Real Things.

== Release history ==
Trance Remixes was released in December 2002 in Japan.

== Track listing ==
1. No Limit (Moon Project Remix Edit) (3:49)
2. Twilight Zone (PK Hard Trance Radio Edit) (3:18)
3. Tribal Dance (Tribal Trance Mix) (8:03)
4. Maximum Overdrive (KG Hitman Remix) (8:07)
5. Get Ready for This (Yves De Ruyter Edit) (3:16)
6. Let the Beat Control Your Body (Mistral Mix) (7:31)
7. Workaholic (K-Groove Trance Mix) (8:17)
8. The Real Thing (Trance Mix Edit) (4:00)
9. The Magic Friend (Black Joker Trance Mix) (3:46)
10. Maximum Overdrive (Horny Horns Vocal Radio Edit) (3:44)
11. No Limit (Push's Trancendental Remix) (8:06)
12. Twilight Zone (PK Hard Trance Remix) (8:10)
13. Twilight Zone (R-C Extended Club Mix) (7:21)
