= Do What's Good for Me =

1995 single by 2 Unlimited

- One of European cover arts

Single by 2 Unlimited

from the album Hits Unlimited
- Released: 2 October 1995
- Genre: Pop-NRG dance; techno
- Length: 3:49
- Label: Byte; ZYX
- Songwriters: Phil Wilde; Jean-Paul De Coster; Ray Slijngaard; Anita Dels
- Producers: Phil Wilde; Jean-Paul De Coster

2 Unlimited singles chronology
"Nothing Like the Rain" (1995)	"Do What's Good for Me" (1995)	"Jump for Joy" (1996)

Music video
- "Do What's Good For Me" on YouTube

"Do What's Good for Me" is a song by Belgian-Dutch Eurodance band 2 Unlimited, released in October 1995, via Byte and ZYX Records, as the first single from the band's first greatest hits compilation album, Hits Unlimited (1995). Co-written by band members Anita Dels and Ray Slijngaard, with its producers Phil Wilde and Jean-Paul De Coster, the song was a hit in Europe, reaching the top 10 in Finland and Spain. Its music video was directed by Nigel Simpkiss, featuring the duo performing on a website.

== Critical reception ==
Larry Flick from Billboard magazine wrote, "The ongoing wave of pop-NRG dance acts enjoying radio prominence owes a massive debt to this ever-hot European duo for getting the party started. Sadly, the act has yet to achieve U.S. success à la such offspring as Real McCoy, but this jumpy li'l jam could easily change that. The bassline throbs infectiously, while the interplay of male rapping and female singing pops with palpable chemistry." Ross Jones from The Guardian deemed it "a powerhouse anthem of self-discovery, robo-bass, and skipping beats".

A reviewer from Music Week gave the song a score of three out of five, adding that "Anita and Ray go for a harder-edged techno sound, resulting in a less radio-friendly track than many of their recent releases." James Hamilton from the Record Mirror Dance Update named it a "synth stabbed squawker". Siân Pattenden from Smash Hits gave "Do What's God for Me" two out of five, writing, "Blimey. Lots of housey parples and tremendous battling-rat-belching-in-a-bucket-noises, but no chorus! Anita reveals a strong side in expressing her feelings of imprisonment, while Ray interrupts her à la Ray."

== Chart performance ==
"Do What's God for Me" charted in Europe, Australia and West Asia, peaking at number three in Finland and Spain. And it became a top-20 hit in Belgium (in both Flanders and Wallonia), Denmark, the Netherlands and the United Kingdom. In the latter, it peaked at number 16 during its first week at the UK Singles Chart, on 21 October 1995, spending a total of seven weeks within the chart. Additionally, the single was a top-30 hit in Austria and a top-40 hit in Sweden. In Australia, it reached number 87 on the ARIA singles chart. On both the Eurochart Hot 100 and the European Dance Radio Chart, "Do What's Good for Me" peaked at number 13 during November 1995. In West Asia, the song became a top-30 hit in Israel, peaking at number 26 on 28 November.

== Music video ==
The accompanying music video for "Do What's Good For Me" was directed by director Nigel Simpkiss for Swivel Films and filmed in 101 Studios in London. John Pardue was responsible for the camera. The video features Anita and Ray performing the song inside a computer, on what appears to be a website. It was released in the UK in October 1995 and A-listed on Dutch music television channel TMF in November 1995. Simpkiss had previously directed the videos for "Let the Beat Control Your Body", "The Real Thing", "Here I Go" and "Nothing Like the Rain".

== Track listings ==
- Canadian CD maxi
1. "Do What's Good for Me" (Edit) (3:55)
2. "Do What's Good for Me" (Extended) (6:05)
3. "Do What's Good for Me" (Alex Party Remix) (5:08)
4. "Do What's Good for Me" (X-Out Remix) (5:25)
5. "Do What's Good for Me" (Aural Pleasure Mix) (9:00)
6. "Club Megamix" (9:34)
- European and Japanese CD maxi
1. "Do What's Good for Me" (Edit) (3:49)
2. "Do What's Good for Me" (Extended) (6:03)
3. "Do What's Good for Me" (Alex Party Remix) (5:06)
4. "Do What's Good for Me" (X-Out Remix) (5:22)
5. "Do What's Good for Me" (Aural Pleasure Mix) (8:58)
6. "Club Megamix" (9:34)
- UK CD single 1
1. "Do What's Good for Me" (Radio Edit) (3:11)
2. "Do What's Good for Me" (Extended) (6:03)
3. "Do What's Good for Me" (X-Out Remix) (5:22)
4. "Do What's Good for Me" (Alex Party Remix) (5:06)
5. "Do What's Good for Me" (Aural Pleasure Mix) (8:58)
- UK CD single 2
1. "Do What's Good for Me" (Radio Edit) (3:11)
2. "2U Megamix" (6:04)
3. "Club Megamix" (9:34)
- US CD maxi
1. "Do What's Good for Me" (Edit) (3:49)
2. "Do What's Good for Me" (Extended) (6:03)
3. "Do What's Good for Me" (Alex Party Remix) (5:06)
4. "Do What's Good for Me" (X-Out Remix) (5:22)
5. "Do What's Good for Me" (Aural Pleasure Mix) (8:58)
- 7-inch single
1. "Do What's Good for Me" (Edit) (3:49)
2. "Do What's Good for Me" (Alex Party Remix) (3:50)
- Belgian 12-inch maxi
1. "Do What's Good for Me" (Alex Party Remix) (5:06)
2. "Do What's Good for Me" (X-Out Remix) (5:22)
3. "Do What's Good for Me" (Aural Pleasure Mix) (8:58)
4. "Do What's Good for Me" (Extended) (6:03)
- Italian 12-inch maxi
1. "Do What's Good for Me" (Extended) (6:03)
2. "Do What's Good for Me" (Edit) (3:49)
3. "Club Megamix" (9:34)
4. "Do What's Good for Me" (Alex Party Remix) (5:06)
5. "Do What's Good for Me" (X-Out Remix) (5:22)
6. "Do What's Good for Me" (Aural Pleasure Mix) (8:58)
- US 12-inch maxi
1. "Do What's Good for Me" (Extended) (6:03)
2. "Do What's Good for Me" (Alex Party Remix) (5:06)
3. "Do What's Good for Me" (X-Out Remix) (5:22)
4. "Do What's Good for Me" (Aural Pleasure Mix) (8:58)

== Charts ==
=== Weekly charts ===
Chart (1995)	Peak position
Australia (ARIA)	87
Austria (Ö3 Austria Top 40)	29
Belgium (Ultratop 50 Flanders)	14
Belgium (Ultratop 50 Wallonia)	14
Denmark (IFPI)	20
Europe (Eurochart Hot 100)	13
Europe (European Dance Radio)	13
Finland (Suomen virallinen lista)	3
Germany (GfK)	50
Israel (Israeli Singles Chart)	26
Netherlands (Dutch Top 40)	13
Netherlands (Single Top 100)	14
Scottish Singles Sales (Official Charts)	24
Spain (AFYVE)	3
Sweden (Sverigetopplistan)	35
Switzerland (Schweizer Hitparade)	41
UK Singles (Official Charts)	16

=== Year-end charts ===
Chart (1995)	Position
Belgium (Ultratop Flanders)	84
Belgium (Ultratop Wallonia)	79
Latvia (Latvijas Top 50)	180
Netherlands (Dutch Top 40)	119

== Release history ==
Region	Date	Format(s)	Label(s)	Ref.
Europe	2 October 1995	CD	Byte; ZYX	
United Kingdom	9 October 1995	CD; cassette	PWL International	
Japan	10 November 1995	CD	Mercury	
Australia	20 November 1995	CD; cassette	Liberation	
United States	27 February 1996	Rhythmic contemporary radio	Radikal	
United States	5 March 1996	Contemporary hit radio	Radikal	

== Kids Like You and Me ==
"Kids Like You and Me"

Single by 2 Unlimited
- Released: 1995
- Label: Byte
- Songwriters: Phil Wilde; Jean-Paul De Coster; Ray Slijngaard; Anita Dels

In the Netherlands, a re-recorded version of this track entitled "Kids Like You and Me" was released in order to promote awareness of homeless youth. The music remained the same while new lyrics were composed incorporating the messages of homeless youth. It was not released in the United Kingdom.

=== Track listing ===
- CD single
1. "Kids Like You and Me" (radio edit) (3:49)
2. "Kids Like You and Me" (instrumental) (3:49)
