= Ray & Anita =

Dutch electronic music duo

- Origin: Amsterdam, Netherlands
- Genres: Electro; big room house; EDM
- Years active: 2009–2012
- Spinoff of: 2 Unlimited
- Past members: Ray Slijngaard; Anita Doth

Ray & Anita was a Dutch electronic music duo act formed in 2009, comprising rapper Ray Slijngaard and singer Anita Doth, who previously were the voices and faces from eurodance group 2 Unlimited. Originally created by Belgian producers Jean-Paul DeCoster and Phil Wilde, these two still held legal rights to the '2 Unlimited' name. Under that name, the Dutch duo fronting the Belgian / Dutch quartet scored 16 chart hits between 1991 and 1996, including "Get Ready for This", "Twilight Zone", "No Limit", "Tribal Dance", "Maximum Overdrive" and "The Real Thing".

On April 11, 2009, Slijngaard and Doth reunited to perform together for the first time in 13 years at the I Love the 90's concert in Hasselt, Belgium. Further gigs followed on April 30 at the Radio 538 Queen's Day concert at Museumplein in Amsterdam, and as support act for Milk Inc at the Sportpaleis in Antwerp on September 25.

Following months of speculation, it was confirmed on December 29 that the duo would release a new single together in 2010 called "In Da Name Of Love" as "Ray & Anita". Jean-Paul DeCoster is thought to have denied permission for them to use the name "2 Unlimited", as he still owns the rights to the brand.

The single "In Da Name Of Love" debuted on the final Tipparade chart of 2009 at number 28. It reached number 1 at the Dutch Dance Top 30 and number 3 at the Belgium Dance Top 30. It also made top 5 in the mainstream Dutch 100 singles.

On January 5, 2010, the world premiere of the new single was broadcast on Radio 538, accompanied by an exclusive interview with Ray. The premiere was uploaded to YouTube by their label Spinnin' Records which released the first single. The artist management made YouTube take down any video of the song that had been mislabeled as 2 Unlimited. On January 8, 2010, iTunes officially released the new single on the Dutch site only. It contains the Radio Edit & Extended mixes only. "In Da Name Of Love" CD single was released officially on 22 January. An international release is expected. The video clip was released on January 30.

Phil Wilde had given his approval for Ray & Anita to release "In Da Name Of Love" as "2 Unlimited", but they were unable to acquire the rights to the name. This can be heard in the lyrics of the song. In the first few lines Ray says "..still Unlimited, you're so limited..", possibly directed at Jean-Paul De Coster. RTL Boulevard also announced that Anita has breast cancer. According to Ray, she discovered the disease in an early stage.

On 30 April 2010, they performed "Still Unlimited" at the Queen's Day concert in Amsterdam, originally slated as the follow-up single. On 4 September 2010, Ray & Anita performed another new track called "Retro Future" at Slam!FM Beach Break Party.

The second single under the guise of Ray & Anita titled "Nothing 2 Lose" was finally announced through Ape Magazine on 14 November 2010, and was performed live at the "We Love The 90's" concert at the end of 2010. American DJ and Producer Chew Fu announced soon after that he was working on a remix for Ray & Anita. A Sneak preview of the "Chew Fu Unlimited Fix" premiered on radio on 26 June 2011 to tease fans.

In mid July, Ray & Anita invited fans to join them in the recording of the video for "Nothing 2 Lose" in Amsterdam. Fans applied through email and were selected randomly. The video with the fans was shot on 28 July, which was Part 1 of the video shoot. Part 2 was shot the next day without the fans. The single is slated for release by the end of August 2011. The single is also the lead track for the film soundtrack of Amsterdam Heavy.

In an interview with the Dutch site NLpop Blog Ray announced that they are working on a new album with dance and urban influences and that they are also working on a world tour. None of this transpired apart from the odd concert here and there, usually gigs celebrating 1990s music.

In July 2012, Ray and Anita announced through their Facebook pages that they were to be working under the name 2 Unlimited once again after reconciling with the owner of the bandname Jean Paul DeCoster. Their official website 2unlimitedlive.com was also launched.

== Singles ==
=== As lead artist ===
| Year | Single | Chart Position | | | Album |
| Year | Single | NET^{Single T100} | NET^{Dutch T40} | BE^{Ultratop 50} | Album |
|---|---|---|---|---|---|
| 2010 | "In da Name of Love" | 4 | 6 | 26 | Non-album singles |
| 2011 | "Nothing 2 Lose" | — | — | — | Non-album singles |
