= In da Name of Love =

Single by Ray & Anita
- Released: January 8th, 2010 (Download) January 22nd, 2010 (CD)
- Recorded: 2009
- Genre: Dance
- Length: 3:17
- Label: Spinnin' Records
- Songwriter(s): Ray Slijngaard; Anita Doth; Robin Morssink; Jan van der Toorn

Ray & Anita singles chronology
"In da Name of Love" (2010)	"Nothing 2 Lose" (2011)

"In da Name of Love" is a dance song released and written by Ray Slijngaard, Anita Doth, Robin Morssink & Jan van der Toorn. It is their first song released under the name Ray & Anita, the duo having previously most famously been the vocalists for the eurodance band 2 Unlimited. It premiered on Radio 538 on 5 January 2010, and was officially released on iTunes Holland Store on 8 January. On their YouTube page, Spinnin' Records announced that the full release on CD single would be available on January 22.

On January 11, 2010, the teaser to the videoclip premiered on the Dutch TV show RTL Boulevard, and YouTube. Their label (Spinnin' Records) also announced that the videoclip would premier on Saturday, January 30. The videoclip can be watched online at YouTube.

Ray & Anita announced that they would be releasing "In Da Name Of Love" worldwide on April 7, 2010. However, the release was cancelled due to Anita's health problems.

== Track listing ==
Digital Download (iTunes)

1. "In Da Name Of Love (Radio Edit)" (3:17)
2. "In Da Name Of Love (Extended)" (5:00)

(Dance-Tunes.com Exclusive)

1. "In Da Name Of Love (R3hab Mix)" (5:24)
2. "In Da Name Of Love (Addy Van Der Zwan & R3hab Mix)" (6:28)
3. "In Da Name Of Love (Mark Simmons remix)" (6:40)
4. "In Da Name Of Love (Mark Simmons Dub)" (6:27)

== Exclusive Remixes ==
Digital Download (iTunes Australia)

1. "In Da Name Of Love (Hardforze Remix)" (6:47)

Released July 17, 2010 on iTunes Australia. Also found on mixed 3-CD dance compilation Electro Clubland Vol. 1 (exclusive to Australia too).

== Release history ==
Region	Date	Label	Format
Netherlands	January 8, 2010	Spinnin' Records	Digital download
Netherlands	January 22, 2010	Spinnin' Records	CD single

== Charts ==
=== Weekly charts ===
Chart (2010)	Peak position
Belgium (Ultratop 50 Flanders)	26
Netherlands (Dutch Top 40)	6
Netherlands (Single Top 100)	4

=== Year-end charts ===
Chart (2010)	Position
Netherlands (Dutch Top 40)	94
Netherlands (Single Top 100)	96
