= Here I Go (2 Unlimited song) =

1995 single by 2 Unlimited

- Artwork for continental European and some non-European territorial releases

Single by 2 Unlimited

from the album Real Things
- Released: 6 March 1995
- Genre: Hi-NRG; rave; techno
- Length: 5:10; 3:16 (single version)
- Label: Byte
- Songwriters: Phil Wilde; Jean-Paul De Coster; Ray Slijngaard; Anita Dels
- Producers: Phil Wilde; Jean-Paul De Coster

2 Unlimited singles chronology
"No One" (1994)	"Here I Go" (1995)	"Nothing Like the Rain" (1995)

Music video
- "Here I Go" on YouTube

"Here I Go" is a song by Belgian/Dutch Eurodance group 2 Unlimited. It was co-written by band members Ray Slijngaard and Anita Doth and was released in March 1995 as the third single from their third album, Real Things (1994). In the United States, the song was released as a double A-side single with 2 Unlimited's next European single, "Nothing Like the Rain". "Here I Go" became a top-10 hit in at least six countries: Belgium, Finland, Israel, Lithuania, the Netherlands, and Spain. Its accompanying black-and-white music video was directed by Nigel Simpkiss and filmed in London, featuring 2 Unlimited performing in a parking garage with performance artists on stilts.

== Chart performance ==
"Here I Go" enjoyed moderate success in Europe, becoming a top-10 hit in Finland (6), Flanders (6), Lithuania, the Netherlands (4), and Spain (7). It additionally was a top-20 hit in Austria (17), Denmark (17), Sweden (20) and Wallonia (12), and a top-30 hit in France (25), Germany (22), and the United Kingdom, as well as the Eurochart Hot 100, where it peaked at number 29 in April 1995. In the UK, "Here I Go" was the least successful single release by the band at the time, reaching number 22 during its first week on the UK Singles Chart, on 19 March 1995. On the UK Dance Chart, it reached number 23. Outside Europe, the song charted in Australia and Canada, where it peaked at numbers 80 and 22, respectively. In West Asia, it became a top-10 hit in Israel, peaking at number eight in its second week on the chart, on 4 April 1995.

== Critical reception ==
Larry Flick from Billboard magazine wrote, "One of the first act's to merge hi-NRG bounce with rave aggression may finally have the single that sends 'em all the way to the top of the pops. Male rapping and female vamping collide and happily coexist inside a storm of syncopated beats and blippy synth passages." Gil Robertson IV from Cash Box said, "Rap/hip-hop meets techno-dance on this single, which should do well on both rap and dance formats. The music here is thumping, pumping, and more, which should certainly get everyone partying on the dance floor."

Caroline Sullivan from The Guardian complimented "a slightly pensive lyric" on the "percussive" track. A reviewer from Music Week felt that it "stays in familiar Euro techno territory", adding that "a mix from Alex Party should help it follow the previous 11 into the Top 20." In a retrospective review, Pop Rescue described "Here I Go" as "a belter of a track". James Hamilton from the Record Mirror Dance Update named it "unexpectedly terrific". Pete Stanton from Smash Hits gave the song one out of five, saying, "It's another album track, slightly remixed, but, er, still the same." He noted that it "boasts a pumping beat".

== Music video ==
The music video for "Here I Go" was far more arty and modern than previous videos, being shot in black-and-white with 2 Unlimited performing in a darkly lit parking garage featuring performance artists on stilts. In some scenes, the dancers appear falling into a large constructed spiderweb made of ropes. Band members Ray Slijngaard and Anita Doth walks around the garage with a dog by their side. The video was directed by director Nigel Simpkiss for Swivel Films and filmed in Clink Prison Museum in London, and was released in the UK in March 1995. Simpkiss had previously directed the music videos for the group's hit-singles "Let the Beat Control Your Body" and "The Real Thing". "Here I Go" is also the only video by the group to be shot in black-and-white. It was B-listed on French music television channel MCM in the beginning of April 1995 and B-listed on Germany's VIVA two weeks later.

== Track listings ==
- European and Australian CD maxi
1. "Here I Go" (Radio Edit) (3:16)
2. "Here I Go" (X-Out Edit) (3:30)
3. "Here I Go" (Dub Down Below) (7:26)
4. "Here I Go" (X-Out In Dub) (5:29)
5. "Here I Go" (Alex Party Remix) (4:40)
- UK CD single
1. "Here I Go" (Radio Edit)
2. "Here I Go" (Alex Party Remix)
3. "Here I Go" (X-Out In Club)
4. "Here I Go" (Dub Down Below)
- Italian CD single
1. "Here I Go" (X-Out Edit) (3:20)
2. "Here I Go" (Dub Down Below) (3:33)
3. "Here I Go" (Album Version) (7:29)
4. "Here I Go" (X-Out In Club) (5:33)
5. "Here I Go" (Alex Party Remix) (4:45)
- US CD single
1. "Here I Go" (Radio Edit) (3:16)
2. "Here I Go" (Album Version) (5:13)
3. "Here I Go" (X-Out Edit) (3:30)
- 7-inch single
1. "Here I Go" (Radio Edit) (3:16)
2. "Here I Go" (X-Out Edit) (3:30)
- Belgian 12-inch maxi
1. "Here I Go" (X-Out Edit) (3:30)
2. "Here I Go" (Dub Down Below) (7:26)
3. "Here I Go" (Album Version) (5:12)
4. "Here I Go" (X-Out In Club) (5:29)
5. "Here I Go" (Alex Party Remix) (4:40)
- UK 12-inch maxi
1. "Here I Go" (X-Out In Club) (5:29)
2. "Here I Go" (Album Version) (5:12)
3. "Here I Go" (Alex Party Remix) (4:40)
4. "Here I Go" (Dub Down Below) (7:26)
- German and Italian 12-inch maxi
1. "Here I Go" (X-Out Edit) (3:30)
2. "Here I Go" (Dub Down Below) (7:26)
3. "Here I Go" (Album Version) (5:12)
4. "Here I Go" (X-Out In Club) (5:29)
5. "Here I Go" (Alex Party Remix) (4:40)
- French 12-inch maxi
1. "Here I Go" (X-Out In Club) (5:29)
2. "Here I Go" (Album Version) (5:12)
3. "Here I Go" (Alex Party Remix) (4:40)
4. "Here I Go" (X-Out Edit) (3:30)
- Spanish 12" maxi
1. "Here I Go" (X-Out In Club) (5:29)
2. "Here I Go" (X-Out Edit) (3:30)
3. "Here I Go" (Alex Party Remix) (4:40)
4. "Here I Go" (Dub Down Below) (7:26)

== Charts ==
=== Weekly charts ===
Chart (1995)	Peak position
Australia (ARIA)	80
Austria (Ö3 Austria Top 40)	17
Belgium (Ultratop 50 Flanders)	6
Belgium (Ultratop 50 Wallonia)	12
Denmark (IFPI)	17
Europe (Eurochart Hot 100)	29
Europe (European Dance Radio)	12
Europe (European Hit Radio)	38
Finland (Suomen virallinen lista)	6
France (SNEP)	25
Germany (GfK)	22
Israel (Israeli Singles Chart)	8
Lithuania (M-1)	7
Netherlands (Dutch Top 40)	5
Netherlands (Single Top 100)	4
Scotland (OCC)	21
Spain (AFYVE)	7
Sweden (Sverigetopplistan)	20
Switzerland (Schweizer Hitparade)	38
UK Singles (OCC)	22
UK Dance (OCC)	23
UK Pop Tip Club Chart (Music Week)	19

=== Year-end charts ===
Chart (1995)	Position
Belgium (Ultratop 50 Wallonia)	54
Netherlands (Dutch Top 40)	92
Netherlands (Single Top 100)	92

== Release history ==
Region	Date	Format(s)	Label(s)	Ref.
Germany	6 March 1995	CD	ZYX	
United Kingdom	13 March 1995	7-inch vinyl; 12-inch vinyl; CD; cassette	PWL Continental	
Australia	3 April 1995	CD; cassette	Liberation; Byte	
Japan	26 April 1995	CD	Mercury	
United States	3 July 1995	Rhythmic contemporary; contemporary hit radio	Radikal	
