= Nothing Like the Rain =

1995 single by 2 Unlimited

- Artwork for continental European and Australian releases

Single by 2 Unlimited

from the album Real Things
- Released: June 1995
- Genre: Pop
- Length: 4:39; 3:59 (single version)
- Label: Byte
- Songwriters: Phil Wilde; Peter Bauwens; Michael Leahy
- Producers: Phil Wilde; Jean-Paul De Coster; Peter Bauwens

2 Unlimited singles chronology
"Here I Go" (1995)	"Nothing Like the Rain" (1995)	"Do What's Good for Me" (1995)

Music video
- "Nothing Like the Rain" on YouTube

"Nothing Like the Rain" is a song recorded by Belgian/Dutch Eurodance band 2 Unlimited. It was released in June 1995, by Byte Records, as the fourth and final single from their third album, Real Things (1994). The song was written by co-producers Phil Wilde and Peter Bauwens with Michael Leahy. In the US, it was released as a double A-side with the European hit single "Here I Go". It peaked within the top 20 in at least four countries, and was also the first single by 2 Unlimited that was a pop ballad. The single was not released in the UK. Its accompanying music video was directed by Nigel Simpkiss, who had previously directed several videos for the group.

== Critical reception ==
Simon Price from Melody Maker viewed the song as "one uncharacteristic tear-soaked slowie". Mark Sutherland from Smash Hits wrote that "the slow smoochy ballad (yes ballad!)" is "a potential top ten record". In a retrospective review, Pop Rescue complimented it as "brilliant", describing it as "a slow, gentle, beautiful ballad, and it really gives Anita the room to show off her vocals."

== Chart performance ==
"Nothing Like the Rain" was a moderate success on the charts in Europe, entering the top 10 in the band's native Netherlands, peaking at number six in its sixth week on the Dutch Top 40, on 22 July 1995. It spent a total of 10 weeks inside the chart. Additionally, it entered the top 20 in Finland (18), Norway (17) and Spain (14), while it reached the top 30 in Belgium (23). On the Eurochart Hot 100, the single peaked at number 68. It was the first 2 Unlimited single to not receive a UK release, and did not chart on the UK Singles Chart. Outside Europe, "Nothing Like the Rain" became a top-20 hit also in Israel, peaking at number 18 on 4 July 1995, and it also charted in Australia, peaking at number 134.

== Music video ==
The music video for "Nothing Like the Rain" was directed by Nigel Simpkiss and released in the UK in June 1995. The water-themed video features band members Anita Dels and Ray Slijngaard performing in front of or behind raining water. There are shots made in a swimming pool, with a couple embracing each other in the water. Other shots shows flowers, umbrellas, fishes and a frog appearing in the rain. Simpkiss also directed the music videos for "Let the Beat Control Your Body", "The Real Thing" and "Here I Go". "Nothing Like the Rain" was A-listed on Dutch music television channel TMF in July 1995. MTV Europe put the video on prime break out rotation. It was later made available on 2 Unlimited's official YouTube channel in 2014.

== Ballads ==
2 Unlimited included ballads at the end of their three first studio albums:

- "Desire" and "Eternally Yours" on Get Ready!
- "Where Are You Now" and "Shelter for a Rainy Day" on No Limits
- "Nothing Like the Rain" on Real Things (the only ballad the band released as a single)

== Track listings ==
- 7" single
1. "Nothing Like the Rain" (Airplay Edit) (3:59)
2. "Nothing Like the Rain" (Rainy Edit) (3:43)
- 12" single maxi
1. "Nothing Like the Rain" (Rainy Remix) (5:49)
2. "Nothing Like the Rain" (Rainy Edit) (3:43)
3. "No Limit" (X-Out '95) (5:59)
- CD single
1. "Nothing Like the Rain" (Airplay Edit) (3:59)
2. "Nothing Like the Rain" (Rainy Edit) (3:43)
- CD maxi
1. "Nothing Like the Rain" (Airplay Edit) (3:59)
2. "Nothing Like the Rain" (Rainy Edit) (3:43)
3. "Nothing Like the Rain" (Rainy Remix) (5:49)
4. "No Limit" (X-Out '95) (5:59)

== Charts ==
=== Weekly charts ===
Chart (1995)	Peak position
Australia (ARIA)	134
Belgium (Ultratop Flanders)	23
Belgium (Ultratop Wallonia)	29
Europe (Eurochart Hot 100)	68
Europe (European Dance Radio)	4
Finland (Suomen virallinen lista)	18
Israel (Israeli Singles Chart)	18
Netherlands (Dutch Top 40)	6
Netherlands (MegaCharts)	8
Norway (VG-lista)	17
Spain (AFYVE)	14

=== Year-end charts ===
Chart (1995)	Position
Latvia (Latvijas Top 50)	172
Netherlands (Dutch Top 40)	61
Netherlands (Single Top 100)	83
