= No One (2 Unlimited song) =

1994 single by 2 Unlimited

Single by 2 Unlimited

from the album Real Things
- Released: 19 September 1994
- Genre: Eurodance; reggae
- Length: 3:25
- Label: Byte
- Songwriters: Phil Wilde; Jean-Paul De Coster; Ray Slijngaard; Anita Dels
- Producers: Phil Wilde; Jean-Paul De Coster

2 Unlimited singles chronology
"The Real Thing" (1993)	"No One" (1994)	"Here I Go" (1995)

Music video
- "No One" on YouTube

"No One" is a song recorded by Belgian/Dutch Eurodance band 2 Unlimited, released in September 1994 as the second single from their third album, Real Things (1994). Co-written by bandmembers Ray Slijngaard and Anita Dels, it was a top 10 hit in at least six countries, as well as on the Eurochart Hot 100, where the song reached number ten. It features a reference to "That's the Way Love Goes" by Janet Jackson and the accompanying music video, directed by Iain Titterington and Badger Smith, features the band performing on the beach by the Great Barrier Reef in Australia.

== Critical reception ==
In his weekly UK chart commentary, James Masterton commented, "What a nuisance. Here I am all set to launch an account of a new 2 Unlimited single with a witty precis of the melodic and formulaic similarity to everything else they have ever released and what happens? They go and release a track that sounds completely different to all the others! Joking aside, it is absolutely true, 'No One' being the closest they will probably ever get to a conventional pop song and more deservedly a smash hit than some of their recent output. It could well end up their third Top 10 hit of the year and is now their 11th consecutive Top 20 hit." David Stubbs from Melody Maker opined that the song "is apt."

Pan-European magazine Music & Media wrote, "It's their first reggae attempt, and no one has blended it with Euro dance so seamlessly before." Music & Media editor Maria Jimenez remarked that "2 Unlimited have turned their pop rave into tropical pop grooves." Alan Jones from Music Week gave the song a score of four out of five, adding, "This is a good deal slower than usual, but still relies on the he-rap, she-sing template. Likely to garner less club support but may attract some first-time supporters." Iestyn George from NME commented, "He's not a very good rapper that feller, but he plays the pop star to a T." James Hamilton from the Record Mirror Dance Update described it as a "rapped (mentioning Janet Jackson!), cooed and organ wheezed attractive jaunty skipper" in his weekly dance column. Female pop-punk duo Shampoo reviewed the song for Smash Hits, giving it three out of five.

== Chart performance ==
"No One" peaked at number two in the Netherlands and number three in both Belgium and Lithuania. It was a top-10 hit in Denmark, Finland and Spain (10). In the United Kingdom, "No One" was 2 Unlimited's least successful release, peaking at number 17 during its first week on the UK Singles Chart, on 25 September 1994. On the UK Dance Singles Chart, it peaked at number 28 in the same period.

Additionally, the single was a top-20 hit in Austria, France, Germany, Iceland, Ireland, Sweden and Switzerland. On the Eurochart Hot 100, it reached number 10 in late October 1994, during its fifth week on the chart, and was Europe's 64th-best-selling single. On the European Dance Radio Chart, "No One" peaked at number two. Outside Europe, it became a top-20 hit in West Asia, peaking at number 18 in Israel on 11 October 1994. In Oceania, it became a top-70 hit in Australia, peaking at number 70 on the ARIA Singles Chart.

== Music video ==
The music video for "No One" was directed by Iain Titterington and Badger Smith of British production company La La Land. It was shot by the Great Barrier Reef in Australia and features Anita and Ray performing on the beach or in a tropical forest. "No One" was B-listed on German music television channel VIVA in October 1994. The following month, it received active rotation on MTV Europe. In January 1995, it was A-listed on France's MCM. The video was later made available on 2 Unlimited's official YouTube channel in 2013, and had generated more than 7.1 million views as of late 2025 on the platform.

== Appearances ==
The melody of the song was also sampled in 1994 single by Serbian group Moby Dick with name "Kralj kokaina" ("King of Cocaine").

== Track listings ==
- 7-inch single
1. "No One" (Radio Edit)
2. "No One" (Unlimited Remix Edit)
- European CD maxi
1. "No One" (Radio Edit) – 3:27
2. "No One" (Unlimited Remix-Extended) – 5:27
3. "No One" (X-Out Remix) – 6:19
4. "No One" (X-Out In Dub Remix) – 5:45
5. "No One" (Doc Baron Mix) – 6:58
6. "No One" (The It Goes Underground) – 6:36
- European 12-inch maxi
1. "No One" (Unlimited Rmx-Extended) – 5:27
2. "No One" (Extended) – 5:24
3. "No One" (X-Out Remix) – 6:19
4. "No One" (X-Out In Dub Remix) – 5:45
- Italian 12-inch maxi
1. "No One" (Extended) – 5:24
2. "No One" (X-Out Remix) – 6:19
3. "No One" (Radio Edit) – 3:27
4. "No One" (Unlimited Remix Extended) – 5:27
5. "No One" (X-Out In Dub Remix) – 5:45
6. "No One" (Unlimited Remix Edited) – 3:45
- UK CD single
1. "No One" (Radio Edit) – 3:29
2. "No One" (Unlimited Remix) – 5:29
3. "No One" (Extended) – 5:26
4. "No One" (X-Out Remix) – 6:21
5. "No One" (X-Out In Dub Remix) – 5:45

== Charts ==
=== Weekly charts ===
Chart (1994)	Peak position
Australia (ARIA)	70
Austria (Ö3 Austria Top 40)	14
Belgium (Ultratop 50 Flanders)	3
Belgium (VRT Top 30 Flanders)	3
Belgium (Ultratop 50 Wallonia)	1
Denmark (IFPI)	10
Europe (Eurochart Hot 100)	10
Europe (European Dance Radio)	2
Europe (European Hit Radio)	36
Finland (Suomen virallinen lista)	6
France (SNEP)	19
Germany (Media Control Charts)	18
Iceland (Íslenski Listinn Topp 40)	17
Ireland (IRMA)	18
Israel (Israeli Singles Chart)	18
Lithuania (M-1)	3
Netherlands (Dutch Top 40)	2
Netherlands (Single Top 100)	3
Scotland (OCC)	14
Spain (AFYVE)	10
Sweden (Sverigetopplistan)	15
Switzerland (Schweizer Hitparade)	15
UK Singles (OCC)	17
UK Dance (OCC)	28

=== Year-end charts ===
Chart (1994)	Position
Belgium (Ultratop)	29
Europe (Eurochart Hot 100)	64
Netherlands (Dutch Top 40)	21
Netherlands (Single Top 100)	32
UK Singles (OCC)	177

Chart (1995)	Position
Latvia (Latvijas Top 50)	131

== Release history ==
Region	Date	Format(s)	Label(s)	Ref.
United Kingdom	19 September 1994	7-inch vinyl; 12-inch vinyl; CD; cassette	PWL Continental	
Australia	10 October 1994	CD; cassette	Liberation; Byte	
Japan	10 October 1994	CD	Mercury	
