= Bizz Nizz =

Dance act

Bizz Nizz was a Belgian dance act formed in 1989 by Jean-Paul de Coster of Antwerp.

The dancefloor-filling singles "We're Gonna Catch You!" and "Don't Miss the Party Line" were both substantial hits across Europe. In the UK, "Don't Miss the Party Line" reached number seven on the UK Singles Chart in April 1990.

The following year, de Coster and the band's remixer Phil Wilde formed 2 Unlimited, with performers Ray Slijngaard and Anita Doth.

== Discography ==
| Year | Single | Peak positions | | | | | | |
| Year | Single | BEL (FLA) | AUS | AUT | GER | ITA | IRE | UK |
|---|---|---|---|---|---|---|---|---|
| 1989 | "We're Gonna Catch You!" | — | — | — | — | — | — | — |
| 1990 | "Don't Miss the Party Line" | 24 | 124 | 9 | 10 | 20 | 9 | 7 |
| 1990 | "Get Into Trance" | — | — | — | 28 | 47 | — | — |
| 1996 | "Dabadabiaboo" | — | — | — | — | — | — | — |
| 1997 | "Party People" | — | — | — | — | — | — | — |
| 1998 | "Get Up and Boogie" | — | — | — | — | — | — | — |
"—" denotes releases that did not chart or were not released.
