= Get Ready for This =

1991 single by 2 Unlimited

- Standard European and Australian artwork

Single by 2 Unlimited

from the album Get Ready!
- Released: 23 September 1991
- Genre: Eurodance; rave
- Length: 3:46
- Label: Byte
- Songwriters: Phil Wilde; Jean-Paul de Coster; Ray Slijngaard
- Producers: Phil Wilde; Jean-Paul de Coster

2 Unlimited singles chronology
"Get Ready for This" (1991)	"Twilight Zone" (1992)

Audio sample
- file; help

Music video
- "Get Ready for This" on YouTube

"Get Ready for This" is a song recorded by Belgian/Dutch music group 2 Unlimited as their debut single. It was released on 23 September 1991 as the lead single from their debut album, Get Ready! (1992). Originally, the single was produced as an instrumental track in May 1991, titled the "Orchestral Mix". It became a hit and conscious of their popularity, Wilde & De Coster wanted a more accessible, formatted formula for their project to grow. Ray was then asked to write lyrics and add a rap to the track. On Ray Slijngaard's suggestion, Anita Doth joined as the female vocalist.

The single was an immediate success throughout Europe, Australia and the United States. In the US, the song appeared on various Billboard charts between 1992 and 1995, peaking at number 14 on the Dance Club Play chart, number 17 on the Top 40/Mainstream chart and number 38 on the Billboard Hot 100, making it the band's only top-40 hit in the US. In both Australia and the United Kingdom, the single reached number two.

The song is one of the most frequently played songs at sporting events around the world. It earned one of BMI's Pop Awards of 1996, and in 2010, Pitchfork included it in their list of "Ten Actually Good 90s Jock Jams".

== Background and release ==
In 1990, producers Phil Wilde and Jean-Paul de Coster had previously gained success with AB Logic, and were looking for another vehicle for their songs. 2 Unlimited formed when Wilde and DeCoster were introduced to rapper Ray Slijngaard and vocalist Anita Doth by Marvin D., who had featured both in his rap group in the past. "Get Ready for This" originally was produced as an instrumental white label track intended for the clubs. At a meeting at a record store, Slijngaard by chance came over the instrumental and Wilde played it to get Slijngaard's opinion. Slijngaard got goosebumps hearing it and told that he could write a rap for the track. Two weeks later he received a demo tape at his father's house and started writing the rap. While writing, he also came up with a chorus for a female part. The whole song was written in two hours, and it was also the first time Slijngaard wrote a song.

The producers agreed with him on adding a female singer on the track and Doth joined as the female vocalist of 2 Unlimited. "Get Ready for This" was recorded in a small studio behind the Amsterdam central station. The rap version was released with verses by Slijngaard and vocals by Doth. For the UK release of the single, an edit of the original "Orchestral Mix" was used, without vocals, except for the line Y'all ready for this? This was sampled from The D.O.C.'s hit single "It's Funky Enough". This edit was done by record producer Pete Waterman, who owned the record label which 2 Unlimited were licensed to for UK releases. Next the song was number two on the UK Singles Chart and the group performed on Top of the Pops for the first time.

== Critical reception ==
Larry Flick from Billboard magazine wrote, "Spirited and melodic techno/houser reaches these shores after massive pop and club success in the U.K. Although it has yet to be confirmed, rumor has it that famed hi-NRG producers Mike Stock and Pete Waterman are the creative force behind this peak-hour treat. Look for jocks to devour this one heartily." Carolyn Chard from The Canberra Times described the song a "mammoth rave hit". She added further, "An instantly recognisable, hands-in-the-air track it belongs to the same Belgium-Dutch school of techno house that produced Quadrophonia, T99 and Technotronic." Andy Kastanas from The Charlotte Observer stated that "the raving keyboards and hypnotic dance beat make for a super dance record."

== Chart performance ==
"Get Ready for This" was successful on the charts on several continents. In Europe, it was a top-10 hit in Belgium, Ireland, Luxembourg, the Netherlands, Spain and the United Kingdom, as well as on the Eurochart Hot 100, where it reached number four. In the UK, the single reached also number two during its fourth week on the UK Singles Chart, on 20 October 1991. It spent a total of two weeks at that position. Additionally, "Get Ready for This" climbed into the top 30 in Finland and the top 40 in Sweden. Outside Europe, it peaked at number two in Australia, number five in Zimbabwe, number six on the RPM Dance chart in Canada and, in the United States, it reached numbers 14 and 38 on the Billboard Hot Dance Club Play and Billboard Hot 100 charts, respectively. In West Asia, the song became a top-20 hit in Israel, peaking at number 11 on 19 November 1991.

== Impact and legacy ==
"Get Ready for This" was awarded one of BMI's Pop Awards of 1996, honoring the songwriters, composers and music publishers of the song. In 2010, Pitchfork included it in their list of "Ten Actually Good 90s Jock Jams". In February 2024, Billboard magazine ranked the song number ten in their list of "The 100 Greatest Jock Jams of All Time", writing, "A song that cast a greater shadow over ’90s sports culture than anything besides Shaquille O’Neal."

"Get Ready for This" was the unofficial theme song of the NBA’s San Antonio Spurs, with the song being a staple at Spurs games (including starting lineups) until the 2006-07 season.

The song is heavily sampled in Kylie Minogue’s track “I Guess I Like It Like That.”

== Track listings ==
- 7-inch, Byte Records / BYTE 7006 (Benelux)

A: "Get Ready for This (Rap Version)" – 3:42
B: "Get Ready for This (Instrumental)" – 3:42

- 7-inch, PWL Continental / PWL 206 (UK)

A: "Get Ready for This (Orchestral Edit)" – 2:53
B: "Get Ready for This (800 Edit)" – 3:30

- 12-inch, PWL Continental / PWLT 206 (UK)

A: "Get Ready for This (Orchestral Edit)" – 5:31
B: "Get Ready for This (800 Edit)" – 5:14

- 12-inch, ZYX Records / ZYX 6599-12 (Germany)

A: "Get Ready for This (Orchestral Mix)" – 5:26
B: "Get Ready for This (Rap Version)" – 5:54
BB: "Get Ready for This (Wilde Mix)" – 5:57

- 12-inch, Hot Productions / HAL 12256 (US)

A: "Get Ready for This (Orchestral Edit)" – 5:31
B: "Get Ready for This (800 Edit)" – 5:14
BB: "Pacific Walk" – 3:05

- The Remixes 12-inch, Hot Productions / HAL 12261 (US)

A: "Get Ready for This (Orchestral Mix)" – 5:26
AA: "Get Ready for This (Rap Version)" – 5:54
B: "Get Ready for This (Wilde Mix)" – 5:57
BB: "Get Ready for This (Rio & Le Jean Mix)" – 3:08

- CD, Byte Records / BYTE 5006 (Benelux)
1. "Get Ready for This" (Rap Version) – 5:53
2. "Get Ready for This" (Orchestral Mix) – 5:31
3. "Get Ready for This" (Wilde Mix) – 5:55
4. "Get Ready for This" (Rio & Le Jean Mix) – 3:06
5. "Get Ready for This" (Rapversion Edit) – 3:42
- CD, PWL Continental / PWCD 206 (UK)
1. "Get Ready for This (Orchestral Mix:Edit)" – 2:53
2. "Get Ready for This (Orchestral Mix)" – 5:31
3. "Get Ready for This (800 Mix:Edit)" – 3:30
- CD, ZYX Records / ZYX 6599-8 (Germany)
1. "Get Ready for This" (7-inch Rap Version) – 3:42
2. "Get Ready for This" (Orchestral Mix) – 5:26
3. "Get Ready for This (Rap Version)" – 5:54
4. "Get Ready for This" (Wilde Mix) – 5:57
- CD, Critique / 01624 15490-2 (US)
1. "Get Ready for This (Radio Mix)" – 3:42
2. "Get Ready for This (No Rap Mix)" – 2:51
3. "Get Ready for This (Rap Mix)" – 5:26
4. "Get Ready for This (Orchestral Mix)" – 5:54
5. "Get Ready for The Twilight Zone" – 3:55

== Charts ==
=== Weekly charts ===
Chart (1991–1995)	Peak position
Australia (ARIA)	2
Belgium (Ultratop 50 Flanders)	8
Canada Dance/Urban (RPM)	6
Europe (Eurochart Hot 100)	4
Europe (European Dance Radio)	4
Europe (European Hit Radio)	37
Finland (Suomen virallinen lista)	28
Ireland (IRMA)	3
Israel (Israeli Singles Chart)	11
Luxembourg (Radio Luxembourg)	3
Netherlands (Dutch Top 40)	10
Netherlands (Single Top 100)	10
New Zealand (Recorded Music NZ)	50
Spain (AFYVE)	2
Sweden (Sverigetopplistan)	36
UK Singles (Official Charts)	2
UK Airplay (Music Week)	33
UK Dance (Music Week)	11
UK Club Chart (Record Mirror)	17
US Billboard Hot 100	38
US 12-inch Singles Sales (Billboard)	32
US Dance Club Play (Billboard)	14
US Top 40/Mainstream (Billboard)	17
US Top 40/Rhythm-Crossover (Billboard)	36
US Cash Box Top 100	68
Zimbabwe (ZIMA)	5

=== Year-end charts ===
Chart (1991)	Rank
Belgium (Ultratop 50 Flanders)	88
UK Singles (OCC)	11

Chart (1992)	Rank
Australia (ARIA)	28
Brazil (Crowley)	96
Netherlands (Single Top 100)	95

== Certifications and sales ==
Region	Certification	Certified units/sales
Australia (ARIA)	Gold	35,000^{^}
Summaries
Worldwide	—	540,000
^{^} Shipments figures based on certification alone.

== Release history ==
Region	Date	Format(s)	Label(s)	Ref.
United Kingdom	23 September 1991	7-inch vinyl; 12-inch vinyl; CD; cassette	PWL Continental	
Japan	25 January 1992	Mini-CD	Mercury	
Australia	27 January 1992	12-inch vinyl; CD; cassette	Liberation; Byte	

== Yves Deruyter remixes ==
"Get Ready for This" (Yves Deruyter remix)

Single by 2 Unlimited
- Released: May 2001
- Label: White Label
- Songwriters: Phil Wilde; Jean-Paul de Coster; Ray Slijngaard

After the moderate success of the 2 Unlimited compilation album Greatest Hits Remixes in 2001, two white labels were released with remixes of "Get Ready for This". The first 12-inch was released in May 2001 in Belgium with a remix by DJ/producer Yves Deruyter. Although just a single sided pressing featuring the full 12-inch remix, the radio edit was officially released later in the 2002 release Trance Remixes (Special Edition).

=== Track listing ===
- 12-inch white label

A: "Get Ready for This" (Yves Deruyter Remix)

== Robbie Rivera remixes ==
Following the May 2001 release of the Yves Deruyter remixes, August the same year saw the release of another "Get Ready for This" remix by Puerto Rican DJ/producer Robbie Rivera.

=== Track listing ===
- 12-inch white label

A: "Get Ready for This" (Robbie's Bangin' Dub)
B1: "Get Ready for This" (68 Beat Monster Mix)
B2: "Get Ready for This" (Robbie Rivera Remix)

== Steve Aoki remixes ==
"Get Ready for This" (Steve Aoki remix)

Single by 2 Unlimited
- Released: 28 October 2013
- Label: Byte
- Songwriters: Phil Wilde; Jean-Paul de Coster; Ray Slijngaard

2 Unlimited singles chronology
"Tribal Dance 2.4" (2004)	"Get Ready for This" (Steve Aoki remix) (2013)

In 2013, American DJ/producer Steve Aoki released a remix of "Get Ready for This" on Byte Records as part of a forthcoming 2 Unlimited greatest hits album. The Rap and Orchestral mixes featured on the original "Get Ready for This" single were also included.

=== Track listing ===
- Download 1 (Steve Aoki Remixes EP)
1. "Get Ready" (Steve Aoki Instrumental Extended) (5:25)
2. "Get Ready" (Steve Aoki Instrumental Edit) (4:21)
3. "Get Ready" (2013 Rap Version Edit) (3:42)
4. "Get Ready" (2013 Orchestral Mix) (5:26)
- Download 2 (Steve Aoki Radio Mixes)
1. "Get Ready" (Steve Aoki Vocal Radio Edit) (2:55)
2. "Get Ready" (Steve Aoki Instrumental Radio Edit) (2:55)

=== Charts ===
Chart (2013)	Peak position
Netherlands (Dutch Dance Top 30)	28
