= Real Things (2 Unlimited album) =

Studio album by 2 Unlimited
- Released: 6 June 1994
- Recorded: 1994
- Genres: Eurodance; techno; dance-pop
- Length: 57:20
- Label: Byte Records (Sony / PWL) BYTE 103-9
- Producers: Jean-Paul de Coster (exec. prod.), Phil Wilde, et al.

2 Unlimited chronology
No Limits! (1993)	Real Things (1994)	Hits Unlimited (1995)

Alternative cover
- UK cover

Singles from Real Things
- 1. "The Real Thing" Released: 9 May 1994; 2. "No One" Released: 19 September 1994; 3. "Here I Go" Released: 6 March 1995; 4. "Nothing Like the Rain" Released: 12 June 1995

Real Things is the third album by Belgian/Dutch Eurodance act 2 Unlimited, released in 1994. It was the band's second number one album in the UK and despite spending just nine weeks in the UK Albums Chart Top 75, it was certified gold there and platinum in The Netherlands. "The Real Thing", "Here I Go", "No One" and "Nothing Like the Rain" were released as singles. Unlike their previous album, Ray Slijngaard's raps on the verses were not cut for the UK release.

== Critical reception ==
Professional ratings
Review scores
Source	Rating
AllMusic	2/5 stars
Music Week	4/5 stars
NME	8/10
Pop Rescue	(favorable)
Select	3/5 medals
Smash Hits	3/5 stars

Generally, the music press were kinder to this album than previous album No Limits!. Alan Jones from Music Week gave Real Things four out of five and named it Pick of the Week. He wrote, "Most of tracks on this album follow the tried and trusted formula. Only on the latter half of the album do they attempt to vary the tempo. Their run of hits continues unabated, and this is likely to emulate the chart-topping exploits of their last album." Beau Quantick from NME gave it eight out of ten. Tim Marsh from Select noted that "The Real Thing" "has a funky key riff", while "Sensuality" and "Something Wild" "explore darker sounds." Smash Hits' Mark Sutherland stated that "every song is a potential top 10 record" and that "for techno [...] mayhem, you can't beat Real Things".

== Track listing ==
1. "The Real Thing" – 3:40
2. "Do What I Like" – 4:07
3. "Here I Go" – 5:10
4. "Burning Like Fire" – 4:54
5. "Info Superhighway" – 4:35
6. "Hypnotised" – 4:22
7. "Tuning Into Something Wild" – 4:05
8. "Escape In Music" – 3:52
9. "Sensuality" – 4:27
10. "No One" – 3:25
11. "Face To Face" – 4:03
12. "What's Mine Is Mine" – 4:57
13. "Nothing Like the Rain" – 4:39

== Personnel ==
Adapted from AllMusic.

- 2 Unlimited – primary artist
- Peter Bauwens – arranger, producer, vocal arrangement
- Peter Bulkens – mixing
- Jean-Paul DeCoster – arranger, executive producer, producer
- Andy Janssens – remixing
- Phil Wilde – arranger, composer, engineer, producer

== Charts ==
Chart performance for Real Things
Chart (1994)	Peak position
Australian Albums (ARIA)	18
Austrian Albums (Ö3 Austria)	4
Canada Top Albums/CDs (RPM)	33
Dutch Albums (Album Top 100)	1
French Albums (SNEP)	6
German Albums (Offizielle Top 100)	3
Hungarian Albums (MAHASZ)	1
New Zealand Albums (RMNZ)	19
Norwegian Albums (VG-lista)	14
Swedish Albums (Sverigetopplistan)	2
Swiss Albums (Schweizer Hitparade)	3
UK Albums (Official Charts)	1

== Certifications and sales ==
Region	Certification	Certified units/sales
Brazil	—	50,000
Finland (Musiikkituottajat)	Gold	36,700
France (SNEP)	2× Gold	200,000^{*}
Japan (RIAJ)	Gold	100,000^{^}
Netherlands (NVPI)	Platinum	100,000^{^}
Switzerland (IFPI Switzerland)	Gold	25,000^{^}
United Kingdom (BPI)	Gold	100,000^{^}
Summaries
Worldwide	—	1,700,000
^{*} Sales figures based on certification alone.^{^} Shipments figures based on certification alone.
