= Let the Beat Control Your Body =

1994 single by 2 Unlimited

- Artwork for continental European releases

Single by 2 Unlimited

from the album No Limits
- Released: 21 January 1994
- Genre: Techno-pop
- Length: 4:02; 3:38 (single remix)
- Label: Byte
- Songwriters: Phil Wilde; Jean-Paul De Coster; Ray Slijngaard; Anita Dels
- Producers: Phil Wilde; Jean-Paul De Coster

2 Unlimited singles chronology
"Maximum Overdrive" (1993)	"Let the Beat Control Your Body" (1994)	"The Real Thing" (1994)

Music video
- "Let the Beat Control Your Body" on YouTube

"Let the Beat Control Your Body" is a song by Belgian/Dutch Eurodance band 2 Unlimited. It was released in January 1994 as the fifth and final single from the band's second album, No Limits (1993). The album version is largely instrumental and contains just a few spoken words from bandmembers Ray Slijngaard and Anita Doth. The single version contains full verses rapped by Slijngaard and a new chorus sung by Doth, which were co-written by them both.

The song experienced chart success in many European countries, peaking at number two in the Netherlands and entering the top 10 in Belgium, Finland, France, Germany, Ireland, Spain and the United Kingdom. It was nominated in the category for Best Song on MTV Awards. Nigel Simpkiss directed the music video for "Let the Beat Control Your Body", which received heavy rotation on music television channels such as MTV Europe and VIVA.

== Reception and airplay ==
Miranda Sawyer from The Guardian wrote, "The result is a hectic fusion of marching techno beat, catchy tune, and marvellously bossy lyrics: 'Speed up the pace./ Take it to the maximum./ Let the beat control your body.'" Simon Price from Melody Maker commented, "Try listening to the intros to 'No Limit' and 'Let the Beat Control Your Body' without going at it like a woodpecker on poppers." James Hamilton from Music Week's RM Dance Update described the song as a "techno-pop galloper". Stephen Dalton from NME wrote that songs like this "are about clean, controlled fun and strict discipline booted along by stormtrooper hardcore beats designed to encourage Eurokids to work hard and use leisure time constructively." Scottish Perthshire Advertiser stated, "You know what to expect and, yes, they deliver it!" Mark Frith from Smash Hits described it as "buzzy" in his review of the No Limits album, complimenting it as a song "that stands out individually." Another Smash Hits editor, Tony Cross, gave it two out of five, saying, "It's still techno, techno, techno with a dash of techno for good measure."

"Let the Beat Control Your Body" entered the European airplay chart Border Breakers at number 16 on 4 February due to crossover airplay in Central-, North West- and North-Europe and peaked at number four on 19 March. It also reached number one on the European Dance Radio Chart, becoming the most-played dance song on European radio stations that week.

== Chart performance ==
In Europe, "Let the Beat Control Your Body" entered the top 10 in Belgian Flanders, Finland, Germany, Ireland, the Netherlands, Spain and the United Kingdom. In the Netherlands, it peaked at number two for two weeks from 26 February 1994, being held off reaching the top spot by the single "Ik wil niet dat je liegt" / "Waarheen waarvoor" by Paul de Leeuw and Annie de Rooy. In Germany, the song peaked at number eight on the German Singles Chart and spent 18 weeks within the chart. In the UK, it peaked at number six on 27 February, during its third week on the UK Singles Chart. It spent ten weeks within the UK Top 100 and also charted on the UK Dance Singles chart by Music Week, peaking at number 14. On the Eurochart Hot 100, "Let the Beat Control Your Body" reached number five in its fourth week on the chart in March 1994. Additionally, the song was a top-20 hit in Austria, Denmark, Sweden and Switzerland. Outside Europe, it peaked at numbers 29 and 39 in New Zealand and Australia, respectively. In West Asia, it became a top-10 hit in Israel, peaking at number six on 15 February 1994.

== Music video ==
The accompanying music video for "Let the Beat Control Your Body" was directed by Nigel Simpkiss, produced by Swivel Films and released in the UK in January 1994. It received heavy rotation on MTV Europe and was A-listed on Germany's VIVA. In the video, Anita Doth and Ray Slijngaard perform in front of a wall consisting of vibrating speakers. In between, several gymnasts and dancers are performing, mixed with computer generated images. In the rap part, Slijngaard trains bare-chested with weights. Tom Sheehan from Melody Maker felt the 2 Unlimited look in the video was very provocative: "Head-to-toe PVC suffocation gear. It was very S&M. Stephen Milligan would have loved it."

== Appearances ==
Dance music artist Chaah (a.k.a. Susanne Jark) uses the melody from "Let the Beat Control Your Body" in her 1999 release titled "The Funkiness of You". It also became famous again because of Britain's Got Talent when act DJ John performed the song in the auditions.

== Track listings ==
- 7-inch single
1. "Let the Beat Control Your Body" (airplay edit)
2. "Get Ready for No Limits" (Part 2)
- Belgian 12-inch maxi
1. "Let the Beat Control Your Body" (X-Out in Trance) (5:11)
2. "Let the Beat Control Your Body" (extended) (5:58)
3. "Let the Beat Control Your Body" (extended) (5:58)
4. "Get Ready for No Limits" (Murphy's Megamix Part 2) (6:45)
- Germany 12-inch maxi
1. "Let the Beat Control Your Body" (X-Out in Trance remix) (5:11)
2. "Let the Beat Control Your Body" (extended) (5:58)
3. "Let the Beat Control Your Body" (X-Out in Rio) (5:06)
4. "Get Ready for No Limits" (Murphy's Megamix Part 2) (6:45)
- UK CD single
1. "Let the Beat Control Your Body" (airplay edit) (3:38)
2. "Let the Beat Control Your Body" (X-Out in Rio) (5:06)
3. "Murphy's Megamix Part 1"
4. "Get Ready for no Limits" (Murphy's Megamix Part 2) (6:45)
- Australian CD maxi
1. "Let the Beat Control Your Body" (airplay edit)
2. "Let the Beat Control Your Body" (X-Out in Trance)
3. "Let the Beat Control Your Body" (extended)
4. "Let the Beat Control Your Body" (X-Out in Rio)
5. "Murphy's Megamix Pt 2"
- Dutch CD maxi
1. "Let the Beat Control Your Body" (airplay edit) (3:38)
2. "Let the Beat Control Your Body" (X-Out in Trance) (5:11)
3. "Let the Beat Control Your Body" (extended) (5:58)
4. "Let the Beat Control Your Body" (X-Out in Rio) (5:06)
5. "Get Ready for no Limits" (Murphy's Megamix Part 2) (6:45)

== Charts ==
=== Weekly charts ===
Chart (1994–1995)	Peak position
Australia (ARIA)	39
Austria (Ö3 Austria Top 40)	11
Belgium (Ultratop 50 Flanders)	4
Denmark (IFPI)	16
Europe (Eurochart Hot 100)	5
Europe (European Dance Radio)	1
Europe (European Hit Radio)	29
Finland (Suomen virallinen lista)	3
France (SNEP)	10
Germany (GfK)	8
Ireland (IRMA)	6
Israel (Israeli Singles Chart)	6
Netherlands (Dutch Top 40)	2
Netherlands (Single Top 100)	2
New Zealand (Recorded Music NZ)	29
Scotland (Official Charts)	7
Spain (AFYVE)	10
Sweden (Sverigetopplistan)	11
Switzerland (Schweizer Hitparade)	11
UK Singles (Official Charts)	6
UK Dance (Music Week)	14

=== Year-end charts ===
Chart (1994)	Position
Belgium (Ultratop 50 Flanders)	50
Europe (Eurochart Hot 100)	34
Europe (European Dance Radio)	12
Germany (Media Control)	57
Netherlands (Dutch Top 40)	39
Netherlands (Single Top 100)	30
Sweden (Topplistan)	46
UK Singles (OCC)	70

== Release history ==
Region	Date	Format(s)	Label(s)	Ref.
Germany	21 January 1994	7-inch vinyl; 12-inch vinyl; CD	ZYX	
United Kingdom	7 February 1994	7-inch vinyl; 12-inch vinyl; CD; cassette	PWL Continental	
Australia	7 March 1994	CD; cassette	Liberation	
