= 2 Unlimited =

Belgian/Dutch Eurodance group

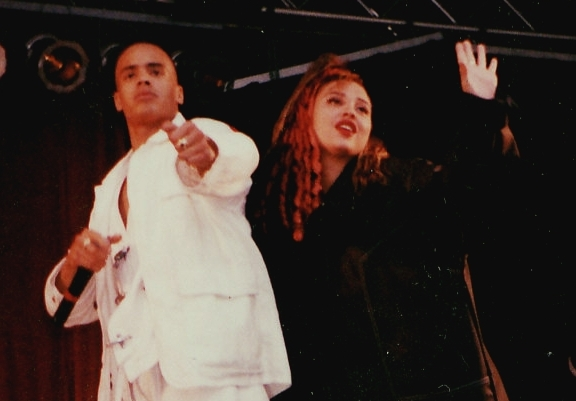
- 2 Unlimited performing in 1994

Background information
- Origin: Antwerp, Belgium
- Genres: Eurodance; techno; dance-pop
- Years active: 1991–1996; 1998–1999; 2001–2006; 2012–present
- Labels: Byte; PWL Continental; ZYX; Quality; Radikal
- Spinoffs: Ray & Anita
- Members: Ray Slijngaard; Michèle Karamat Ali
- Past members: Anita Doth; Kim Vergouwen; Romy van Ooijen; Marjon van Iwaarden
- Website: 2unlimitedlive.com

2 Unlimited are a Belgian-Dutch dance music act, founded by Belgian producers/songwriters Jean-Paul De Coster and Phil Wilde in 1991 in Antwerp, Belgium. From 1991 to 1996, Dutch rapper Ray Slijngaard and Dutch vocalist Anita Doth fronted the act. During these five years, 2 Unlimited enjoyed worldwide mainstream success. They scored a total of sixteen international chart hits, including "Get Ready for This", "Twilight Zone", "No Limit", "Faces", and "Tribal Dance". The act has sold eighteen million records worldwide. Although they enjoyed less mainstream recognition in the United States than in Europe, several of their tracks became popular themes in American sporting series, mainly in the NBA and NHL.

== History ==
=== Formation ===
Jean-Paul De Coster and Phil Wilde met in their hometown of Antwerp, Belgium, and created 2 Unlimited in their studio, initially without any performers or vocalists. Their first collaboration under the name of Bizz Nizz resulted in a single called "Don't Miss The Party Line" which entered the top 10 in the UK. The two then decided to continue to work together.

De Coster and Wilde had initially created an instrumental track called "Get Ready for This" in May 1991, but they wanted to try out some rap vocals on it. De Coster recalls:

That 12-inch single became a club hit, and we invited [rapper] Ray Slijngaard to have a go at it. We had worked with him on "Money Money", an unreleased single by Bizz Nizz. By September he returned the tape to us. To our surprise, he had also added the female vocals of a certain Anita Doth, a traffic warden from Amsterdam. He told us she was a good friend of his out of the city's nightlife. Ray discussed the possibility of forming a duo to front the project.

They were so pleased with the result that they agreed to work with them as a duo, and so 2 Unlimited was born.

=== Get Ready! (1991–1992) ===
2 Unlimited were signed to Byte Records (Belgium) and licensed to many other record labels worldwide, including PWL Continental in the UK, ZYX in Germany, Switzerland, and Austria, Scorpio in France, etc. Their first single, "Get Ready for This", was well received in their home markets, peaking at No. 8 in Belgium, and No. 10 in the Netherlands. It became a No. 2 hit record in both Australia and the UK. The single worked its way up to No. 38 on the U.S. Billboard Hot 100 chart, three years after its original release.

A follow-up single, "Twilight Zone", followed in January 1992, topping the charts in the Netherlands and performing well in many other markets, reaching No. 2 in the UK. In the United States, it only reached No. 49 on the Hot 100 but got to No. 5 on the Hot Dance Club Play chart). To capitalize on this success, the album Get Ready! was released on 24 February 1992, featuring the first two singles and seven more new tracks, including two ballads. Two further singles were released from the album: "Workaholic" and "The Magic Friend". In the US, the album received a Gold certification for sales of 500,000 units in 1995.

=== No Limits! (1993–1994) ===
2 Unlimited's lead single from their second album, the similarly titled "No Limit", was released in January 1993. The repetitive nature of the song helped it become their most successful single to date and by far the best remembered by the general public. It topped the charts in Austria, Belgium, Finland, France, Ireland, the Netherlands, Norway, Sweden, Switzerland, and the UK. In Germany, it was certified Platinum for sales of 500,000 units. The track received modest airplay on North American radio stations, reaching the top 25 in the US dance charts. By 1996, worldwide sales had reached 2.3 million units.

"Tribal Dance" was released as a single shortly before the album No Limits! hit stores in May 1993. It became a top 5 hit in Austria, Australia, Belgium, France, Germany, Norway, Sweden, Switzerland, and the UK. In Germany, "Tribal Dance" was certified Gold for sales of over 250,000 units. Three further singles were issued from the second album: "Faces", which was considerably different in pace to previous releases; "Maximum Overdrive"; and a re-recorded version of "Let the Beat Control Your Body". For the French edition of this single, the lyrics were changed to "Let the bass control your body", in a version named "Bass Edit", to avoid any confusion with the slang word "bite" (meaning "penis").

In May 1993, the duo received a World Music Award for World's Best-Selling Dutch Artists.

2 Unlimited's second album proved more successful than their first, entering the top five of album charts in Austria, Australia, Germany, the Netherlands, Norway, Sweden, and Switzerland. In the UK, the album reached the top of the album chart. By 1996, its total sales had reached three million units, including 592,000 units in the GSA region (Germany, Switzerland, Austria).

Despite the phenomenal success the duo were enjoying in the UK, they were criticised heavily by the music industry, and the British press dubbed them "2 Untalented".

=== Real Things (1994–1995) ===
In May 1994, the duo's tenth single, "The Real Thing", was released, and it proved that their fans were still interested, as they sent the single to No. 1 in the Netherlands, as well as the top 5 in Belgium, Germany, and Norway. The same month, they received an award for World's Best-Selling Benelux Recording Artists at the World Music Awards.

While the duo's third album, Real Things, shot to No. 1 in the Netherlands and the UK, it also managed to land in the top 5 in Austria, Germany, Norway, Sweden, and Switzerland. The record was certified Gold in the UK for sales of over 100,000 units.

The second single from Real Things, "No One", despite being a straightforward pop song, didn't prevent it from reaching No. 2 in the Netherlands' sales chart.

In March 1995, while the follow-up single, "Here I Go", was another top 5 hit in the Netherlands, the band's commercial success seemed to be declining elsewhere—the song only made it to the top 20 in Austria, Belgium, and Sweden. The fourth and final single, the ballad "Nothing Like the Rain", was not as successful and was not released in many territories, including the UK. In May 1995, 2 Unlimited won their third World Music Award in a row, this time for World's Best-Selling Benelux Artist.

=== Hits Unlimited (1995–1996) ===
In October 1995, 2 Unlimited released their first compilation album, Hits Unlimited, prompting rumours that they were about to split up. The first single, "Do What's Good for Me", entered the top 5 in Finland, and the top 20 in the Netherlands and the UK. Despite their insistence that they were planning a world tour, in April 1996, shortly after the release of the single "Jump for Joy", both Slijngaard and Doth decided not to extend their five-year contract and left 2 Unlimited.

It later emerged that after having spent so much time together, they were no longer getting on as well as they once had, and there was disagreement about the future sound of the band. They had asked for more creative input and they also felt that they were not getting a fair share of the huge amount of money being earned by the project. As no agreement was reached, they each went their separate ways before a final single, "Spread Your Love", was released in June 1996.

=== II (1998–1999) ===
De Coster and Wilde recruited two new (again Dutch) singers, Romy van Ooijen and Marjon van Iwaarden. The first single released under the new lineup, "Wanna Get Up", reached No. 10 on the Dutch Top 40 and No. 38 in the UK.

The album II was released in April 1998. It was not as successful as previous studio albums, nor were the subsequent singles, "Edge of Heaven" and "Never Surrender". In the first week of 1999, Byte Records announced that van Ooijen had left 2 Unlimited.

=== Remixes (2000–2006) ===
In 2000, Byte Records released the remix singles "No Limit" and "Twilight Zone". A remix album was to be released that year, but some master tapes were stolen from Byte and taken to Russia, where they were released as a bootleg compilation. Also that year, 2 Unlimited made their first appearance on the Eurodance compilation Dancemania series, specifically its Speed sub-series, with their song "Twilight Zone", 'B4 Za Beat Mix'.

In 2001, Byte finally released "Greatest Hits Remixes", featuring many new remixes. Some of the tracks from the stolen master tapes released in Russia were not included. The album was released solely in Japan. In 2002, Trance Remixes: Special Edition was released in Japan, featuring many more new remixes not included in the previous compilation.

In the following years, many "best of" compilations have been released in various territories, often with new remixes. Most notably, ZYX Records released "No Limit 2.3" in 2003 and it was a moderate hit, reaching no. 41 in the German singles chart. It was promoted by a new duo, Débora Remagen and James Giscombe. They were being lined up as a 2 Unlimited "version 3". They still perform, mainly in Eastern Europe, but are not allowed to use their own voices. This is due to copyright issues.

A new CD and DVD set containing all 2 Unlimited music videos, called The Complete History, was released in 2004, along with a single, "Tribal Dance 2.4" (originally released on 12" vinyl in November 2003 as "Tribal Dance 2.3"). 2005 saw the release of The Refreshed Album in Mexico, featuring stunning artwork, but the same remixes found on previous remix albums. In 2006, the DVD was re-packaged with a different CD, Greatest Remix Hits, and released in Australia. The following years saw this package re-released in Argentina, Denmark, Sweden, Asia, and South Africa.

=== Reunions (2009–2012) ===
Having both continued to perform their old hits separately in nightclubs and university student unions around the world, the original performers Slijngaard and Doth reunited on 11 April 2009, to perform together for the first time in 13 years at the "I Love the 90s" concert in Hasselt, Belgium. According to a radio interview with Slijngaard, Jean-Paul De Coster did not give permission for the duo to perform under the name 2 Unlimited; however, Phil Wilde attended the gig and provided help with preparing backing tracks.

On 30 April 2009, Slijngaard and Doth performed five songs at the Radio 538 Queen's Day concert at Museumplein in Amsterdam. On 8 June, they were awarded "Most Popular Act of the 1990s", based on the number of weeks in the Dutch Top 40; on 25 September, they performed as a support act for Milk Inc. at the Sportpaleis in Antwerp.

On 29 December 2009, it was announced that the duo would release a new single in 2010, called "In Da Name of Love", as Ray & Anita. It was released as a CD single in the Netherlands through Spinnin' Records on 22 January 2010. It reached No. 6 on the Dutch Top 40 sales chart. On 30 April 2010, a new single was presented during the Dutch Queen's Day, called "Still Unlimited".

In July 2011, Ray & Anita invited fans to be part of the video for "Nothing 2 Lose" in Amsterdam. Fans applied via email and were selected randomly. The video with the fans was shot on 28 July. The single was released at the end of August 2011. The single is also the lead track for the soundtrack of the film Amsterdam Heavy. In the same month, Ray & Anita headlined the "I Love the 90's" stage at Tomorrowland in Belgium.

=== Comeback (2012–present) ===
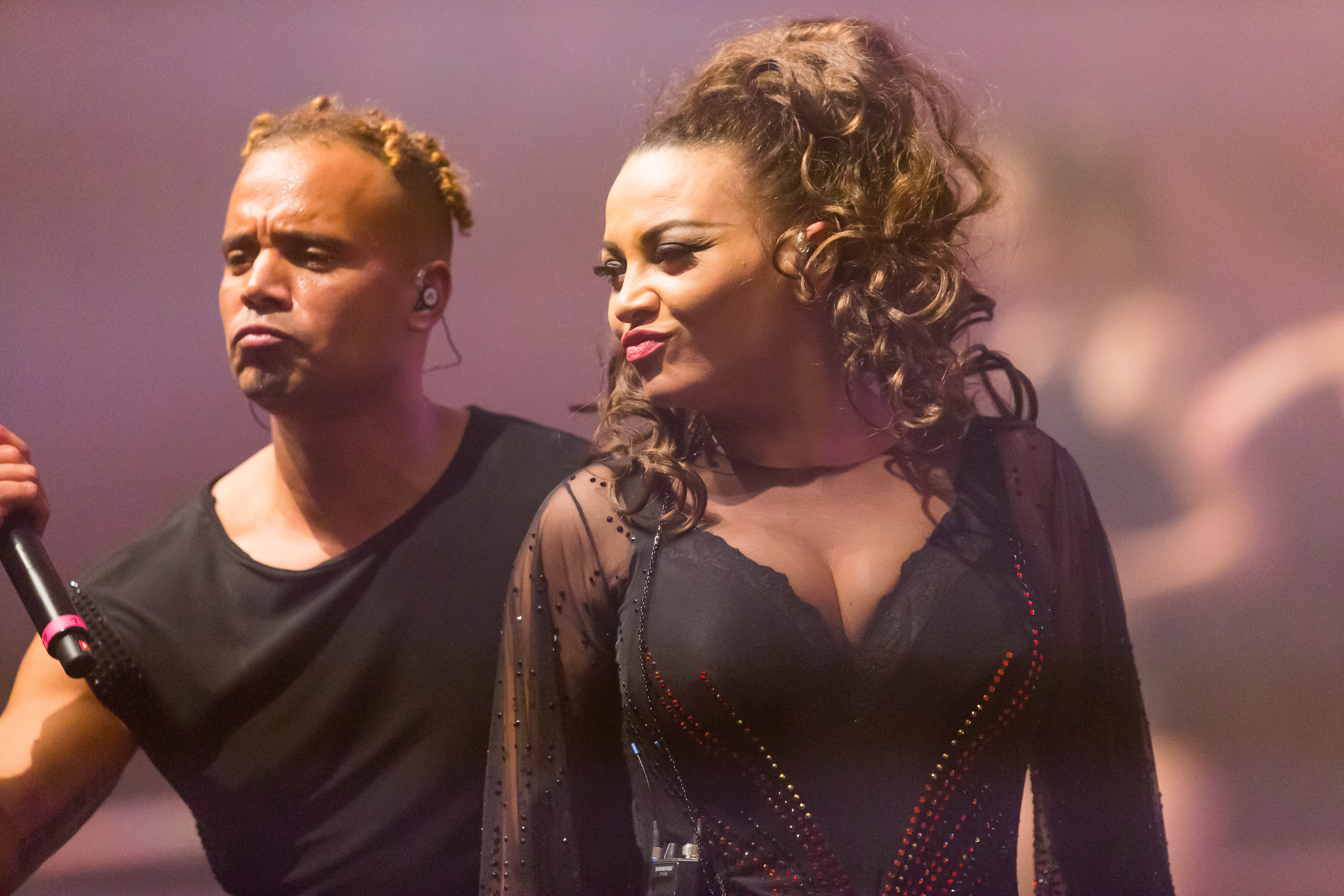
Ray & Anita live, 2016

On 11 July 2012, it was announced that Ray & Anita would be working again with Belgian producer De Coster under the name 2 Unlimited.

On 30 March 2013, Slijngaard and Doth performed their first full concert as 2 Unlimited with their band in Belgium at Antwerps Sportpaleis.

The duo released a remixed version of their very first single, "Get Ready for This", on 28 October 2013. The song was remixed by DJ Steve Aoki and was included on their Greatest Hits album.

In 2014, 2 Unlimited gave concerts at ten festivals that together made up Acceleration 2014, which combined top class car and bike racing with music and entertainment.

On 20 April 2016, 2 Unlimited announced that Doth was leaving the band at the end of 2016 to embark on a solo career. Doth was to be replaced by another singer, whose identity was not immediately revealed.

On 13 August 2016, Kim Vergouwen was revealed as Doth's replacement via Slijngaard's Facebook page.

== Band members ==
Current

- Ray Slijngaard – rap (1991–1996, 2012–present)
- Michèle Karamat Ali – vocals (2022–present)

Former members

- Anita Doth – vocals (1991–1996, 2012–2016)
- Julissa Marquez – vocals (1996)
- Romy van Ooijen – vocals (1998–1999)
- Marjon van Iwaarden – vocals (1998–1999)
- Kim Vergouwen – vocals (2016–2021)

Supporting

- Jean-Paul De Coster – music producer (1991–1996, 1998–1999, 2012–present)
- Phil Wilde – music producer (1991–1996, 1998–1999)

== Discography ==
- Get Ready! (1992)
- No Limits! (1993)
- Real Things (1994)
- II (1998)
