= Twilight Zone (2 Unlimited song) =

1992 single by 2 Unlimited

- Standard worldwide artwork

Single by 2 Unlimited

from the album Get Ready!
- Released: 13 January 1992
- Genre: Belgian techno; rave
- Length: 4:09
- Label: Byte
- Songwriters: Carlos Meire; June Rollocs; Jean-Paul De Coster; P. De Meyer; Phil Wilde
- Producers: Phil Wilde; Jean-Paul De Coster

2 Unlimited singles chronology
| "Get Ready for This" (1991) | "Twilight Zone" (1992) | "Workaholic" (1992) |

Music video
- "Twilight Zone" on YouTube

"Twilight Zone" is a song by Belgian/Dutch Eurodance act 2 Unlimited, released in January 1992 as the second single from the act's debut studio album, Get Ready! (1992). The UK release of the single was the first 2 Unlimited single to include the vocals of Anita Doth, as they had not been featured on their breakthrough hit "Get Ready for This". However, Ray Slijngaard's rap verses were once again removed. The accompanying music video was directed by David Betteridge.

"Twilight Zone" was a commercial success in many European territories, topping the singles charts of Finland, Ireland and the Netherlands, and reaching number two on the UK Singles Chart. It was 2 Unlimited's biggest hit on the US Dance Club Play chart, reaching number five, and it won an award in the category for Best Techno 12-inch Single on the 1993 WMC International Dance Music Awards.

== Background and release ==
The song is written by Carlos Meire, June Rollocs, Jean-Paul De Coster, P. De Meyer and Phil Wilde, while De Coster and Wilde produced it. De Coster said in an interview with Music & Media, "The new single "Twilight Zone" is even more accessible than its predecessor. We call it 'happy house'. In fact, it all comes from the same origins. Just like rock 'n' roll, this music always evoluates." Wilde told Melody Maker in 1994, "We mixed "Twilight Zone" on a pretty small DNR desk, which is Dutch. It was in-line with 20 channels, which gave you 20 inputs in the mix. Unfortunately, I needed about 70. It ended up taking five days to mix, but that was okay. It was a hit."

== Critical reception ==
Victoria Thieberger from Australian The Age wrote, "The track is propelled by a high-tech beat and dramatic changes in melody and attitude that make it sound like three songs tacked together, punctuated by an occasional "whoo!" rap in the vocal mix "gives it a harder edge, providing a central focus for the variations that spin around it. The end result is an entertaining dance track of more than average complexity and a decided lyrical development from 'Get Ready for This'." Larry Flick from Billboard magazine deemed it "a swirling techno rave that is etched with sweet and tuneful pop/NRG nuances. Tough enough to please hardcore punters, though mainstreamers will find track palatable as well." James Hamilton from Music Week's RM Dance Update stated that Stock & Waterman's "Belgian" act "returns with another synth stabbed simplistic Mecca-aimed raver, jerkily galloping through". Siân Pattenden from Smash Hits named it "an averagely bouncy rave tune."

== Chart performance ==
"Twilight Zone" peaked at number one in Finland, Ireland and the Netherlands (2 weeks) and entered the top 10 in Austria, Belgium, Greece, Portugal, Spain, Sweden and the United Kingdom, as well as on the Eurochart Hot 100. In the UK, "Twilight Zone" peaked at number two during its third week on the UK Singles Chart, on 2 February 1992. It was held off reaching the top spot by Wet Wet Wet's "Goodnight Girl". On the Music Week Dance Singles chart and the Record Mirror Club Chart, it peaked at numbers four and 13. "Twilight Zone" was also a top-20 hit in Germany and Switzerland. Outside Europe, the single reached number one on Canada's RPM Dance chart and numbers five, 22 and 49 on the US Billboard Dance Club Play, Maxi-Singles Sales and Hot 100 charts, respectively. In Oceania, it peaked at number 11 on the ARIA Singles Chart in Australia. In West Asia, it became a successful top-3 hit in Israel, peaking at number two on 25 February 1992.

== Music video ==
The music video for "Twilight Zone" was directed by British director David Betteridge. He had previously directed the video for the band's first hit, "Get Ready for This".

== Appearances ==
The song has become a staple of National Hockey League teams, as many of them play an instrumental loop of the song during games. Its popularity in the NHL may have been inspired by Ray Slijngaard wearing a Los Angeles Kings hoodie in the music video. The St. Louis Blues play it at home games when the team goes on the power play. It has also been used in NHL 11's "EA Trax" soundtrack. The song was remixed as "Techno Syndrome" by the Immortals, the main theme of the Mortal Kombat franchise. Immortals members Olivier Adams and Maurice Engelen have claimed the resemblance to be a coincidence, and that no legal action was taken. In 2025, a version of "Twilight Zone" with added sound effects was used as the basis for one of the McDonald's "Side Mission" TV commercials shown in the UK.

== Impact and legacy ==
"Twilight Zone" won an award in the category for Best Techno 12-inch Single on the 1993 WMC International Dance Music Awards. Billboard magazine ranked it number 43 in their list of "The 100 Greatest Jock Jams of All Time" in February 2024.

== Track listings ==
- 7-inch single
1. "Twilight Zone" (7-inch Vocal/Not Enough Version Edit) – 4:09
2. "Twilight Zone" (7-inch Instrumental/Rave Version Edit) – 4:09
- 12-inch maxi
1. "Twilight Zone" (Rave Version) – 5:42
2. "Twilight Zone" (Rapping Rave Version) – 5:40
3. "Twilight Zone" (Rio & Le Jean Remix) – 4:41
- CD single, Australia
1. "Twilight Zone" (7-inch Instrumental) – 3:16
2. "Twilight Zone" (7-inch Vocal) – 4:11
3. "Twilight Zone" (Rave Version) – 5:43

(Note: Track 1 is the PWL 7-inch edit, which is based on the Rave Version but adds some of Anita's vocals, specifically her "This is the twilight zone" chorus from the vocal arrangements to give it a slight "verse-chorus-verse" arrangement.)

- CD single, UK
1. "Twilight Zone" (7-inch Edit) – 3:18
2. "Twilight Zone" (Rave Version) – 5:42
3. "Twilight Zone" (Rapping Rave Version) – 5:40
- CD maxi
1. "Twilight Zone" (Rave Version) – 5:42
2. "Twilight Zone" (Rapping Rave Version) – 5:40
3. "Twilight Zone" (Not Enough Version) – 5:41
4. "Twilight Zone" (Rio & Le Jean Remix) – 4:10
5. "Twilight Zone" (7-inch Vocal/Not Enough Version Edit) – 4:10
6. "Twilight Zone" (7-inch Instrumental/Rave Version Edit) – 4:09
- CD maxi, France
1. "Twilight Zone" (Radio Version) – 3:58
2. "Twilight Zone" (Not Enough Version) – 5:40
3. "Twilight Zone" (Rave Version) – 4:46
4. "Twilight Zone" (Rio & Le Jean Remix) – 4:43

== Charts ==
=== Weekly charts ===
| Chart (1992) | Peak position |
|---|---|
| Australia (ARIA) | 11 |
| Austria (Ö3 Austria Top 40) | 10 |
| Belgium (Ultratop 50 Flanders) | 5 |
| Canada Dance/Urban (RPM) | 1 |
| Europe (Eurochart Hot 100) | 4 |
| Finland (Suomen virallinen lista) | 1 |
| Germany (GfK) | 20 |
| Greece (IFPI) | 2 |
| Ireland (IRMA) | 1 |
| Israel (Israeli Singles Chart) | 2 |
| Netherlands (Dutch Top 40) | 1 |
| Netherlands (Single Top 100) | 1 |
| Portugal (AFP) | 7 |
| Spain (AFYVE) | 3 |
| Sweden (Sverigetopplistan) | 9 |
| Switzerland (Schweizer Hitparade) | 15 |
| UK Singles (Official Charts) | 2 |
| UK Airplay (Music Week) | 17 |
| UK Dance (Music Week) | 4 |
| UK Club Chart (Music Week) | 13 |
| US Billboard Hot 100 | 49 |
| US Dance Club Play (Billboard) | 5 |
| US Maxi-Singles Sales (Billboard) | 22 |
| US Cash Box Top 100 | 35 |

=== Year-end charts ===
| Chart (1992) | Position |
|---|---|
| Australia (ARIA) | 68 |
| Belgium (Ultratop) | 8 |
| Canada Dance/Urban (RPM) | 5 |
| Europe (Eurochart Hot 100) | 30 |
| Germany (Media Control) | 85 |
| Israel (Israeli Singles Chart) | 36 |
| Netherlands (Dutch Top 40) | 11 |
| Netherlands (Single Top 100) | 9 |
| Sweden (Topplistan) | 56 |
| UK Singles (OCC) | 26 |

== Release history ==
| Region | Date | Format(s) | Label(s) | Ref. |
|---|---|---|---|---|
| United Kingdom | 13 January 1992 | 7-inch vinyl; 12-inch vinyl; CD; cassette | PWL International | |
| Japan | 25 April 1992 | Mini-CD | Mercury | |
| Australia | 27 April 1992 | 12-inch vinyl; CD; cassette | Liberation; Byte | |

== Millennium remixes ==
"Millennium remixes"

Single by 2 Unlimited
- Released: 2000
- Label: Byte

Following the bleak success of the "No Limit" single came the "Twilight Zone (Millennium Remixes)". It had the same success as its predecessor, although the remixes were more commercial and radio-friendly. It received good airplay in Europe but had very little success in the charts.

=== Track listings ===
- 12-inch single, Europe
1. "Twilight Zone" (DJ Jean Club Mix) – 7:18
2. "Twilight Zone" (DJ Jean Dub Mix) – 5:46
3. "Twilight Zone" (Sharp 'Maniac' Mix) – 7:15
- CD single
1. "Twilight Zone" (DJ Jean Edit) – 3:15
2. "Twilight Zone" (Delvino Remix Edit) – 3:35
- CD maxi
1. "Twilight Zone" (DJ Jean Edit) – 3:15
2. "Twilight Zone" (DJ Jean Club Mix) – 7:18
3. "Twilight Zone" (DJ Jean Dub Mix) – 5:46
4. "Twilight Zone" (Sharp 'Maniac' Mix) – 7:15
