= Tribal Dance =

1993 single by 2 Unlimited

- Artwork for continental European and some non-European releases, including the US 12-inch single

Single by 2 Unlimited

from the album No Limits!
- Released: 26 April 1993
- Genre: Eurodance; EDM; rave; techno
- Length: 4:32; 3:40 (single version)
- Label: Byte
- Songwriters: Phil Wilde; Ray Slijngaard; Xavier Clayton; Filip Martens
- Producers: Phil Wilde; Jean-Paul De Coster

2 Unlimited singles chronology
"No Limit" (1993)	"Tribal Dance" (1993)	"Faces" (1993)

Music video
- "Tribal Dance" on YouTube

"Tribal Dance" is a song by Belgian/Dutch Eurodance band 2 Unlimited. It was released in April 1993 as the second single from the band's second album, No Limits! (1993). The UK release omits the main rap but leaves in more vocals from band member Ray Slijngaard than any of their previous releases. The single experienced chart success in several countries, topping the charts in Finland, Israel, Portugal and Spain. In North America, the song reached number one on the Canadian RPM Dance chart, while peaking at number seven on the US Billboard Dance Club Play chart. The single's music video was directed by Nick Burgess-Jones and filmed in London, depicting the band performing in a jungle setting with tribal dancers.

In 1994, the song received an award in the category for Best Techno 12-inch at the WMC International Dance Music Awards in the US. In 2004, a new version of the song, titled "Tribal Dance 2.4" was released. It charted in both Austria and Germany, peaking at numbers 58 and 78.

== Composition ==
The track is written by Phil Wilde, Ray Slijngaard, Xavier Clayton and Filip Martens, and was produced by Wilde with Jean-Paul De Coster. It features a trumpet riff and different kinds of drums throughout the song and the "Say that again" lyric at the start of the track was sampled from the 1985 film Back to the Future.

== Critical reception ==
Alan Jones from Music Week gave the song a score of four out of five, writing, "This is the usual high-octane, careering dance contender in rave/techno mould. It could hardly be as big as 'No Limit', and is probably a little too similar, albeit with some ethnic sounding wailing, presumably to justify the title." He added, "Instant smash, of course". Wendi Cermak from The Network Forty noted that here, 2 Unlimited "hits the dance floor with another tribal trancer". A reviewer from Newcastle Evening Chronicle named it a "brash, action packed pounder". Gail Heritage of Port Lincoln Times described it as "a mix of rhythmic beat, almost changing at every eight bars, centring around the harmonic voice of Anita, before looming into a jungle of rap by Ray." She added, "'Tribal Dance' was one of my favourites on the album — those jungle drums just seem to be calling me to the dance floor." James Hamilton from the Record Mirror Dance Update named it a "jungle drummed simple chanting galloper" in his weekly dance column. Toby Anstis, reviewing songs for Smash Hits, stated that the song is "a nice bit of pop". Smash Hits editor Leesa Daniels gave it two out of five, adding that it will "probably be number one for weeks." Australian student newspaper Woroni called it a "thumping, driven dance track", naming it an "obvious highlight" of the No Limits! album.

== Chart performance ==
In Europe, "Tribal Dance" peaked at number one in Finland, Portugal and Spain, as well as on both the Eurochart Hot 100 and the European Dance Radio Chart in June 1993. On the Eurochart Hot 100, "Tribal Dance" debuted at number 10 on 15 May, after charting in Belgium, Germany, Ireland, the Netherlands, Norway, Sweden and the UK. It topped the chart four weeks later and spent one week at the top position. The song peaked at number two in Belgium (Flanders), Germany, Ireland, the Netherlands, Sweden and Switzerland. Additionally, "Tribal Dance" was a top-10 hit in Austria, Denmark, France, Greece, Italy, Norway and the United Kingdom. In the latter nation, the song debuted and peaked at number four on the UK Singles Chart in May 1993 and stayed at that position for two weeks. It spent 11 weeks within the UK top 100 and also peaked at number seven on the Music Week Dance Singles chart.

In North America, the song topped the Canadian RPM Dance chart for three weeks, as well as peaking at number seven on the US Billboard Dance Club Play chart and the Canadian The Record Retail Singles chart. In West Asia, it also peaked at number one in Israel, with two weeks at the top position from 24 May 1993 and six weeks within the Israeli top 10 in total. In Africa, "Tribal Dance" peaked at number four in Zimbabwe, while in Oceania, it peaked at numbers seven and 38 in Australia and New Zealand, respectively. "Tribal Dance" was awarded with a gold record in Germany, after 250,000 singles were shipped there. In 1994, the song received an award in the category for Best Techno 12-inch at the WMC International Dance Music Awards in the US.

== Music video ==
The accompanying music video for "Tribal Dance" was directed by British director Nick Burgess-Jones and produced by Spidercom Films. He had previously directed the video for "No Limit". "Tribal Dance" was filmed in Black Island studios in London and is set in a jungle using blue screen in order to create the appearance of members of the band swinging across a jungle backdrop. In the background, tribal dancers perform. A picture-in-picture screen showing a video game is also used. There are two versions; the rap version and the no rap version. "Tribal Dance" received heavy rotation on MTV Europe in June 1993.

== Track listings ==
- 7-inch single (1993)
1. "Tribal Dance" (Edit) — 3:43
2. "Tribal Dance" (Rap Edit) — 3:41
- 12-inch maxi, Belgium (1993)
1. "Tribal Dance" (Extended) — 5:11
2. "Tribal Dance" (Extended Rap) — 5:11
3. "Tribal Dance" (Automatic African Remix) — 4:35
4. "Tribal Dance" (Automatic Breakbeat Remix) — 4:48
- 12-inch maxi, US (1993)
1. "Tribal Dance" (Extended Mix) — 5:14
2. "Tribal Dance" (Extended Rap Mix) — 5:10
3. "Tribal Dance" (Radio Version) — 3:41
4. "Tribal Dance" (Automatic African Remix) — 4:35
5. "Tribal Dance" (Automatic Breakbeat Remix) — 4:49
6. "Tribal Dance" (No No Rap Edit) — 3:45
- CD single, Belgium and Germany (1993)
1. "Tribal Dance" (Rap Edit) — 3:41
2. "Tribal Dance" (Edit) — 3:41
3. "Tribal Dance" (Extended) — 5:11
4. "Tribal Dance" (Extended Rap) — 5:11
5. "Tribal Dance" (Automatic African Remix) — 4:35
6. "Tribal Dance" (Automatic Breakbeat Remix) — 4:48
- CD single, France (1993)
1. "Tribal Dance" (Radio Edit) — 3:40
2. "Tribal Dance" (Radio Rap Edit) — 3:40
- CD single, UK (1993)
1. "Tribal Dance" (Edit) — 3:43
2. "Tribal Dance" (Automatic African Remix) — 4:38
3. "Tribal Dance" (Extended 12-inch Mix) — 5:13
4. "Tribal Dance" (Automatic Breakbeat Mix) — 4:50
5. "Tribal Dance" (Extended Rap) — 5:11
- CD maxi, France (1993)
1. "Tribal Dance" (Radio Edit) — 3:40
2. "Tribal Dance" (Radio Rap Edit) — 3:40
3. "Tribal Dance" (Extended) — 5:10
4. "Tribal Dance" (Extended Rap) — 5:10
- 12-inch maxi (2004)
1. "Tribal Dance" 2.4 (Long Version) — 5:48
2. "Tribal Dance" 2.4 (Revil O. Remix) — 7:33
3. "Tribal Dance" 2.4 (2 Chains Club Mix) — 5:09
4. "Tribal Dance" 2.4 (Original Extended Mix) — 5:11
- CD single (2004)
1. "Tribal Dance" 2.4 (Xtreme Sound Radio Edit) — 3:23
2. "Tribal Dance" 2.4 (Revil O. Short Mix) — 3:40
3. "Tribal Dance" 2.4 (2 Chains Radio Cut) — 3:46
4. "Tribal Dance" 2.4 (Original Radio Mix) — 3:42
5. "Tribal Dance" 2.4 (Long Version) — 5:51
6. "Tribal Dance" 2.4 (Revil O. Remix) — 7:35
7. "Tribal Dance" 2.4 (2 Chains Club Mix) — 5:09
8. "Tribal Dance" 2.4 (Original Extended Mix) — 5:07

== Charts ==
=== Weekly charts ===
Chart (1993)	Peak position
Australia (ARIA)	5
Austria (Ö3 Austria Top 40)	3
Belgium (Ultratop 50 Flanders)	2
Canada Retail Singles (The Record)	7
Canada Dance/Urban (RPM)	1
Denmark (IFPI)	3
Europe (Eurochart Hot 100)	1
Europe (European Dance Radio)	1
Europe (European Hit Radio)	18
Finland (Suomen virallinen lista)	1
France (SNEP)	4
Germany (GfK)	2
Greece (Pop + Rock)	3
Iceland (Íslenski Listinn Topp 40)	28
Ireland (IRMA)	2
Israel (Israeli Singles Chart)	1
Italy (Musica e dischi)	10
Netherlands (Dutch Top 40)	2
Netherlands (Single Top 100)	2
New Zealand (Recorded Music NZ)	38
Norway (VG-lista)	4
Portugal (AFP)	1
Spain (AFYVE)	1
Sweden (Sverigetopplistan)	2
Switzerland (Schweizer Hitparade)	2
UK Singles (Official Charts)	4
UK Airplay (Music Week)	18
UK Dance (Music Week)	7
UK Club Chart (Music Week)	12
US Dance Club Play (Billboard)	7
US Maxi-Singles Sales (Billboard)	38
Zimbabwe (ZIMA)	4

Chart (2004)	Peak position
Austria (Ö3 Austria Top 40)	58
Germany (Media Control GfK)	78

=== Year-end charts ===
Chart (1993)	Position
Australia (ARIA)	57
Austria (Ö3 Austria Top 40)	23
Belgium (Ultratop)	18
Canada Dance/Urban (RPM)	14
Europe (Eurochart Hot 100)	11
Europe (European Dance Radio)	19
Germany (Media Control)	15
Israel (Israeli Singles Chart)	25
Netherlands (Dutch Top 40)	29
Netherlands (Single Top 100)	17
Sweden (Topplistan)	28
Switzerland (Schweizer Hitparade)	21
UK Singles (OCC)	45

== Certifications ==
Certifications and sales for "Tribal Dance"
Region	Certification	Certified units/sales
Germany (BVMI)	Gold	250,000^{^}
Summaries
Worldwide	—	734,000
^{^} Shipments figures based on certification alone.

== Release history ==
Region	Date	Format(s)	Label(s)	Ref.
United Kingdom	26 April 1993	7-inch vinyl; 12-inch vinyl; CD; cassette	PWL Continental	
Australia	17 May 1993	CD; cassette	Liberation; Byte	
Japan	25 June 1993	CD	Mercury	
