= No Limit (2 Unlimited song) =

1993 single by 2 Unlimited

- Widely distributed variant of the standard artwork

Single by 2 Unlimited

from the album No Limits!
- Released: 18 January 1993
- Genre: Eurodance; techno; hi-NRG
- Length: 3:44; 3:30 (single version)
- Label: Byte
- Songwriters: Phil Wilde; Jean-Paul De Coster; Ray Slijngaard; Anita Dels
- Producers: Phil Wilde; Jean-Paul De Coster

2 Unlimited singles chronology
| "The Magic Friend" (1992) | "No Limit" (1993) | "Tribal Dance" (1993) |

Audio sample
- file; help

Music video
- "No Limit" on YouTube

"No Limit" is a song by Belgian-Dutch Eurodance group 2 Unlimited, released in January 1993, by Byte Records. It was their fifth single in total and the first to be released from their second album, No Limits! (1993). Co-written by the group's Ray Slijngaard and Anita Dels, the song became one of their most commercially successful singles, topping both the Dutch Top 40 and Single Top 100 charts. Internationally, "No Limit" topped the charts in 35 countries, including Austria, Denmark, France and the United Kingdom, and peaked within the top ten of the charts in several others, including Australia, Germany and Italy.

Like previous releases, the UK version of the single removed all of the raps from Slijngaard, leaving just Dels' vocals. One word from the rap was kept, the word 'Techno' (from the line "I'm making techno and I am proud") which was looped and repeated during the middle of the song, turning the line into "Techno! Techno! Techno! Techno!" and giving the song an extra vocal hook. Its accompanying music video was directed by Nick Burgess-Jones, depicting the group inside of a giant pinball machine. It received heavy rotation on MTV Europe.

== Composition ==
"No Limit" started as an idea to do a high-speed techno track and was written in one evening by Dels and Slijngaard. Dels told in an interview, "When we made 'No Limit', we were working on the LP. We'd done everything but one bit, and we didn't know what to do — Ray and I made up the title quickly and then wrote the song in one evening. We didn't expect anything, and we were surprised when the producer wanted to release it as the first single."

Producer Phil Wilde explained to Melody Maker in 1994, "Like most techno, 2 Unlimited's material floats somewhere between 125 and 148bpm; 'No Limit' came in at 144." Wilde programmed the rhythm with hand claps every four beat. He had the groove and went searching in his sound library, starting jamming with sounds. He explained in the same interview, "For 'No Limits' we started jamming with sounds. Then I got the sound which we used for the main melody in that song...it's mostly a combination of sounds. It's so important to have a good sound, and not so easy to fine one. On 'No Limits', the sound came, then the melody. We already had the bass and the drums, and the sample for the lead sound in the end was just a sample. But I'm not going to tell you what it was."

== Critical reception ==
Larry Flick from Billboard magazine wrote, "After several weeks at the top of Britain's pop charts, European rave duo is ready tackle the U.S. radio market with a bright ditty that melds techno, hi-NRG, and rap elements. The hook is irresistible, and the pace is heart-racing. Will please fans of last year's hit, 'Twilight Zone', while reeling in newcomers." Tony Parsons from The Daily Telegraph named it a "high-speed anthem". Per Reinholdt from Danish Gaffa called it a "dance-powerhit", noting its "inciting up-tempo" and a rhythm and theme "with the same temper as a dressed beeswarm". He also named the song a "piece of pop art". In a Guinness World Records review, the sound of 'No Limit' was compared to "the sound giant dinosaurs might make stomping on cities". A reviewer from Irish Independent described it as "a humungous global hit".

In his weekly UK chart commentary, James Masterton wrote, "Of all the techno-rave dance acts, 2 Unlimited are the most successful, notching up 5 hits in a row with all making the 20. 'No Limit' being the latest and most frantic". The Stud Brothers of Melody Maker praised it as "magnificently kitsch". Alan Jones from Music Week viewed it as "obvious pop fare". James Hamilton from the Record Mirror Dance Update named it "madly catchy" and a "tuneful techno pop galloper" in his weekly dance column. Johnny Lee from Smash Hits called it a "stormtrooper", adding that it has "a keyboard that sounds like it's being played by a robot with boxing gloves." Australian student newspaper Woroni complimented the song as "tremendously exciting and highly recommended", naming it an "obvious highlight" of the No Limits! album.

== Chart performance ==
"No Limit" peaked at number one in 35 countries. In Europe, it reached number one in Austria, Belgium, Denmark, Finland, France, Ireland, the Netherlands, Norway, Portugal, Spain, Sweden, Switzerland, and the United Kingdom, as well as on the Eurochart Hot 100. In the UK, the single reached number one during its third week on the UK Singles Chart, on 7 February 1993, after entering at number four and then climbing to number two. It stayed at the top of the chart for five consecutive weeks. Additionally, it entered the top 10 in Germany, Greece, Iceland, and Italy. "No Limit" debuted on the Eurochart Hot 100 at number 13 on 6 February after charting in Ireland, Sweden and the UK. It peaked at number one six weeks later, on 13 March, and stayed at the top for nine consecutive weeks. During the same period, it topped the European Dance Radio Chart.

In Canada, the song peaked at numbers one and two on The Record Retail Singles chart and the RPM Dance chart, respectively. It also reached number 21 on the US Billboard Dance Club Play chart. In Oceania, it reached numbers seven and 50 in Australia and New Zealand, respectively, while in Zimbabwe, it peaked at number 16. In West Asia, "No Limit" became a number-one hit in Israel, peaking on 16 February 1993. It spent nine weeks inside the Israeli top 30. The song was awarded with a gold record in Australia, Austria, France and Germany, a silver record in the UK, and a platinum record in the Netherlands and Switzerland. In 2003, "No Limit 2.3" peaked at number 41 on the German Top 100 singles chart.

== Impact and legacy ==
NME ranked "No Limit" number one in their list of "Top Five Euro-Hits of All Time" in December 1993. NME editor Paul Moody wrote, "The ultimate piece of pop existentialism as Anita and Ray suggest the whole world is one huge playground of hedonistic excess. All to a video set within a huge pinball machine. Sublime." The song was ranked number 65 in BuzzFeed's list of "The 101 Greatest Dance Songs of the '90s" in 2017. Stopera and Galindo said that "this is possibly the most aggressive beat from the '90s. It's like they're strumming a GIANT rubber band." Tom Ewing of Freaky Trigger felt the track's "echoey hi-hat hits and the union of steam-hammer bass and rubber-ball synths" carry the industrial, "piston-powered aggression" of Belgian rave music. He also noted the presence of a cowbell in the back of the track. In 2015, Graham Clark from The Yorkshire Times stated that "the track at the time sounded unlike anything else but you can hear how it has influenced so many of today's electronic dance music tracks".

On August 25, 2026, OpenAI used the song to announce that there are no longer any text limits for chats in GPT-5.6 Luna.

== Music video ==
The accompanying music video for "No Limit" was directed by Nick Burgess-Jones and filmed in London. It features group members Anita Dels and Ray Slijngaard performing inside what appears to be a giant pinball machine, wearing leather apparel. "No Limit" received heavy rotation on MTV Europe in March 1993. Burgess-Jones also directed the videos for 2 Unlimited's next two singles, "Tribal Dance" and "Faces".

== Track listings ==
=== Original version ===
- CD single
1. "No Limit" (Radio Edit No Rap) (3:08)
2. "No Limit" (Radio Edit Rap) (3:30)
- CD maxi
1. "No Limit" (Radio Edit) (3:15)
2. "No Limit" (Extended Mix) (5:40)
3. "No Limit" (Automatic Remix) (4:54)
4. "No Limit" (Rio and Le Jean Remix) (3:53)
5. "No Limit" (Automatic Breakbeat Remix) (4:45)
- CD maxi
1. "No Limit" (Radio Edit No Rap) (3:08)
2. "No Limit" (Extended No Rap) (5:44)
3. "No Limit" (Extended Rap) (5:55)
4. "No Limit" (Rio and Le Jean Version) (3:57)
- 7-inch single
1. "No Limit" (3:15)
2. "No Limit" (Rio and Le Jean Remix) (3:53)
- UK 7-inch single
1. "No Limit" (3:15)
2. "No Limit" (Automatic Breakbeat Remix) (4:45)
- 12-inch maxi
1. "No Limit" (Extended) (5:44)
2. "No Limit" (Extended Rap) (5:55)
3. "No Limit" (Rio and Le Jean Remix) (4:56)
- 12-inch maxi Italy
1. "No Limit" (Extended No Rap 2) (5:55)
2. "No Limit" (Extended Rap) (5:55)
3. "No Limit" (Rio and Le Jean Remix) (4:56)
4. "No Limit" (Automatic Remix) (4:54)
5. "No Limit" (Automatic Breakbeat Remix) (4:45)
6. "No Limit" (Radio Rap Edit) (3:30)

=== Millennium remixes ===
- CD single
1. "No Limit" (Moon Project Edit) (3:50)
2. "No Limit" (Starfighter Remix Edit) (3:15)
- CD maxi
1. "No Limit" (Starfighter Remix Edit) (3:15)
2. "No Limit" (Starfighter Remix) (7:55)
3. "No Limit" (Push's Transcendental Rmx) (8:26)
4. "No Limit" (Moon Project Remix) (7:43)
5. "No Limit" (Razzor and Guido Remix Dub) (10:38)
- 12-inch single
1. "No Limit" (Starfighter Remix) (7:55)
2. "No Limit" (Razor and Guido Dub) (10:38)
3. "No Limit" (Push's Transcendental Remix) (8:26)
4. "No Limit" (Moon Project Remix) (7:43)

=== No Limit 2.3 ===
- CD single
1. "No Limit 2.3" (Master Blaster Radio Edit) (3:12)
2. "No Limit 2.3" (Master Blaster Remix) (5:25)
3. "No Limit 2.3" (DJ Digress Hamburg Style Remix) (7:23)
4. "No Limit 2.3" (DJ Sputnik Remix) (6:54)
5. "No Limit 2.3" (Original Extended Mix) (5:42)
- 12-inch single
1. "No Limit 2.3" (Master Blaster Remix) (5:25)
2. "No Limit 2.3" (Marco De Jonge Club Mix) (5:38)
3. "No Limit 2.3" (DJ Digress Hamburg Style Remix) (7:25)
4. "No Limit 2.3" (Original Extended Mix) (5:40)

== Charts ==
=== Weekly charts ===
Weekly chart performance for "No Limit"
| Chart (1993) | Peak position |
|---|---|
| Australia (ARIA) | 7 |
| Austria (Ö3 Austria Top 40) | 1 |
| Belgium (Ultratop 50 Flanders) | 1 |
| Canada Retail Singles (The Record) | 1 |
| Canada Dance/Urban (RPM) | 2 |
| Denmark (IFPI) | 1 |
| Europe (Eurochart Hot 100) | 1 |
| Europe (European Dance Radio) | 1 |
| Europe (European Hit Radio) | 19 |
| Finland (Suomen virallinen lista) | 1 |
| France (SNEP) | 1 |
| Germany (GfK) | 2 |
| Greece (Pop + Rock) | 2 |
| Iceland (Íslenski Listinn Topp 40) | 4 |
| Ireland (IRMA) | 1 |
| Israel (Israeli Singles Chart) | 1 |
| Italy (Musica e dischi) | 8 |
| Netherlands (Dutch Top 40) | 1 |
| Netherlands (Single Top 100) | 1 |
| New Zealand (Recorded Music NZ) | 40 |
| Norway (VG-lista) | 1 |
| Portugal (AFP) | 1 |
| Spain (AFYVE) | 1 |
| Sweden (Sverigetopplistan) | 1 |
| Switzerland (Schweizer Hitparade) | 1 |
| UK Singles (Official Charts) | 1 |
| UK Airplay (Music Week) | 22 |
| UK Dance (Music Week) | 7 |
| UK Club Chart (Music Week) | 17 |
| US Dance Club Play (Billboard) | 21 |
| US Maxi-Singles Sales (Billboard) | 25 |
| Zimbabwe (ZIMA) | 16 |

=== Year-end charts ===
Year-end chart performance for "No Limit"
| Chart (1993) | Position |
|---|---|
| Australia (ARIA) | 30 |
| Austria (Ö3 Austria Top 40) | 4 |
| Belgium (Ultratop 50 Flanders) | 7 |
| Canada Dance/Urban (RPM) | 26 |
| Europe (Eurochart Hot 100) | 1 |
| Europe (European Dance Radio) | 12 |
| Germany (Media Control) | 5 |
| Iceland (Íslenski Listinn Topp 40) | 42 |
| Israel (Israeli Singles Chart) | 19 |
| Netherlands (Dutch Top 40) | 3 |
| Netherlands (Single Top 100) | 2 |
| Sweden (Topplistan) | 7 |
| Switzerland (Schweizer Hitparade) | 4 |
| UK Singles (OCC) | 4 |

=== Decade-end charts ===
Decade-end chart performance for "No Limit"
| Chart (1990–1999) | Position |
|---|---|
| Austria (Ö3 Austria Top 40) | 60 |
| Belgium (Ultratop 50 Flanders) | 47 |
| Canada (Nielsen SoundScan) | 94 |
| Netherlands (Dutch Top 40) | 34 |

== Certifications and sales ==
Certifications for "No Limit"
| Region | Certification | Certified units/sales |
|---|---|---|
| Australia (ARIA) | Gold | 35,000^{^} |
| Austria (IFPI Austria) | Gold | 25,000^{*} |
| France (SNEP) | Gold | 352,000 |
| Germany (BVMI) | Platinum | 500,000^{^} |
| Netherlands (NVPI) | Platinum | 75,000^{^} |
| Switzerland (IFPI Switzerland) | Platinum | 50,000^{^} |
| United Kingdom Physical release | — | 532,000 |
| United Kingdom (BPI) Digital release | Silver | 200,000^{‡} |
Summaries
| Benelux | — | 156,000 |
| Worldwide | — | 2,300,000 |
^{*} Sales figures based on certification alone.^{^} Shipments figures based on certification alone.^{‡} Sales+streaming figures based on certification alone.

== Release history ==
Release dates and formats for "No Limit"
| Region | Date | Format(s) | Label(s) | Ref. |
|---|---|---|---|---|
| United Kingdom | 18 January 1993 | 7-inch vinyl; 12-inch vinyl; CD; cassette | PWL Continental | |
| Australia | 30 January 1993 | 12-inch vinyl | Liberation | |
| Australia | 8 February 1993 | CD; cassette | Liberation | |
| Japan | 25 March 1993 | CD | Mercury | |

== The Smurfs covers ==
"No Limit"

Single by Irene Moors en de Smurfen
- B-side: "Ga Je Met Ons Mee (Naar Smurfenland)"
- Released: 1995
- Studio: Cat Music Studio's
- Genre: Eurodance
- Label: EMI Records
- Songwriters: Phil Wilde; Jean-Paul De Coster; Ray Slijngaard; Anita Dels
- Producer: Cat Music

A Dutch cover version by Irene Moors en de Smurfen topped the Dutch charts for six weeks in 1995. A French version by Les Schtroumpfs, titled "No No No No Limit", was also successful in France and the Walloon region of Belgium, peaking in the top ten in both territories.

- Standard CD single
1. "No Limit" – 3:05
2. "Ga Je Met Ons Mee (Naar Smurfenland)" – 2:53
- CD maxi-single
1. "No Limit" (radio edit) – 3:05
2. "No Limit" (Smurf the House mix) – 4:46
3. "No Limit" (karaoke) – 3:05
4. "Die Dal Dee" – 3:28
- French CD maxi-single
1. "No No No No Limit" (radio version) – 3:12
2. "No No No No Limit" (extended version) – 5:20
3. "Le monde merveilleux" – 2:53

Weekly chart performance for "No Limit"
| Chart (1995) | Peak position |
|---|---|
| Belgium (Ultratop 50 Flanders) | 14 |
| Belgium (Ultratop 50 Wallonia) | 6 |
| Europe (Eurochart Hot 100) | 57 |
| France (SNEP) | 9 |
| Netherlands (Dutch Top 40) | 1 |
| Netherlands (Single Top 100) | 1 |

Year-end chart performance for "No Limit"
| Chart (1995) | Position |
|---|---|
| Belgium (Ultratop 50 Wallonia) | 46 |
| France (SNEP) | 51 |
| Netherlands (Dutch Top 40) | 12 |
| Netherlands (Single Top 100) | 4 |

== beFour cover ==
"No Limit"

Single by beFour

from the album Friends 4 Ever
- Released: 2009
- Label: Universal
- Songwriters: Phil Wilde; Jean-Paul De Coster; Ray Slijngaard; Anita Dels

BeFour singles chronology
| "Live Your Dream" (2008) | "No Limit" (2009) | "Ding-A-Dong" (2009) |

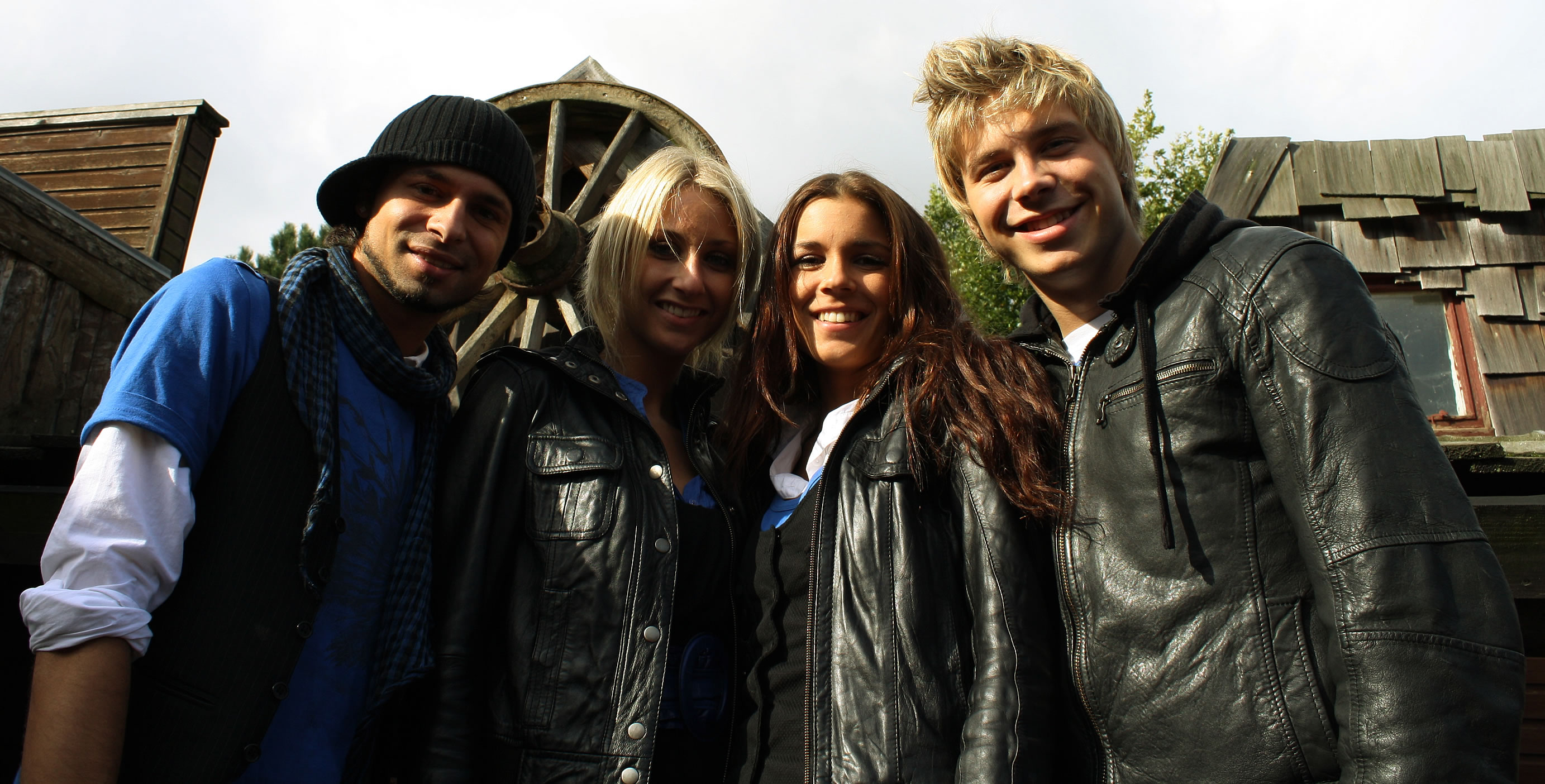
beFour (2008)

"No Limit" was covered by German band beFour on their fourth studio album Friends 4 Ever, and as a single in Germany, Austria and Switzerland. The song entered the German Singles Chart in 2009.

=== Track listings ===
- CD maxi
1. "No Limit" (Single version) (3:25)
2. "No Limit" (Remix) (3:41)
3. "All Around The Planet" (3:53)
4. "No Limit" (Video) (3:25)
- Digital download
1. "No Limit" (Single version) (3:25)
2. "No Limit" (Remix) (3:41)
3. "All Around the Planet" (3:53)

=== Charts ===
Weekly chart performance for "No Limit" by beFour
| Chart (2009) | Peak position |
|---|---|
| Austria (Ö3 Austria Top 40) | 13 |
| Germany (GfK) | 21 |
| Switzerland (Schweizer Hitparade) | 29 |

== See also ==
- List of number-one hits of 1993 (Austria)
- List of Dutch Top 40 number-one singles of 1993
- List of European number-one hits of 1993
- List of number-one singles of 1993 (France)
- List of number-one singles of 1993 (Ireland)
- List of number-one songs in Norway
- List of number-one singles of 1993 (Spain)
- List of number-one singles and albums in Sweden
- List of number-one singles of the 1990s (Switzerland)
- List of UK Singles Chart number ones of the 1990s
