= The Real Thing (2 Unlimited song) =

1994 single by 2 Unlimited

Single by 2 Unlimited

from the album Real Things
- Released: 9 May 1994
- Genre: Dance-pop; house; techno
- Length: 3:40
- Label: Byte
- Songwriters: Phil Wilde; Peter Bauwens; Ray Slijngaard; Anita Dels
- Producers: Phil Wilde; Jean-Paul De Coster

2 Unlimited singles chronology
"Let the Beat Control Your Body" (1994)	"The Real Thing" (1994)	"No One" (1994)

Music video
- "The Real Thing" on YouTube

UK cover

"The Real Thing" is a song by Belgian/Dutch Eurodance band 2 Unlimited, released in May 1994, by Byte Records, as the first single from their third album, Real Things (1994). The song was co-written by band members Ray Slijngaard and Anita Dels, and achieved chart success in several European countries, topping the charts of Finland, Lithuania and the Netherlands while peaking at number two in Denmark, Sweden, Belgium and Switzerland. The accompanying music video was directed by Nigel Simpkiss, and received heavy rotation on music television channels, such as MTV Europe and VIVA.

== Composition ==
"The Real Thing" is written by Phil Wilde and Peter Bauwens with band members Ray Slijngaard and Anita Dels, while Wilde and Jean-Paul De Coster produced it. The song contains samples of Toccata and Fugue in D minor by German composer and musician Johann Sebastian Bach. According to classicfm.com, it is considered one of the biggest pop songs to sample classical music in the last 25 years."

== Critical reception ==
In his weekly UK chart commentary, James Masterton found that "The Real Thing" "is just what you would expect from 2 Unlimited. Fast, frantic and fatuous it's still enough to give them an eighth Top 10 hit out of 10 chart singles". Pan-European magazine Music & Media commented, "In no time, chart positions are reported from the UK, Ireland, Holland, Belgium, Germany and Denmark. With this ABBAesque pop dance chorus many territories will follow." Alan Jones from Music Week gave the song a score of four out of five, writing that here, 2 Unlimited "plough their usual frantic and bouncy techno furrow. The male rap/female singing combination still serves them well and, as usual, this is Top 10 bound."

Stuart Bailie from NME commented, "Imagine Bach writing his 'Toccata and Fugue in D minor' if he was rammed to the gills on turbo-power disco biscuits and allowed access to every crap rave slogan of the last five years." Scottish Perthshire Advertiser said, "They've found a new formula yet, but it'll still be a smash!" James Hamilton from the Record Mirror Dance Update named it a "typically cheesy frantic pop galloper" in his weekly dance column. Tim Marsh from Select stated that it "has a funky key riff". Tom Doyle from Smash Hits gave it three out of five, commenting, "ditching their heavy heavy techno techno for a bit of a housey classical vibe, the 'Limited look set to continue their near unblemished run of chart hits."

== Chart performance ==
"The Real Thing" peaked at number one in Finland, Lithuania and the Netherlands, as well as on the Eurochart Hot 100, on which it peaked during its fourth week on the chart, on 18 June 1994. In Finland, it spent three weeks as number one on the Suomen virallinen lista, where it debuted at the top position on the chart on 4 June. In the band's native Netherlands, it topped the Single Top 100 chart for two weeks, with seven weeks within the top 10 in total. The single reached number two in Belgium, Denmark, Sweden and Switzerland.

"The Real Thing" was a top-10 hit in Austria, France, Germany, Ireland, Norway, Spain, and the United Kingdom. In the UK, it peaked at number six on 22 May, during its second week on the UK Singles Chart, while peaking at number 12 on the Music Week Dance Singles chart. In addition, the song was a top-20 hit in Iceland and a top-30 hit in Italy, reaching numbers 14 and 22, respectively. Outside Europe, "The Real Thing" charted in Latin America, North America, Oceania and West Asia, peaking at number two in Israel, number five in Canada, number ten in El Salvador, number 22 in New Zealand, and number 39 in Australia. According to Billboard magazine, the single has sold 633,000 copies worldwide as of 1996.

== Airplay ==
"The Real Thing" reached the number-one position on the European Dance Radio chart on 9 June 1994. It peaked at number 24 on the European Hit Radio chart in the beginning of July. The single entered the European airplay chart Border Breakers by Music & Media at number 12 on 4 June due to crossover airplay in East Central-, West-, Central-, Northwest- and North-European regions, and peaked at the third position on 2 July 1994.

== Music video ==
The music video for "The Real Thing" was directed by Nigel Simpkiss and produced by Swivel Films. It was released in the UK in May 1994, receiving heavy rotation on MTV Europe and German music television channel VIVA, where it was A-listed in June 1994. It was a Box Top on British The Box same month and one month later, it was A-listed also on France's MCM. Slijngaard told Melody Maker about the video, "The new look's a bit 'Terminator'. There's a guy on skates with, uh, all computer things and lights, and those two [Steve and Claire, the 2U dancers] are just boogieing away. It's gonna be fast, you know?"

== Track listings ==
- 7-inch single
1. "The Real Thing" (Edit) – 3:40
2. "The Real Thing" (Tribal-Edit) – 3:55
- 12-inch maxi, Europe
1. "The Real Thing" (Trance-Thing) – 6:18
2. "The Real Thing" (Extended) – 6:20
3. "The Real Thing" (Tribal-Thing) – 5:53
- 12-inch maxi, Italy
1. "The Real Thing" (Extended) – 6:20
2. "The Real Thing" (Spaans) – 6:16
3. "The Real Thing" (Tribal-Thing) – 5:53
4. "The Real Thing" (Trance-Thing) – 6:18
- 12-inch maxi, UK
1. "The Real Thing" (Tribal Thing)
2. "The Real Thing" (Trance Thing)
3. "The Real Thing" (Extended 12")
- 12-inch maxi, US
1. "The Real Thing" (J&D's Wookie Vocal Mix) – 6:45
2. "The Real Thing" (Extended Euro Club Mix) – 6:18
3. "The Real Thing" (The Doc & Baron 90 Proof Club Mix) – 7:54
4. "The Real Thing" (The Tribal Thing) – 5:53
- 12-inch maxi, US
1. "The Real Thing" (Doc & Baron's NYC Dub Excursion) – 10:37
2. "The Real Thing" (J&D's Clubstrumental) – 4:20
3. "The Real Thing" (The It Goes Underground Mix) – 6:45
4. "The Real Thing" (The Trance Thing) – 5:38
- CD maxi, Europe and Canada
1. "The Real Thing" (Edit) – 3:40
2. "The Real Thing" (Trance Thing) – 6:18
3. "The Real Thing" (Extended) – 6:20
4. "The Real Thing" (Tribal Thing) – 5:53
- CD single, UK
1. "The Real Thing" — (3:42)
2. "The Real Thing" (Extended 12") – 6:20
3. "The Real Thing" (Trance-Thing) – 5:39
4. "The Real Thing" (Tribal-Thing) – 5:55
- CD maxi, US
1. "The Real Thing" (J & D's Wookie Radio Mix) – 3:51
2. "The Real Thing" (Extended Euro Club Mix) – 6:18
3. "The Real Thing" (J & D's Wookie Vocal Mix) – 6:45
4. "The Real Thing" (Doc Baron's 90 Proof Club Mix) – 7:54
5. "The Real Thing" (The Tribal Thing) – 5:56

== Charts ==
=== Weekly charts ===
Chart (1994)	Peak position
Australia (ARIA)	39
Austria (Ö3 Austria Top 40)	7
Belgium (Ultratop 50 Flanders)	2
Canada Retail Singles (The Record)	5
Denmark (IFPI)	2
El Salvador (UPI)	10
Europe (Eurochart Hot 100)	1
Europe (European Dance Radio)	2
Europe (European Hit Radio)	24
Finland (Suomen virallinen lista)	1
France (SNEP)	10
Germany (Media Control)	4
Iceland (Íslenski Listinn Topp 40)	14
Ireland (IRMA)	6
Israel (Israeli Singles Chart)	2
Italy (Musica e dischi)	22
Lithuania (M-1)	1
Netherlands (Dutch Top 40)	1
Netherlands (Single Top 100)	1
New Zealand (Recorded Music NZ)	22
Norway (VG-lista)	5
Scotland (OCC)	10
Spain (AFYVE)	3
Sweden (Sverigetopplistan)	2
Switzerland (Schweizer Hitparade)	2
UK Singles (OCC)	6
UK Dance (Music Week)	12

=== Year-end charts ===
Chart (1994)	Position
Belgium (Ultratop 50 Flanders)	28
Europe (Eurochart Hot 100)	31
Europe (European Dance Radio)	10
France (SNEP)	44
Germany (Media Control)	43
Netherlands (Dutch Top 40)	24
Netherlands (Single Top 100)	22
Sweden (Topplistan)	43
Switzerland (Schweizer Hitparade)	43
UK Singles (OCC)	107

== Release history ==
Region	Date	Format(s)	Label(s)	Ref.
United Kingdom	9 May 1994	7-inch vinyl; 12-inch vinyl; CD; cassette	PWL Continental	
Japan	1 June 1994	Mini-CD	Mercury	
Australia	6 June 1994	CD; cassette	Liberation; Byte	
