= Ray Slijngaard =

Dutch musician (born 1971)

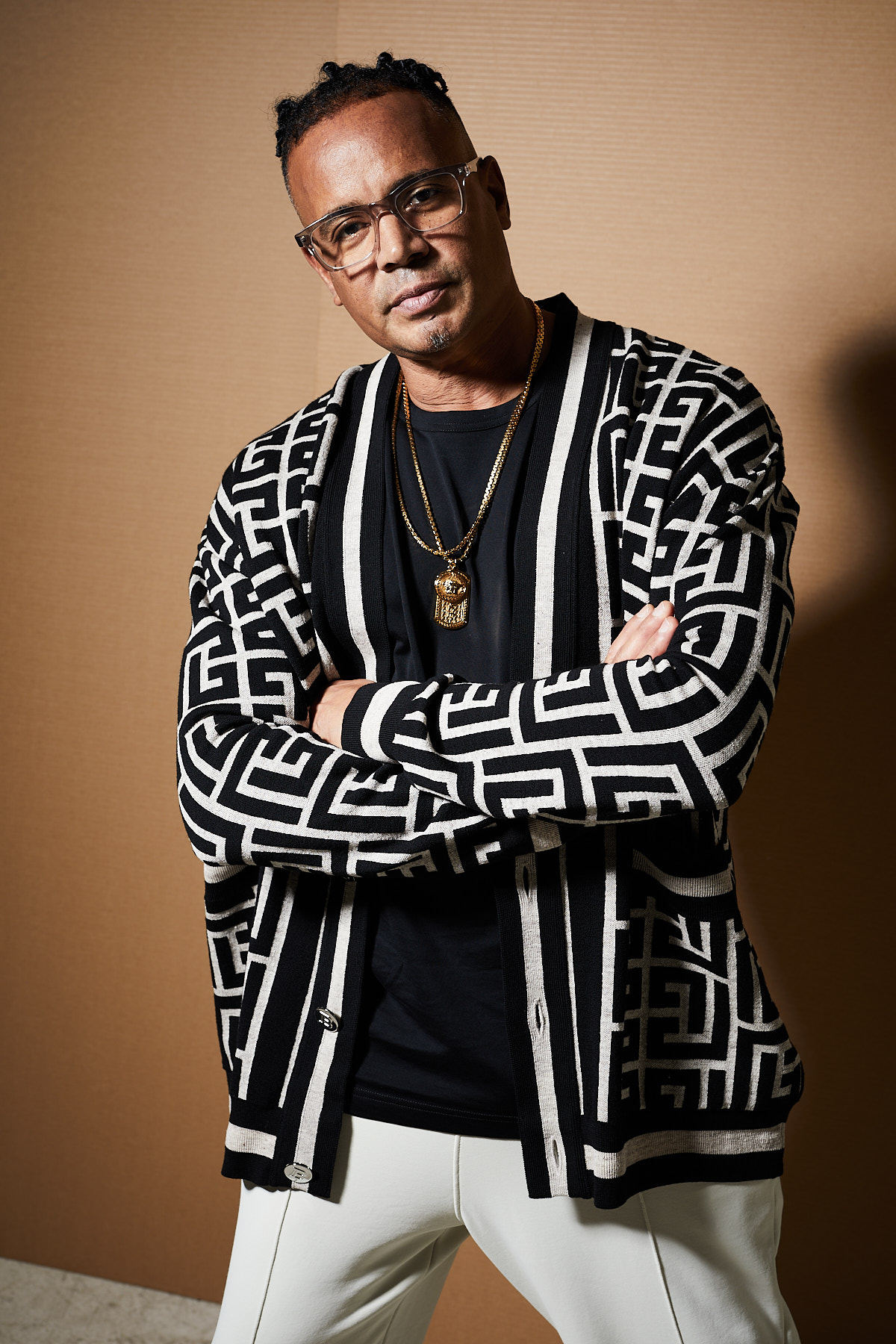
- Slijngaard in 2022

Background information
- Also known as: Kid Ray; Raytac
- Born: Raymond Lothar Slijngaard; 28 June 1971 (age 55); Amsterdam, Netherlands
- Genres: Eurodance; house; dance-pop; Hi-NRG; hip hop
- Occupations: Singer; rapper; songwriter
- Instrument: Vocals
- Years active: 1991–present
- Labels: ZYX; BYTE; ToCo; X-Ray; Rayvano; Spinnin'
- Formerly of: 2 Unlimited, Ray & Anita

Raymond Lothar Slijngaard (born 28 June 1971) is a Dutch singer and rapper best known as one half of the Eurodance duo 2 Unlimited.

== Music career ==
=== 2 Unlimited (1991–1996) ===
2 Unlimited is an electronic music project founded in 1991 by Belgian producers Jean-Paul DeCoster and Phil Wilde, and fronted by Dutch rapper Ray Slijngaard and Dutch vocalist Anita Doth.

In the early 1990s, Slijngaard was asked to write a rap lyric for a tune written by the two Belgian producers. Slijngaard also wrote a chorus to be sung by a female vocalist, for which he invited Anita Doth. The demo was presented to De Coster and Wilde, leading to Slijngaard joining 2 Unlimited, and "Get Ready for This" was produced as their first single. It became a big hit and was used in sporting events and movies.

Slijngaard rapped on most songs, though a few singles, such as "Nothing Like the Rain", had little involvement by the musician. The band became an instant success in Europe and throughout the world. Their hits included songs such as "Maximum Overdrive", "No Limit", "Tribal Dance", "The Real Thing", "Twilight Zone", and "Workaholic".

During his time with 2 Unlimited, Slijngaard was known for his hairstyle, which involved a shaved head and a few dreadlocks on his forehead. As the act released new songs, their title was often shaved into the remainder of the rapper's hair.

After sixteen music videos, twenty-three singles, and four albums, the group split up in 1996.

=== After 2 Unlimited (1996–2009) ===
After 2 Unlimited broke up in 1996, Slijngaard turned his attention to his own record company, X-Ray Records/Rayvano Productions, named after his son. He also released a single in 1997, titled "3 X a Day".

In 1999, Slijngaard teamed up with rappers Marvin D, Strezz, and Orphea (Keshaw) to form a new rap group called VIP Allstars. They achieved some success in the summer of 1999 with the tracks "When It's My Turn" and "Mamacita". The music was produced by Cyril Mahabier and Hurrigan Bouman; the two didn't receive credits for their production work, however.

In 2003, Slijngaard worked on a brand new project called Legends. He teamed up with Herman Rarebell from the German rock band Scorpions to release a single called "Eye of the Tiger". In 2007, he did a tour across South America. Apart from 2 Unlimited hits, he also sang a few unreleased tracks, such as "Arabesque", "Round And Round", and "Dance with Me".

=== 2 Unlimited comeback (2009–present) ===
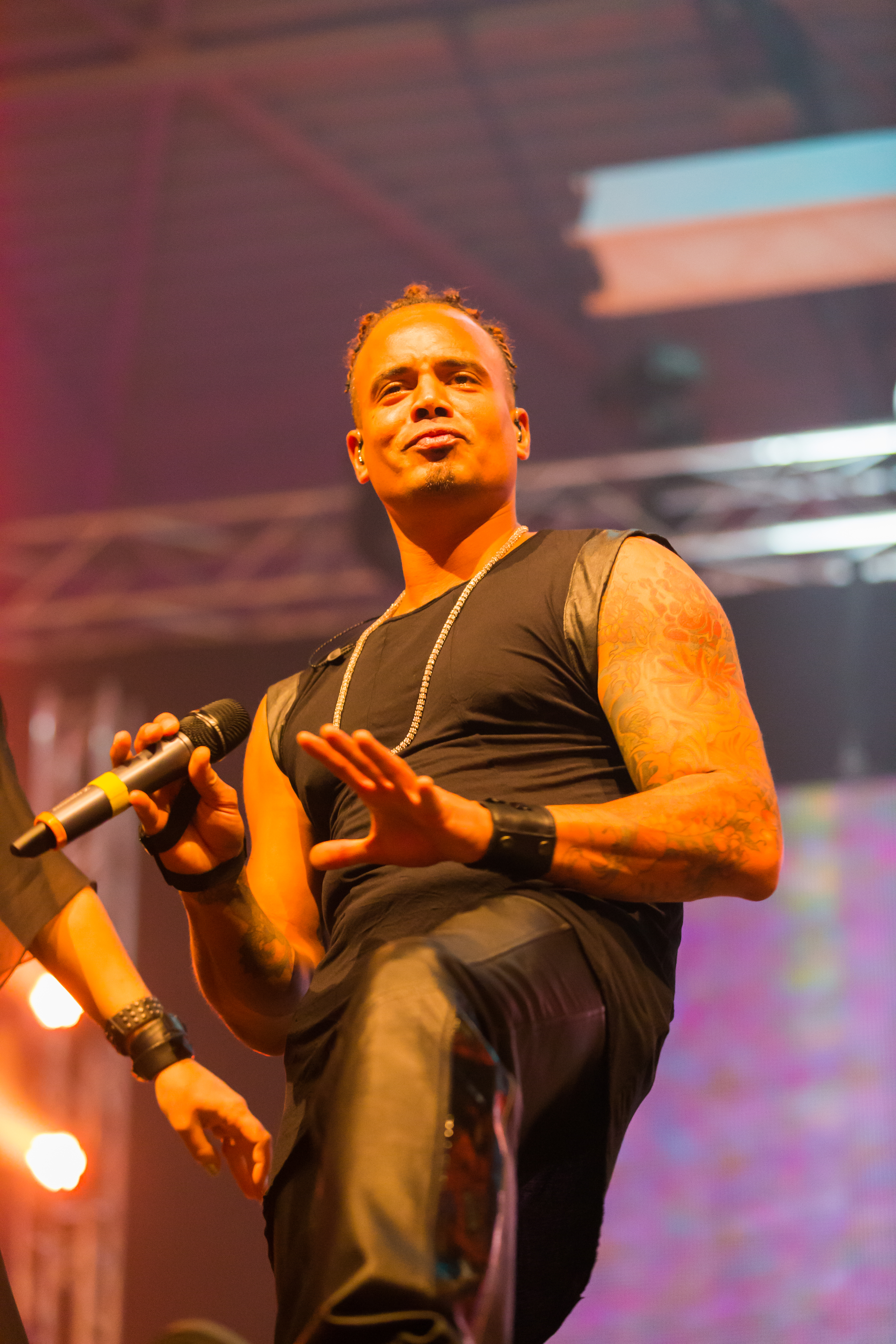
Slijngaard in 2014

Slijngaard and his former 2 Unlimited colleague Anita Doth reunited on 11 April 2009, to perform together for the first time in 13 years at the "I love the 90s" concert in Hasselt, Belgium. Further gigs followed on 30 April at the Radio 538 Queen's Day concert at Museumplein in Amsterdam, and as a support act for Milk Inc. at the Sportpaleis in Antwerp on 25 September.

Performing under the name Ray & Anita, it was confirmed on 29 December that the duo would release a new single together in 2010, titled "In Da Name of Love". Jean-Paul DeCoster is thought to have denied permission for them to use the name 2 Unlimited, as he still owns the rights to the brand.

On 11 July 2012, it was announced that Slijngaard and Doth would again be working with De Coster under the name 2 Unlimited.

== Personal life ==
Raymond Lothar Slijngaard was born in Amsterdam to a Surinamese father, Lothar Slijngaard, and a Dutch mother, Ingrid. In his early career, he was a chef while dreaming of becoming a rap star—singling out Snoop Dogg as his favourite at the time.

Slijngaard has a son, named Rayvano (b. 1996), with Hortence Gooding.

== Discography ==
=== with 2 Unlimited ===
- Get Ready! (1992)
- No Limits (1993)
- Real Things (1994)

=== Solo singles ===
Year	Title	Chart position
Year	Title	NLD 100
1997	"3 X a Day"	66
1997	"Do You Think I'm Sexy"	—

=== Collaborations ===
Year	Title	Chart position
Year	Title	NLD 100
1998	"Black Night" (as Ray & Ian Gillan)	—
1999	"When It's My Turn" (as VIP Allstars)	34
1999	"Mamacita" (as VIP Allstars)	68
2010	"Throw It Up" (as Regi & Ray)	—
2013	"What U Waitin' 4" (as The Dutchables featuring Ray & Lovebug)	—
