= Anita Doth =

Dutch singer and songwriter (born 1971)

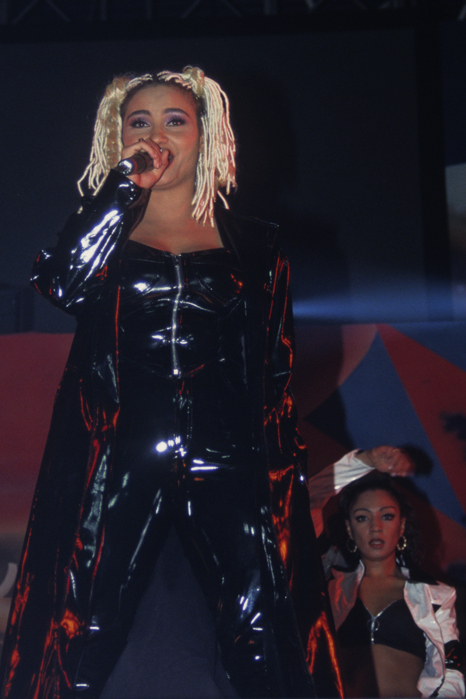
- Doth during a live show in Utrecht, the Netherlands, December 1995

Background information
- Born: Anita Daniëlle Dels; 28 December 1971 (age 54); Amsterdam, Netherlands
- Genres: Eurodance, house, dance-pop, Hi-NRG
- Occupations: Singer; songwriter; DJ; host
- Instruments: Vocal; piano
- Years active: 1991–present
- Labels: ZYX Records, BYTE Records, ToCo International, Pleasure Records, Spinnin' Records

Anita Doth (born 28 December 1971) is a Dutch singer and songwriter. She was the singer of the duo 2 Unlimited, which she formed together with rapper Ray Slijngaard.

== Personal life ==
Anita Daniëlle Dels was born in Amsterdam to a Surinamese father, Rolf Dels, and a Dutch mother, Lydia. In 1991 she finished her education and landed her first job in an administrative position at a police station. She has one son.

In January 2010, Doth announced that she was being treated for breast cancer, and undergoing chemotherapy. She continued to perform with Ray as much as possible under her treatment regimen. In 2011, she was declared cancer-free.

On 8 November 2013, Doth announced via Twitter that 2 Unlimited would be taking a break until April 2014 as she was pregnant. The birth was expected in February 2014.

== Music career ==
=== 2 Unlimited (1991–1996) ===
2 Unlimited is a Eurodance project founded in 1991 by two Belgian producers Jean-Paul DeCoster and Phil Wilde and fronted by Dutch rapper Ray Slijngaard and Anita Doth.

In the early 1990s, Slijngaard had been asked to write rap lyrics for a tune written by de Coster and Wilde. He also wrote a chorus to be sung by a female vocalist, for which he asked Doth to sing the lyrics. The demo was presented to de Coster and Wilde, leading to Doth joining 2 Unlimited, and "Get Ready for This" was produced as their first single.

Doth sang the choruses for the majority of their songs; however, there were some B sides, and one single, "Nothing Like the Rain", where she sang most of the lyrics. Their singles included "Maximum Overdrive", "No Limit", "Tribal Dance", "The Real Thing", "Twilight Zone" and "Workaholic". After sixteen music videos, 45 songs, and four albums, the group split up in 1996.

=== After 2 Unlimited (1996–2009) ===
After 2 Unlimited broke up in 1996, Doth became a presenter on Dutch music television station TMF (The Music Factory), hosting Welcome to the Pleasure Zone, a show featuring both music videos and live performances. She also worked as a DJ on Dutch radio station Radio 538. Later that year, she sang a duet with popular Dutch singer René Froger titled "That's When I'll Stop Loving You".

In 2000, she released her solo album, Reality. Among the singles taken from the album were "Universe", "Lifting up My Life", and "This Is Reality". Doth worked with producers Todd Terry and Steve Mac, among others.

In 2002, Doth formed Divas of Dance with Linda Estelle (formerly of T-Spoon) and Desiree "Des'Ray" Manders (formerly of 2 Brothers on the 4th Floor). They performed a variety of disco and dance classics, including the biggest hits from each of their respective bands. In 2006, Divas of Dance released a single entitled "Falling into the Groove".

During the later 2000s, Doth toured the UK as part of the 90s Reloaded Adult Weekenders at Butlin's. Billed as "Anita Doth from 2 Unlimited", the performance would include the biggest hits of 2 Unlimited from the 1990s.

=== 2 Unlimited comeback (2009–2016) ===
Doth and Ray Slijngaard reunited on 11 April 2009, to perform together for the first time in 13 years at the "I love the 90s" concert in Hasselt, Belgium. Further gigs followed on 30 April at the Radio 538 Queen's Day concert at Museumplein in Amsterdam, and as support act for Milk Inc. at the Sportpaleis in Antwerp on 25 September.

Performing under the name Ray & Anita, it was confirmed on 29 December that the duo would release a new single together in 2010 titled "In Da Name Of Love". Jean-Paul de Coster is thought to have denied permission for them to use the name "2 Unlimited", as he still owns the rights to the brand.

On 11 July 2012, it was announced that Slijngaard and Doth would be working again with the Belgian producer, de Coster under the name 2 Unlimited.

=== Departure from 2 Unlimited (2016–present) ===
On 20 April 2016, 2 Unlimited announced that Doth would be leaving the band to embark on a solo career. On 13 August, Kim Vergouwen was announced as Doth's replacement in 2 Unlimited.

== Discography ==
=== Studio albums ===
Title	Album details
Reality	Released: 2000; Label: Pleasure Records (#PR99412); Formats: CS, CD

=== Singles as lead artist ===
Title	Year	Peak chart positions	Album
Title	Year	NDL	Album
"That's When I'll Stop Loving You" (with René Froger)	1997	52	Illegal Romeo Part 1
"Universe"	1999	94	Reality
"Lifting Up My Life"	2000	67	Reality
"This is Reality"	2001	57	Reality
"Next Level"	2012	—	Non-album singles
"Baby I Want You" (with Jeroen)	2012	—	Non-album singles
"Marathon" (with JeBroer)	2017	73	JeBroer 4 Life
"Popcorn" (with Outsiders & Bass Chazers)	2021	—	Non-album singles
"Level Up"	2023	—	Non-album singles
"You Gotta Go Go" (with Synatrick)	2026	—	Non-album singles
"—" denotes items that did not chart or were not released in that territory.

=== Singles as featured artist ===
Title	Year	Peak chart positions			Album
Title	Year	NDL	BEL	BEL Dance	Album
"Cancion Del Mariachi" (D-Rashid & Roberto Da Costa featuring Anita Doth)	2010	—	—	—	Non-album singles
"Howl" (Drive Like Maria featuring Anita Doth)	2013	—	—	—	Drive Like Maria
"Ain't Gonna Wait On Love" (Van Noten & Van Zandt featuring Anita Doth)	2013	—	49	32	Non-album singles
"Is This Love" (DJ Galaga featuring Anita Doth)	2015	—	—	—	Non-album singles
"Can't Hold Us" (Rät N Frikk featuring Anita Doth)	2015	—	—	—	Non-album singles
"Take Me to Your Rhythm" (Phil Wilde featuring Anita Doth)	2018	—	—	—	Non-album singles
"Like a Lion" (OJKB featuring Anita Doth)	2018	—	—	—	Non-album singles
"Fuck You" (Kamping Kitsch Club Soundsystem and Danzel featuring Anita Doth)	2019	—	—	—	Non-album singles
"Vieze Belletjes" (Donnie, Tony Scott and Mason feeaturing Anita Doth)	2022	—	—	—	Non-album singles
"—" denotes items that did not chart or were not released in that territory.
