= Byte Records =

Belgian independent music label

- Founded: 1988
- Founder: Jean-Paul De Coster
- Genre: Dance; Eurodance; hi-NRG; soul
- Country of origin: Belgium

Byte Records is a Belgian-based independent music label specializing in dance music. The company was founded by DJ Jean-Paul De Coster in 1988 and is named after his former record store in Antwerp. Successful acts have included 2 Unlimited, Sash! and Sylver. Through the years the label had several sub-labels like B³ (Byte Blue), Byte Progressive, Discomatic and La Belle Noir.

One of the first Byte releases was "Don't Miss The Party Line" by Jean-Paul De Coster and Peter Neefs as Bizz Nizz. The single was licensed by Cooltempo, a sub-label of Chrysalis (now EMI) and became a top 10 hit in the UK by the end of the 1980s. Together with producer Phil Wilde Jean-Paul De Coster formed the producers duo behind the famous Eurodance act 2 Unlimited in the beginning of the 1990s. Licenses were given by Byte to PWL Continental and ZYX Music and the act sold more than 20 million records and 50 million compilations worldwide, giving Byte Records a tremendous boost. Other Eurodance acts followed and Byte became a household name in the dance community. Most of the artists became popular in Belgium, The Netherlands and Germany like Timeshift, CB Milton, Red 5, Sash! and DJ Peter Project. But due to the bad economic climate in the music industry, Byte had to reduce his activities over the years. Since early 2004 dance act Sylver has been the only remaining act signed by Byte Records.

== List of artists ==
- Bizz Nizz
- 2 Unlimited
- Timeshift
- CB Milton
- Ice MC
- 740 Boyz
- Murray Head
- Red 5
- Sash!
- The Oh!
- Phats & Small
- DJ Peter Project
- Atlantis 6
- Sylver
- Zippora
- D-Devils
