= 2 Unlimited discography =

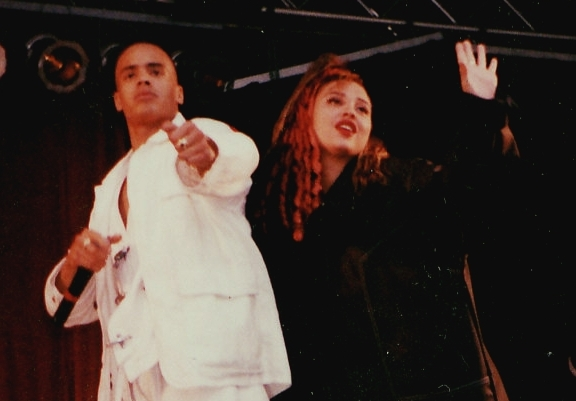
- Studio albums: 4
- Compilation albums: 5
- Singles: 22
- Music videos: 21

This is the discography of 2 Unlimited, a Eurodance project founded in 1991 by Belgian producers Jean-Paul DeCoster and Phil Wilde and fronted by Dutch rapper Ray Slijngaard and Dutch vocalist Anita Doth. With global sales of over 18 million units, 2 Unlimited is one of the biggest selling groups from the Netherlands and Belgium.

== Albums ==
=== Studio albums ===
Title	Album details	Peak chart positions										Certifications
Title	Album details	NLD	AUS	AUT	CAN	GER	JPN	SWE	SWI	UK	US	Certifications
Get Ready!	Released: 24 February 1992; Label: Byte Records, ZYX; Formats: CD, cassette, vinyl	12	10	—	17	—	85	27	—	37	197	AUS: Gold; US: Gold
No Limits	Released: 10 May 1993; Label: Byte Records, ZYX; Formats: CD, cassette, vinyl	1	3	3	7	4	17	3	3	1	—	NLD: Platinum; AUS: Gold; AUT: Gold; JPN: Gold; NOR: Platinum; SWE: Platinum; SWI: Platinum
Real Things	Released: 6 June 1994; Label: Byte Records, ZYX; Formats: CD, cassette, vinyl	1	18	4	33	3	16	2	3	1	—	NLD: Platinum; SWI: Gold; UK: Gold; JPN: Gold
II (Titled "Wanna Get Up" in Japan)	Released: 25 May 1998; Label: Byte Records; Formats: CD, cassette, vinyl	55	—	—	—	—	56	—	—	—	—	
"—" denotes items that did not chart or were not released.

=== Compilation albums ===
Title	Album details	Peak chart positions										Certifications
Title	Album details	NLD	AUS	BEL^{(Fl)}	BEL^{(Wa)}	FIN	JPN	NOR	NZ	UK	US	Certifications
Hits Unlimited	Released: 30 October 1995; Label: Byte Records, ZYX; Formats: CD, cassette, vinyl	4	78	5	24	24	7	22	8	27	107	NLD: Gold; JPN: Gold; NZ: Gold
Best Hits	Released: 1995; Label: Byte Records; Formats: CD	—	—	—	—	—	—	—	—	—	—	
Best Unlimited	Released: 30 September 1998; Label: Prime Cut; Formats: CD	—	—	—	—	—	85	—	—	—	—	
The Complete History	Released: 9 February 2004; Label: ZYX; Formats: CD, cassette	—	—	—	—	—	—	—	—	—	—	
Unlimited Hits and Remixes	Released: 17 May 2014; Label: Byte Records; Formats: Digital	—	—	105	—	—	—	—	—	—	—	
"—" denotes items that did not chart or were not released.

=== Remix albums ===
Year	Album Title	Chart Position
Year	Album Title	JPN
1993	Power Tracks'	62
1998	Non-Stop Mix Best	—
2001	Greatest Hits Remixes	—
2002	Trance Remixes	—
2006	Greatest Remix Hits	—

== Singles ==
Title	Year	Peak chart positions										Certifications	Album
Title	Year	NLD	AUS	BEL^{(Fl)}	FRA	GER	SPA	SWE	SWI	UK	US	Certifications	Album
"Get Ready for This"	1991	10	2	8	—	—	2	36	—	2	38	AUS: Gold	Get Ready!
"Twilight Zone"	1992	1	11	5	—	20	3	9	15	2	49		Get Ready!
"Workaholic"	1992	4	35	8	—	—	6	24	37	4	—		Get Ready!
"The Magic Friend"	1992	3	16	4	—	17	9	27	—	11	—		Get Ready!
"No Limit"	1993	1	7	1	1	1	2	1	1	1	—	NLD: Platinum; AUS: Gold; AUT: Gold; FRA: Gold; GER: Platinum; SWI: Platinum	No Limits
"Tribal Dance"	1993	2	5	2	4	2	1	2	2	4	—	AUS: Gold; GER: Gold	No Limits
"Faces"	1993	2	54	3	16	8	4	11	19	8	—		No Limits
"Maximum Overdrive"	1993	6	32	4	35	16	2	18	23	15	—		No Limits
"Let the Beat Control Your Body"	1994	2	39	4	10	8	10	11	11	6	—		No Limits
"The Real Thing"	1994	1	39	2	10	4	3	2	2	6	—		Real Things
"No One"	1994	3	70	3	19	18	10	15	15	17	—		Real Things
"Here I Go"	1995	4	80	6	25	22	11	20	38	22	—		Real Things
"Nothing Like the Rain"	1995	8	134	23	—	—	14	—	—	—	—		Real Things
"Do What's Good for Me"	1995	14	87	14	—	50	3	35	41	16	—		Hits Unlimited
"Jump for Joy"	1996	8	137	12	—	39	4	32	—	—	—		Hits Unlimited
"Spread Your Love"	1996	13	—	19	—	—	10	45	—	—	—		Hits Unlimited
"Wanna Get Up"	1998	15	128	7	70	88	3	58	—	38	—		II
"Edge of Heaven"	1998	41	—	7	—	—	8	—	—	—	—		II
"Never Surrender"	1998	59	121	23	—	—	5	—	—	—	—		II
"No Limit 2.3"	2003	—	—	—	—	41	—	—	—	—	—		The Complete History
"Tribal Dance 2.4"	2004	—	—	—	—	78	—	—	—	—	—		The Complete History
"Get Ready for This" (Steve Aoki remix)	2013	—	—	—	—	—	—	—	—	—	—		Unlimited Hits and Remixes
"No Limit" (Brasilian remix)	2014	—	—	—	—	—	—	—	—	—	—		Unlimited Hits and Remixes
"—" denotes a title that did not chart, or was not released in that territory.

== Video games ==
2 Unlimited has a total of 4 songs which appear in the Dance Dance Revolution arcade series. A cover version of the original "Twilight Zone" was featured on Dancing Stage Featuring Disney's Rave, while an official remix of "Twilight Zone" was featured in DDRMAX Dance Dance Revolution 6thMix and two other arcade releases.

Additionally, the original version of "No Limit" appears in Just Dance 3, while the original version of "Tribal Dance" appears in Just Dance 4.

The Super Nintendo game Bio-Metal had its soundtrack for the American release reworked entirely of remixes from the 1992 album Get Ready!.

Song	Arcade game				
Song	Disney	5th	MAX	MAX2	Ex
"Twilight Zone"	Cover				
"No Limit (RM Remix)"		Yes			
"Tribal Dance (Almighty Mix)"		Yes			
"Twilight Zone (R-C Extended Club Mix)"			Yes	Yes	Yes
"Maximum Overdrive (KC Club Mix)"				Yes	Yes
