= Greatest Remix Hits (2 Unlimited album) =

Remix album by 2 Unlimited
- Released: 2006
- Genre: Eurodance
- Label: Rajon Music Group

2 Unlimited chronology
| Trance Remixes (Special Edition) (2002) | Greatest Remix Hits (2006) |

Argentinian cover

Asian cover

South African cover

Greatest Remix Hits is a 2006 remix album and DVD compilation by 2 Unlimited, a Eurodance project founded in 1991 by Belgian producers Jean-Paul DeCoster and Phil Wilde and fronted by Dutch rapper Ray Slijngaard and Dutch vocalist Anita Doth.

== Album information ==
The Greatest Remix Hits album comes with a DVD featuring their music videos (the same one included with The Complete History released in 2004).

== Release history ==
This compilation has been re-released in several countries around the world since the original Australian release. Some of these countries include South Africa, Argentina and much of Europe.

== Track listing ==
=== CD ===
1. Get Ready For This (Orchestral Mix)
2. Twilight Zone (Rave Version)
3. No Limits (Extended)
4. Tribal Dance (Long Version)
5. Here I Go (X Out In Club)
6. Real Thing (Extended)
7. No One (Unlimited Remix)
8. Let The Beat Control Your Body (Extended)
9. Magic Friend (Extended)
10. Nothing Like The Rain (Rainy Remix)
11. Workaholic (Extended)
12. Faces (Automatic Breakbeat Remix)
13. Murphy's Megamix (Part 1)

=== DVD ===
1. No Limit
2. Faces
3. Maximum Overdrive
4. Let the Beat Control Your Body
5. The Real Thing
6. No One
7. The Magic Friend
8. Workaholic
9. Get Ready for This
10. Tribal Dance
11. Nothing Like the Rain
12. Here I Go
13. Jump For Joy
14. Do What's Good for Me
15. Spread Your Love
16. No Limit 2.3 (Master Blaster remix)
17. Countdown Special
