= Power Tracks =

Remix album by 2 Unlimited
- Released: 1993
- Genre: Eurodance
- Label: Mercury Records
- Producer: Jean-Paul de Coster, Phil Wilde

2 Unlimited chronology
| Power Tracks (1993) | Non-Stop Mix Best (1998) |

Power Tracks is a 1993 album by 2 Unlimited, a Eurodance project founded in 1991 by Belgian producers Jean-Paul DeCoster and Phil Wilde and fronted by Dutch rapper Ray Slijngaard and Dutch vocalist Anita Doth.

== Release history ==
Containing 11 tracks, the album was released to celebrate the visit of 2 Unlimited to Japan in 1994.

== Track listing ==
1. "No Limit" (Rio and Le Jean Remix) – 4:00
2. "Get Ready For This" (800 Mix) – 5:28
3. "The Magic Friend" (Rio and Le Jean Remix) – 5:16
4. "R.U.O.K." - 4:14
5. "Workaholic" (Hardcore Remix) - 4:16
6. "Twilight Zone" (Rapping Rave Version) - 5:47
7. "Tribal Dance" (Extended) – 5:14
8. "Mysterious" - 4:26
9. "Faces" (Trancs-Aumatic Remix) - 5:24
10. "The Power Age" - 4:04
11. "Juliana's Global Dance Network Mix" - 9:58

Get Ready for This, Workaholic and No Limit

== Charts ==
- Japan: #62
