= Best Unlimited =

Compilation album by 2 Unlimited
- Released: 30 September 1998
- Genre: Eurodance
- Label: Mercury Records
- Producer: Jean-Paul de Coster, Phil Wilde

Best Unlimited is a greatest hits compilation from 2 Unlimited, a Eurodance project founded in 1991 by Belgian producers Jean-Paul DeCoster and Phil Wilde and fronted by Dutch rapper Ray Slijngaard and Dutch vocalist Anita Doth. The record was released on 30 September 1998 via Mercury Records.

== Release History ==
Best Unlimited was released in 1998 through record label Mercury Records in Japan.

== Track listing ==
1. "Wanna Get Up" – 3:15
2. "No Limit" – 3:30
3. "Get Ready For This" – 3:42
4. "Let The Beat Control Your Body" – 3:38
5. "The Edge of Heaven" – 4:14
6. "Jump For Joy" – 3:42
7. "Closer 2 U" – 5:14
8. "Back Into The Groove" – 4:00
9. "Workaholic" – 3:35
10. "Never Surrender" – 3:55
11. "Tribal Dance" – 3:41
12. "Twilight Zone" – 4:10
13. "The Real Thing" – 3:40
14. "Wanna Get Up" (Sash! Radio Edit) – 3:16
15. "The Edge Of Heaven" (Sharp Funky Driver Remix) - 8:57
16. "II Unlimited Megamix" - 3:47

== Charts ==
- Japan: #85
