= Biometal =

Biometal or biometals may refer to:

- Biometal (biology), metal ions important in biology, biochemistry, and medicine
- BioMetals (journal)

== Video games ==
- BioMetal (video game), a 1993 video game
- A technological device used in the Mega Man ZX series of video games
- Battlezone (1998 video game), a video game where Biometal is the resource
- Battlezone II: Combat Commander, a 1999 video game where Biometal is the resource
