= Sin Limites =

Eurodance EP by 2 Unlimited

EP by 2 Unlimited
- Released: 1994
- Recorded: 1994
- Genre: Eurodance
- Label: Radikal Records, ToCo International
- Producer: Phil Wilde, Jean-Paul De Coster

Chile cover

"Sin Limites" is a four-track EP recorded by Belgian/Dutch Eurodance group 2 Unlimited.

== Release ==
Sin Limites was released in 1994 as a collector's item in Chile and the US. It did not chart in these territories.

== Content ==
Sin Limites is a collection of four hits from 2 Unlimited, but all choruses are sung by Anita in Spanish. The rap lyrics by Ray were the same as the English version releases of the singles.

During tours of Spanish speaking countries, Anita would often sing the Spanish versions of the songs. One of the most notable concert performances was the 1996 Vina Del Mar show in Chile.

== Track listing ==
CD single EP

1. "Faces/Caras" (3:37)
2. "Let the Beat Control Your Body/Deja El Ritmo Controlar Tu Cuerpo" (3:38)
3. "Maximum Overdrive/A Toda Maquina" (3:42)
4. "Tribal Dance/Ritmo Tribal" (3:42)

Cassette

(Side A)

1. "Caras" (3:37)
2. "Deja El Ritmo Controlar Tu Cuerpo" (3:38)
3. "A Toda Maquina" (3:42)
4. "Ritmo Tribal" (3:42)

(Side B)

1. "Faces" (3:37)
2. "Let the Beat Control Your Body" (3:38)
3. "Maximum Overdrive" (3:42)
4. "Tribal Dance" (3:42)

== Hits Sin Limites ==
Hit Sin Limites

Compilation album by 2 Unlimited
- Released: 1996

In 1996, following their successful visit to Chile at the Vina Del Mar awards, an unofficial album containing some of 2 Unlimited's biggest hits was released. All songs are sung in Spanish by Anita while Ray continues to sing all rap lyrics in English.

The original English version releases are used on the two megamixes (tracks 12–13).

=== Track listing ===
1. "Ritmo Tribal" (3:39)
2. "Caras" (3:33)
3. "A Toda Maquina" (3:43)
4. "Deja El Ritmo Controlar Tu Cuerpo" (3:40)
5. "La Cosa Real (3:41)
6. "Nadie" (3:29)
7. "Here I Go" (3:19)
8. "Es Como El Llover" (4:42)
9. "Hare Lo Bueno Para Mi" (3:55)
10. "Saltar De Amor" (3:46)
11. "Da Tu Amor" (4:45)
12. "MTV Partyzone Megamix" (4:56)
13. "2 Unlimited Megamix" (6:04)
