= Dezaemon =

1991 video game

- Box art
- Developer: Athena
- Publisher: Athena
- Platforms: Family Computer, Super Famicom, PlayStation
- Release: JP: September 13, 1991; SFC: JP: September 20, 1994; PlayStation: JP: May 24, 1996
- Genres: Scrolling shooter, game creation system
- Mode: Single-player

Dezaemon (Note: Japanese: 絵描衛門, Hepburn: Dezaemon) is a 1991 vertically scrolling shooter video game and game creation system developed and published by Athena for the Family Computer. It was released only in Japan on September 13, 1991. An enhanced version was released for the Super Famicom on September 20, 1994 and the PlayStation as Dezaemon Plus on May 24, 1996.

Despite its expensive price and entry barrier, the game has maintained a small but dedicated community of level creators, with new games such as Devil Blade Reboot being developed to this day. It is one of the earliest game creation systems easily accessible to console players, paving the way to similar systems such as Blast Works and Super Mario Maker. It was followed by a sequel, Dezaemon 2 for the Sega Saturn, as well as spin-offs, Dezaemon 3D for the Nintendo 64 and Dezaemon Kids! for the PlayStation.

Hamster Corporation acquired the game's rights alongside Athena's catalogue, releasing the game outside Japan as part of their Console Archives series for the Nintendo Switch 2 and PlayStation 5 in February 2026, while the PlayStation version will be added at a later date.

== Gameplay ==
The player can design vertically scrolling shooter games with the available tools in a manner similar to developing for a NES development kit. The player's spaceship sprites can be customized alongside the backgrounds, music, enemies and projectiles, a relatively ambitious and robust system for the time. The SNES and PlayStation versions offer vastly improved variety in graphics and music. The SNES version includes Daioh Gale, a sequel to Athena's arcade shooter Daioh, as a built-in game developed to display the game's capabilities.

== Reception ==
Gonçalo Lopes of Nintendo Life gave the SNES version a 8/10 score, praising the robust course editing tools and rewarding design experience, though he lamented the lack of a modern successor to the game.
