= Greatest Remix Hits =

Greatest Remix Hits may refer to:

- Greatest Remix Hits (2 Unlimited album), 2006
- Greatest Remix Hits (album series)
