= Workaholic (disambiguation) =

A workaholic is someone suffering from a psychological disorder. Workaholic, or variants, may also refer to:

- Workaholics, a 2011 television comedy series on Comedy Central
- Workaholic (song), song by 2 Unlimited
