= No Limits (2 Unlimited album) =

No Limits!

Studio album by 2 Unlimited
- Released: 10 May 1993
- Recorded: 1992–93
- Studio: Soundstational Studios
- Genres: Eurodance; techno; dance-pop
- Length: 59:55; 70:42 (with bonus tracks)
- Label: Byte Records (Sony / PWL)
- Producers: Jean-Paul de Coster (exec. prod.); Phil Wilde

2 Unlimited chronology
Get Ready! (1992)	No Limits! (1993)	Real Things (1994)

Alternative cover
- UK cover for the album

Singles from No Limits
- 1. "No Limit" Released: 18 January 1993; 2. "Tribal Dance" Released: 26 April 1993; 3. "Faces" Released: 23 August 1993; 4. "Maximum Overdrive" Released: 8 November 1993; 5. "Let the Beat Control Your Body" Released: 21 January 1994

No Limits, sometimes No Limits!, is the second studio album by Belgian/Dutch Eurodance band 2 Unlimited, released in May 1993. The album yielded five singles, including "No Limit", which reached number one in many European charts. The album went platinum in several countries. It was fronted by Ray Slijngaard performing the main rap and Anita Dels providing the chorus.

== Background ==
2 Unlimited had limited success in 1992 with their debut album, Get Ready!. It had produced four hit singles, but the album had not performed well commercially, peaking at just #37 in the UK Albums Chart. At the time, many Eurodance acts were able to produce hit singles but were unable to capitalize on this with a commercially successful album. 2 Unlimited, however, broke the mold.

At the end of 1992, 2 Unlimited were still only known amongst those who followed chart music at the time. With the first single released from this album, "No Limit", this changed. It went to number 1 in the UK Singles Chart in early February (competing with "I Will Always Love You" by Whitney Houston), and spent five weeks there. This exposure led to them being parodied by the mainstream media with the television series Spitting Image parodying the track as "No Lyrics" due to its repetitive lyrical content. The second single from the album, "Tribal Dance", was released in 1993, followed by this album soon afterwards.

== Album name and artwork ==
Like all the studio albums by the band, the title of the album was a modification of the title of the lead single to be taken from it. The artwork for the UK cover was designed by Julian Barton and David Howells. As with all 2 Unlimited releases, most other territories featured a different album cover to the UK edition of the album. Unlike their previous album in the UK, where many of the tracks featured on it were instrumental, the artwork to this album featured band members Ray and Anita on the front cover.

== Writing and composition ==
For the debut album, Get Ready!, most of the writing had been done by Wilde and de Coster, with some input from Ray Slijngaard and other featured writers. For No Limits!, both Ray and Anita had much more input into the song writing process compared to the previous album. Anita has writing credits on seven of the album's fourteen songs and Ray has writing credits on ten of them.

== United Kingdom release ==
The United Kingdom version of No Limits, which was released on the PWL Continental label, is largely an instrumental album, having Ray Slijngaard's rap verses removed. The decision to do this was made by Pete Waterman, owner of the PWL record label. Waterman was also responsible for the removal of Slijngaard's rap verses from 2 Unlimited's single releases of Get Ready For This, Twilight Zone, Workaholic, The Magic Friend, No Limit, Tribal Dance and Faces.

This led to 2 Unlimited being mocked in the UK media, leading to nicknames like 2 Untalented, and Spitting Image's parody “There’s no lyrics”, along with ribbing by BBC Live & Kicking.

== Critical reception ==
Professional ratings
Review scores
Source	Rating
AllMusic	2/5 stars
Music & Media	(favorable)
Music Week	3/5 stars
Port Lincoln Times	(favorable)
Smash Hits	3/5 stars

Despite its commercial success, at the time the album was panned by the critics, especially in the UK. But European magazine Music & Media gave a positive review, writing, "Those for whom "techno" is a pet hate always say "just push the button and out rolls another techno tune." It's not that simple of course, although this Dutch male/female duo has the gift to make you believe they do their thing in only two minutes. But isn't simplicity the hardest thing to achieve? Like a juke box this 16-track album is stuffed with potential singles, such as the extremely poppy The Power Age and Maximum Overdrive with a racing car breaking all speed limits." In Smash Hits, reviewer Mark Frith described the album as an "across the board techno splurge" and stated that this album contained clues as to why the band were unpopular in "elite dance circles". In the review of the single "Maximum Overdrive", the magazine reiterated that the band were, "not hard or imaginative and they have no credibility in dance circles."

The AllMusic review stated that beyond "No Limit" and "Let the Beat Control Your Body", there was little to recommend this album. Toby Anstis stated in his review of "Faces" that he "thought the album sounded all the same". Nonetheless, the band won the Best Dance Act award in Smash Hits that year as well as the World Music Award for Benelux.

Retrospective reviews of this album and the band in general have been more favourable. Only three years after the band split, they were described in a Guinness World Records publication as "spectacular" with the sound of "No Limit" being compared to "the sound giant dinosaurs might make stomping on cities". Their entry then goes on to describe their choruses as "chant-worthy" and that the singles from this album "ravaged hearts and minds across the globe", ending with the statement that they "linger forever in the hearts of true music lovers".

== Track listing ==
No.	Title	Length
1.	"No Limit"	3:44
2.	"Tribal Dance"	4:31
3.	"Mysterious"	4:23
4.	"Faces"	3:48
5.	"Maximum Overdrive"	3:58
6.	"The Power Age"	3:59
7.	"Break the Chain"	3:49
8.	"Kiss Me Bliss Me"	3:52
9.	"Throw the Groove Down"	4:18
10.	"R.U.O.K."	4:11
11.	"Let the Beat Control Your Body"	4:02
12.	"Invite Me to Trance"	4:07
13.	"Where Are You Now"	5:01
14.	"Shelter for a Rainy Day"	5:15
15.	"Get Ready for This (Wilde Mix)"	5:59
16.	"No Limit (Automatic Breakbeat Remix)"	4:48
Total length:		1:14:45

== Charts ==
=== Weekly charts ===
Chart (1993)	Peak position
Australian Albums (ARIA)	3
Austrian Albums (Ö3 Austria)	3
Canada Top Albums/CDs (RPM)	7
Dutch Albums (Album Top 100)	1
French Albums (SNEP)	6
German Albums (Offizielle Top 100)	4
Hungarian Albums (MAHASZ)	2
Norwegian Albums (VG-lista)	2
Swedish Albums (Sverigetopplistan)	3
Swiss Albums (Schweizer Hitparade)	3
UK Albums (Official Charts)	1

=== Year-end charts ===
Chart (1993)	Position
Austrian Albums (Ö3 Austria)	34
Canada Top Albums/CDs (RPM)	65
Dutch Albums (Album Top 100)	11
German Albums (Offizielle Top 100)	16
Swiss Albums (Schweizer Hitparade)	10

Chart (1994)	Position
Dutch Albums (Album Top 100)	81
German Albums (Offizielle Top 100)	86

== Certifications and sales ==
Region	Certification	Certified units/sales
Australia (ARIA)	Gold	35,000^{^}
Austria (IFPI Austria)	Gold	25,000^{*}
Brazil	—	30,000
Finland (Musiikkituottajat)	Gold	44,400
France (SNEP)	Gold	268,000
Japan (RIAJ)	Gold	100,000^{^}
Netherlands (NVPI)	Platinum	100,000^{^}
Norway (IFPI Norway)	Platinum	50,000^{*}
Spain (Promusicae)	Gold	50,000^{^}
Sweden (GLF)	Platinum	100,000^{^}
Switzerland (IFPI Switzerland)	Platinum	50,000^{^}
United Kingdom	—	254,000
Summaries
Benelux	—	294,000
Germany, Switzerland, Austria	—	592,000
Worldwide	—	3,000,000
^{*} Sales figures based on certification alone.^{^} Shipments figures based on certification alone.

=== Singles ===
Year	Title	UK	Netherlands	Germany	Switzerland	Austria	Spain	France	Ireland	Sweden	Norway	Canada	Australia	NZ
1993	"No Limit"	1	1	2	1	1	1	1	1	1	1	1	7	40
1993	"Tribal Dance"	4	2	2	2	3	1	4	2	2	4	7	5	38
1993	"Faces"	8	2	8	19	10	4	16	7	11	—	—	54	—
1993	"Maximum Overdrive"	15	5	16	23	13	2	35	11	18	—	—	32	—
1994	"Let the Beat Control Your Body"	6	2	8	11	11	10	10	6	11	—	—	39	29

== Writing credits ==
The following personnel all have writing credits on this album.

- Phil Wilde
- Jean-Paul de Coster
- Ray Slijngaard
- Anita Dels
- Filip Martens
- Xavier de Clayton
- Peter Bauwens
- Michael Leahy
- Jan Voermans
- Bieman
