= Edge of Heaven (disambiguation) =

Edge of Heaven is a 2014 British sitcom.

Edge of Heaven or The Edge of Heaven may also refer to:

- "The Edge of Heaven", a 1986 song by Wham!
- "Edge of Heaven", a 1995 song by Ace of Base
- The Edge of Heaven (film), a 2007 film by Fatih Akın
- "Edge of Heaven" (2 Unlimited song), 1998 song
