= Strike Gunner S.T.G =

1991 video game

- Japanese arcade flyer
- Developer: Athena
- Publishers: Arcade; Tecmo; Super NES: JP: Athena; NA: NTVIC; EU: Activision
- Designers: Naoki Morishima; Kouichi Ishibashi; Tsutomu Tabata
- Composers: Shotaro Sasaki; Kouichi Ishibashi
- Platforms: Arcade, Super NES
- Release: Arcade: JP/NA: April 1991; Super NES: JP: March 27, 1992; NA: June 1992; EU: November 1992
- Genre: Scrolling shooter
- Modes: Single-player, multiplayer

Strike Gunner S.T.G (Note: Japanese: ストライクガンナー, Hepburn: Sutoraiku Gannā) is a 1991 vertically scrolling shooter video game developed by Athena and published by Tecmo. It was released in Japan and North America in April 1991.

A port was released for the Super Nintendo Entertainment System in 1992; apart from aspect-ratio changes, it also incorporated Mode 7 effects. The European version was released (by Activision) under the title Super Strike Gunner.

Hamster Corporation acquired the rights to the game alongside Athena's catalogue, releasing the game as part of the Arcade Archives series for the Nintendo Switch and PlayStation 4 in September 2023.

== Plot ==
In the year A.D. 2008, aliens invade the Earth and obtain the support of a quisling human government. Fighter pilots Mark MacKenzie and Jane Sinclair are assigned to repel the invasion with Earth's ultimate weapon, the "Strike Gunner" aerospace fighter.

The game's first five stages take place on Earth, and pit the Strike Gunners against typical human technology, such as tanks and fighter jets. The final three stages are set beyond Earth orbit and see combat against the actual aliens, culminating in an assault on their enormous mothership orbiting beyond the Moon.

== Gameplay ==
The Special Weapon select screen (SNES version)

The game is a typical vertically-scrolling shooter. Stages feature large waves of normal enemies - ranging from helicopters to gun turrets - that only require one or two hits to destroy. Most stages contain at least one mini-boss and a screen-filling final boss; the exception is the abbreviated stage eight, which only features a handful of normal enemies, being largely an obstacle-avoidance course protecting an otherwise-defenseless mothership core.

The game offers four difficulty levels. The Strike Gunner is armed with a basic blaster weapon, which has inexhaustible ammunition and can be upgraded several times. Upgrades initially increase the rate of fire; once this is maxxed out, the weapon switches from a baseline red version to a more powerful blue one, with its own upgrades.

In addition, the player must choose a second, "special" weapon before each stage; there are several of these to choose from (ten in the arcade version, fifteen in the SNES version.) Each special weapon can be chosen only once per playthrough; this adds an element of strategy, as certain of the weapons are more effective in certain missions. If a player does not select a special weapon at the beginning of a stage, the selection menu defaults to the next still-unused option. Unlike the Strike Gunner's basic weapon, the special weapons are metered, with energy consumption roughly proportional to the weapon's power: for example, the relatively weak Autoaim Vulcan can be used almost continuously, while the Megabeam Cannon consumes the entire energy bar in a single firing.

Basic-weapon power-ups, speed boosts, and refills of the special-weapons energy bar are periodically provided by stealth bomber (or - in the space levels - space shuttles or capsules). Losing a life means the loss of all accumulated basic-weapon upgrades, but also refills the special-weapons meter; this can in some cases be done tactically.

The game supports two-player simultaneous co-op. Two-player mode is significantly less difficult, as the missions remain identical to the single-player campaign, but are tackled with the combined firepower of two Strike Gunner units; however, the challenge can be restored by choosing one of the game's higher difficulty levels. The mode also allows for an additional degree of strategy, as the two players can choose complementary special weapons. If one player wishes to quit, their Strike Gunner can be docked with the active player's, with the effect of switching back to single-player mode.

== Reception ==
Reception

Aggregate score
Aggregator	Score	
Aggregator	General	SNES
GameRankings	N/A	56.33%

Review scores
Publication	Score	
Publication	General	SNES
Nintendo Power	N/A	3.2 / 5
Super Play	N/A	66%
SNES Force	63%	55%

In May 1991, Game Machine listed Strike Gunner S.T.G as the 11th most successful table arcade unit in Japan.

The SNES port received middling reviews, most of which drew attention to its repetitive gameplay and lack of originality. Some of the special weapons, such as the Antiair Mine and Adhesive Bomb, were also noted to be useless. The September 1992 issue of Nintendo Power sarcastically hailed the game as "overhead blaster number 1,084" and called it a "mindless shooter [...] similar in style to a lot of other games", noting that "This concept is getting very tiring." More positively, the reviewers admitted to having enjoyed the game, and conceded that "For what it is [...] Strike Gunner ls well done."

The game's rock-techno soundtrack was generally well-received, with several reviews singling it out for praise.
