= Athena (game developer) =

Japanese video game developer

- Industry: Video games
- Founded: July 1987; 39 years ago
- Defunct: December 11, 2013
- Fate: Bankruptcy, rights sold to Hamster Corporation
- Headquarters: Shinjuku, Tokyo, Japan

Athena Co. Ltd. (株式会社アテナ, Kabushiki Gaisha Atena) was a Japanese video game developer, founded in July 1987.

== History ==
Due to the difficulties of recovering financially in the games market, in 2013, the Tokyo Court decided to start the company's bankruptcy process. In September 2023, it was announced that Japanese publisher Hamster Corporation would acquire the rights to Athena's library of titles which were then released through the Arcade Archives lineup, with the first being Strike Gunner S.T.G. Other titles from the company, such as Daioh and Castle of Dragon, soon followed.

== Games ==
- Biometal (Super NES, 1993)
- Blockids (PlayStation, 1996)
- Castle of Dragon (Arcade, NES, 1990)
- Crows: The Battle Action (Saturn, 1997)
- Daioh (Arcade, 1993)
- De-Block (NES, 1989)
- Dezaemon (NES, 1991)
- Dezaemon 2 (Saturn, 1997)
- Dezaemon 3D (Nintendo 64, 1998)
- Dezaemon BS Version - Sugoi Shooting (デザエモンBS版 凄いシューティング) (Satellaview, 1996)
  - Sugoi STG!! Jintai (凄いSTG!! 人体) (Apr-Aug 1996)
  - Sugoi STG-2: Crystal Guardian (May-Dec 1996)
- Dezaemon BS Version - BS-X Shooting (デザエモンBS版 BS－Xシューティング) (Satellaview, Apr-Aug 1996)
- Dezaemon DD (Nintendo 64DD, canceled)
- Dezaemon Kids! (PlayStation, 1998)
- Dezaemon Plus (デザエモンPLUS) (PlayStation, 1996)
- Family Quiz (NES, 1988)
- Gambler Densetsu Tetsuya DIGEST (PlayStation 2)
- J.J. Squawkers (Arcade, 1993)
- Joshikousei no Houkago... Pukunpa (Saturn, PlayStation, 1996)
- Kaite tukutte Asoberu Dezaemon (Super NES, 1994)
- Lutter (FDS, 1989)
- Mahjong DX II (GameCube)
- Mogura de Pon! (Game Boy, 1994)
- Money Idol Exchanger (Game Boy, 1997)
- Pocket Bowling (Game Boy Color, 1999)
- Pro Mahjong Kiwame D (プロ麻雀 極D) (Dreamcast, 2000)
- Pro Mahjong Kiwame (Nintendo 64)
- Pro Mahjong Kiwame (WonderSwan)
- Pro-Mahjong Kiwame Final (working title) (PlayStation 3, TBA)
- Pro Mahjong Kiwame Next (PlayStation 2)
- Pro Mahjong Kiwame Tengensenhen (PlayStation, 1999)
- Pro Mahjong Kiwame Tengensenhen (Goku Series) (PlayStation, 2000)
- Strike Gunner S.T.G (Arcade, 1991; Super NES, 1992)
- Super Bowling (Super NES, 1992; Nintendo 64, 1999)
- Sword Master (NES, 1990)
- Taisen: Tsume Shogi (Game Boy Color - NP, 2000)
- The Quiz Bangumi (PlayStation)
- Virtual Bowling (Virtual Boy, 1995)
- Waku Waku Volleyball (PlayStation)
- Wit's (NES, 1990)
- World Bowling (Game Boy, 1990)
- Yakōchū (Super NES)
- Yakōchū II: Satsujin Kōro (Nintendo 64, 1999)
- Yakōchū GB (Game Boy Color)
