= Pocket Bowling =

1999 video game

- Developer: Athena
- Publisher: Jaleco
- Platform: Game Boy Color
- Release: JP: 23 October 1998; NA: 9 September 1999
- Genre: Sports

Pocket Bowling is a bowling video game developed by Athena and published by Jaleco for the Game Boy Color. The game was a launch title for the Japanese release of the Game Boy Color and the first bowling game for the platform.

== Gameplay ==
A screenshot of Pocket Bowling.

Pocket Bowling is an arcade-style bowling game. Players bowl in a ten pin bowling setup by aligning the ball along the alley and adjusting curve and power. Players can select one of six characters who have different qualities in terms of power and technique. Games are played across ten frames with a maximum score of 300, including points scoring features such as strikes, spares, gutter balls and splits.

Pocket Bowling contains several modes. 'Standard Mode', for one or two players, allows players to take turns to play a game. 'Tournament Mode' allows players to select a character and compete against four computer-controlled opponents in three games across four bowling alleys in a knockout-style elimination game. 'Training Mode' allows players to practice moves on a series of customisable layouts of pins.

== Reception ==
Reception

Review scores
Publication	Score
AllGame	2/5
IGN	4/10
Game Boy Xtreme	76%
Total Game Boy	52%

Pocket Bowling received mixed reviews. Craig Harris of IGN stated that Pocket Bowling was "definitely the winner" of Game Boy Color bowling games, compared to 10 Pin Bowling, praising the "effort (that) went in to making the game as complete as possible" with several game modes. Game Boy Xtreme positively assessed the game as "surprisingly playable". In a negative review for Total Game Boy, Jem Roberts stated "there's very little to the graphics at all" and "there's hardly anything to the game itself", expecting a greater "challenge or sense of competition". Brett Alan Weiss of Allgame similarly praised the lack of difficulty, stating "it's a shame Pocket Bowling is such an easy game to master. It has crisp graphics and a professional but fun presentation. The playfield is laid out well, the controls are tight and the pins behave realistically. This would have been a fun game to play when standing in line at the bank or waiting for a lane on league night. Unfortunately, the game is not worth more than a rental."
