= Dezaemon 3D =

1998 video game

- Developer: Athena
- Publisher: Athena
- Platform: Nintendo 64
- Release: JP: 1998
- Genres: Scrolling shooter, game creation system
- Mode: Single-player

Dezaemon 3D (Note: Japanese: デザエモン3D, Hepburn: Dezaemon 3D) is a vertical scrolling shooter video game and game creation system developed and published by Athena for the Nintendo 64 in 1998. It is a spin-off of the Dezaemon series.

The game editor allows players to design their own shooting levels similar to those shown in Star Soldier: Vanishing Earth. The game has many options, such as creating the stage boss or adding a custom soundtrack for each level. It was originally developed alongside an ultimately unreleased accompanying expansion disk title for the 64DD.

It includes two sample games: "SOLID GEAR", and "USAGI-san" (Mr. Rabbit).

An English fan translation patch was released in 2024.

== Reception ==
Reception

Review score
Publication	Score
N64 Magazine	82%

N64 Magazine noted the difficulty of use in English "without any English instructions", but that "as Solid Gear ably demonstrates, Dezaemon is perfectly capable of producing a commercial-standard shooter", and that "given an English translation...we'd buy it just for the music editor." While IGN64 did not give it a full review, their coverage called it a "high quality creativity app" and placed it second on their list of "Top Nintendo 64 Imports" after Sin & Punishment, lamenting that Nintendo did not give it a US release.
