= Sword Master (video game) =

1990 video game

- Sword Master cover art
- Developer: Athena
- Publishers: JP: Athena; NA/EU: Activision
- Designers: Hironobu Tamai (Undead Tama), R. Nakashima
- Composers: Shotaro Sasaki, Kouichi Ishibashi
- Platform: Nintendo Entertainment System
- Release: JP: 21 December 1990
- Genre: Action
- Mode: Single-player

Sword Master (Japanese: ソードマスター) is a 1990 side-scrolling action game developed by Athena and published by Activision for the Nintendo Entertainment System. The game is set in a medieval fantasy setting and focuses primarily on strategic fighting using shield and sword. The game is also one of the NES games to include parallax scrolling.

== Plot ==
The Sword Master is a knight who was summoned into a kingdom of Eledar in order to defeat an evil wizard and a powerful demon god called Vishok, which he summoned and rescue of Princess Aria, the daughter of King Aragon. The game follows the knight as he marches through forest, village, and all around the enemy's castle, until both the wizard and Vishok are destroyed.

== Gameplay ==
The player must use sword and shield to battle through 7 game levels, from the forest, to a cursed town, to multiple levels of the villain's castle lair. The player encounters giant bats, wolves, skeleton warriors, evil knights, wizards, barbarians, lizard men, gargoyles, and other fierce enemies on his quest. The Sword Master can swing his sword, defend with his shield, and gather power-ups which enable him to change his form. For example, the Sword Master can transform into a mage and cast offensive magic spells.

== Release and reception ==
Reception

Review scores
Publication	Score
Total!	22%
Hippon Super!	6/10

Sword Master was released in Japan for the Family Computer on December 21, 1990.

Ichiro Tezuka in Hippon Super! found the game's atmosphere good, but the game suffered in monotonous gameplay and dull enemy design.)

It was re-released in Japan for the Retro-Bit Generations II Microconsole in 2017.
