= Yakōchū =

1995 video game

- Super Famicom cover art
- Developer: Athena
- Platforms: Super Famicom; Game Boy Color
- Release: Super Famicom: JP: 16 June 1995; Game Boy Color: JP: 22 October 1999
- Genre: Visual novel
- Mode: Single player

Yakōchū (Note: Japanese: 夜光虫; lit. Phosphorescent Animalcule) is a 1995 visual novel made by Athena for the Super Famicom. The game involves players following a text-based narrative over illustrated backgrounds with sounds that play at key moments to enhance the story. Yakōchū is about a sea captain who travels on a cruise ship, where various problems happen ranging from natural disasters, deaths of the crew members, or more supernatural events. After completing the game once, the player can restart where new narrative branch options become available, allowing new stories to be available.

Yakōchū was one of the early sound novels released following the release of Chunsoft's Otogirisō (1992) and Banshee's Last Cry (1994). Some critics in Famicom Tsūshin found the game's narrative too short, while the Hamamura Tsūshin listed the game as the "Best Picks of This Week" for June 12 to June 18, 1995. The game was later ported to the Game Boy Color as Yakōchū GB in 1999 and received a sequel for the Nintendo 64 titled Yakōchū II: Satsujin Kouro.

== Gameplay ==
In Yakōchū, players select text prompts, as seen through the green rectangle bar here.

Weekly Famitsu described Yakōchū as a sound novel. Mark Kretzschmar and Sara Raffel, authors of The History and Allure of Interactive Visual Novels, described the term used to primarily define Japanese games that rely on graphics and sounds instead of puzzles to tell a story and was more generally interchangeable with visual novels. In Yakōchū, there are narrative branches out into different stories depending on the choices the player makes.

Yakōchū was designed for control to be performed with one hand for either left-handed or right-handed players. The player can control the game through advancing the text forward and backwards and confirming options for narrative branches when prompted. After playing through the story once, restarting the game allows for new narrative branches to become available, allowing for new stories to become available to the player.

== Plot ==
In Yakōchū, the game's protagonist, named by the player, is the captain of a large cargo ship called the Daiana. Before setting off on a six-month voyage, the Captain is seen off by his lover, whom he plans to marry after the voyage. Besides the protagonist, there are other important crew members on board such as the navigator, the mechanic, a doctor.

As the ship sets sails from the shore, the crew begins to encounter various kinds of misfortunes. These can range from paranormal events, natural disasters, being attacked by monsters, and the deaths of the crew. Since there is only ocean outside the ship, the situation becomes even more alarming. The development of events depends on the player's decisions with the game having several endings.

== Development and release ==
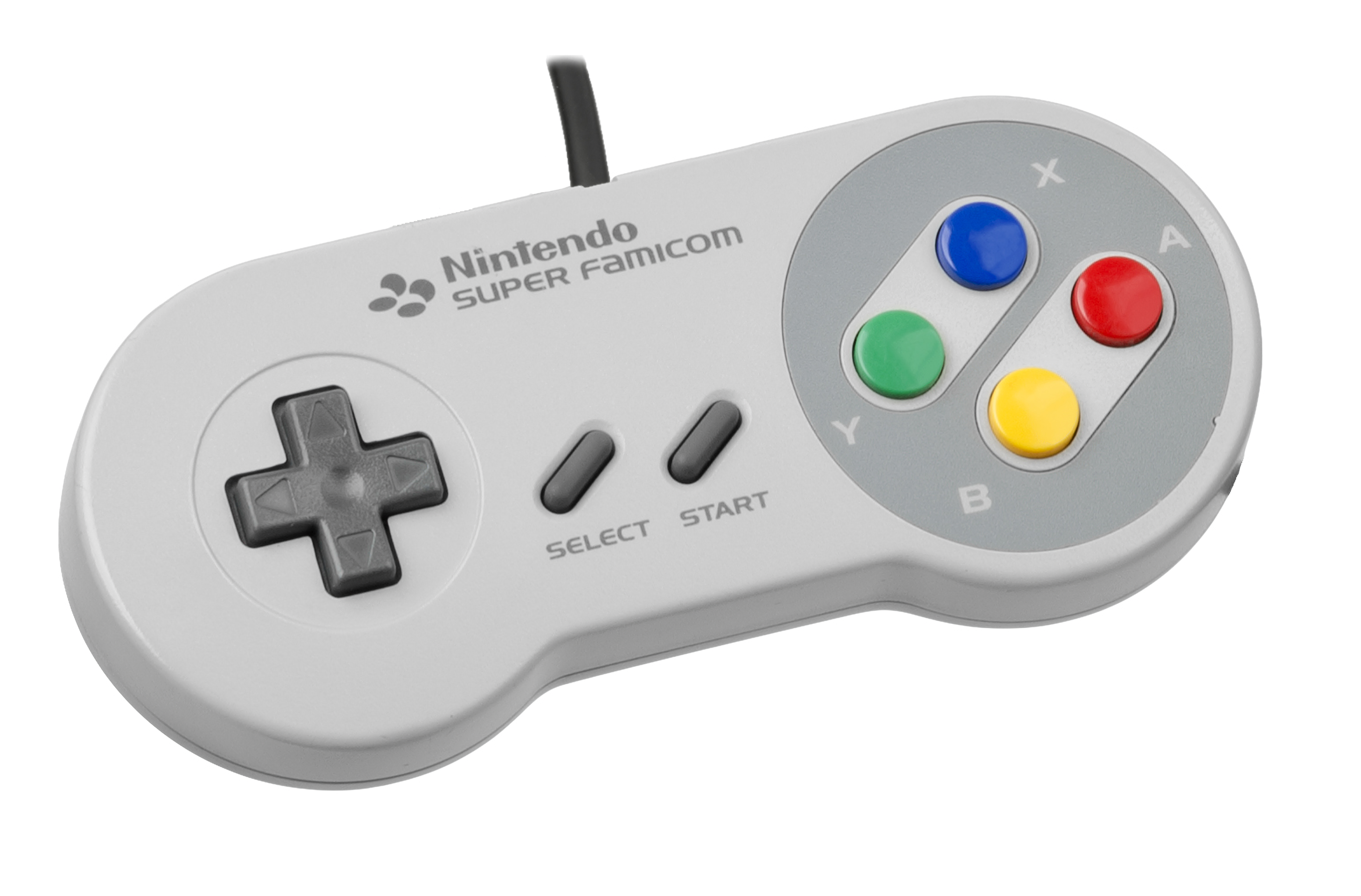
Yakōchū was designed for one-handed gameplay, with controls to operate the game mapped to either side of the Super Famicom controller.

In 1995, the Japanese video game magazine Famicom Tsūshin said that a new form of Japanese adventure games was on the rise with the advent of the sound novel genre, noting upcoming releases such as Yakōchū and Gakkou de atta Kowai Hanashi (1995). Prior to this, earlier games by Chunsoft such as Otogirisō (1992) and Banshee's Last Cry (1994) helped establish the genre.

Yakōchū was developed by Athena, a video company created by Sakae Nakamura in 1987. Nakamura recalled the development of Yakōchū, saying he wanted to create a sound novel for the company. He contacted the Japan Broadcast Writers Association and was introduced to their young writers club, which held an open call to create scenarios for Yakōchū. Nakamura said the person selected was a female office worker.

Yakōchū was released in Japan on June 16, 1995, for the Super Famicom. Nakamura said the release date for Yakōchū was lucky as it was after Banshee's Last Cry was released in November 1994 which was a hit game and quickly ran out of stock, which he said contributed to the sales of Yakōchū which had already stopped production on new copies and had to make more when requests came in.

For the port made for the Game Boy Color, additional narrative branches were added to the game. The game also added support to explain some more difficult to read Kanji characters.

== Reception and legacy ==
Reception

Review score
Publication	Score
Famicom Tsūshin	8/10, 6/10, 6/10, 5/10

Reviewing the original release, the four reviewers of Famicom Tsūshin commented on the quality of the narrative. Two reviewers found the stories short, while another said the stories lacked major climaxes. One reviewer compared the title unfavourably to Chunsoft's Banshee's Last Cry, which they felt was superior due to its puzzle-solving elements. In the same magazine, critic Hamamura Tsūshin listed the game as the "Best Picks of This Week" for June 12 to June 18, 1995, saying it would potentially be what audiences who have completed Otogirisō have been looking for. In Game Criticism the reviewer found there were too few variations on the story and that all the stories were too short.

In the Japanese book Perfect Guide to Nostalgic Super Famicom (2016), the game was included in their list of the top six horror games for the Super Famicom. Their overview said that there was no doubt that it was a good game, but said that if played consistently, some players may find it lacking due to its short run time.

On October 22, 1999, two other Yakōchū titles were released. The first was a port of the original game to the Game Boy Color as Yakōchū GB and the second was a sequel titled Yakōchū II: Satsujin Kouro for the Nintendo 64. While being promoted as a sequel, the Nintendo 64 game does not have any returning characters or scenarios from Yakōchū.

== See also ==
- List of Super Nintendo Entertainment System games
- Video games in Japan
