= Daioh =

1993 video game

- North American arcade flyer
- Developer: Athena
- Publisher: Sammy Corporation
- Platform: Arcade
- Release: NA: May 1993; JP: June 1993
- Genres: Scrolling shooter, shoot 'em up
- Modes: Single-player, multiplayer

Daioh (Note: Japanese: 大王, Hepburn: Daiō) is a 1993 vertically scrolling shooter video game developed by Athena and published by Sammy Corporation for arcades. It was released in North America in May 1993 and Japan in June 1993.

Hamster Corporation acquired the game's rights alongside Athena's catalogue, releasing the game as part of their Arcade Archives series for the Nintendo Switch and PlayStation 4 in November 2023.

== Gameplay ==
The player controls a fighter jet which navigates levels and defeats enemies while dodging their bullets. While the Japanese version has a shooting and bomb button which allows the player to switch between ammunition and bombs by collecting power-ups, the American version unusually provides 6 buttons for each type of ammunition and bomb, while the power-ups merely grant points to the player; the player must strategically switch between attacks to defeat giant boss enemies at the end of each level.
