= II (2 Unlimited album) =

Studio album by 2 Unlimited
- Released: 25 May 1998
- Studio: Soundsational Studios
- Genre: Eurodance, techno, dance-pop
- Length: 42:27
- Label: Byte Records
- Producer: Jean-Paul de Coster (exec. prod.), Phil Wilde, et al.

2 Unlimited chronology
Hits Unlimited (1995)	II (1998)	The Complete History (2004)

II is the fourth and final studio album by Belgian/Dutch Eurodance band 2 Unlimited. The record is the only album to feature Romy and Marjon as vocalists and was only released in certain European territories.

Despite not garnering a UK release, it did spawn a hit single: "Wanna Get Up", which reached number 38 in Britain.

== Track listing ==
1. "Wanna Get Up" – 3:14
2. "The Edge of Heaven" – 4:14
3. "Never Surrender" – 4:31
4. "Closer 2U" – 5:14
5. "Back into the Groove" – 4:00
6. "Someone to Get There" – 5:25
7. "I Am Ready" – 3:19
8. "Move On Up" – 4:37
9. "Let's Celebrate" – 3:56
10. "Be Free Tonight" – 3:50

In some European countries, "Wanna Get Up", "The Edge of Heaven" and "Never Surrender" were released as singles.

== Credits ==
- Backing Vocals [Background Vocals] – Marjon van Iwaarden (tracks: 1 to 5, 9), Romy van Ooyen (tracks: 1 to 5, 9)
- Guitar – Eric Melaerts (tracks: 5, 8, 9)
- Instruments [All], Programmed By, Arranged By – Phil Wilde
- Layout – Seven Productions
- Lyrics By – Jean-Paul De Coster (tracks: 1, 2, 4 to 7, 9, 10), Peter Bauwens (tracks: 1, 3 to 6, 9), Phil Wilde (tracks: 1 to 10), Steven Tracey (tracks: 1, 3, 6 to 9), Xavier Clayton (tracks: 2, 5, 10)
- Mastered By – Rene Schardt
- Mixed By [Mix Engineer] – Peter Bulkens
- Photography By – Roger Dyckmans, Soto & Landé
- Producer – Wilde & De Coster
- Producer [Vocal] – Peter Bauwens

== Charts ==
Chart performance for II
Chart (1998)	Peak position
Hungarian Albums (MAHASZ)	36
