= BioMetal (video game) =

1993 video game

- North American cover art
- Developer: Athena
- Publishers: JP: Athena; WW: Activision
- Composers: JP: Yoshio Nagashima; WW: 2 Unlimited Ali Lexa John Rodriguez
- Platform: Super NES
- Release: JP: March 19, 1993; EU: 1993; NA: November 1993
- Genre: Scrolling shooter
- Mode: Single-player

BioMetal is a single-player horizontally scrolling shooter released on June 1, 1993, for the Super NES.

The game features six different weapons to combat the BioMetals, an extraterrestrial race determined to destroy the human race. The gameplay is very similar to that of the R-Type series, with the final boss even greatly resembling and behaving similarly to that series' iconic boss enemy Dobkeratops.

The European and North American versions of BioMetal feature a soundtrack entirely created of four remixed songs of techno group 2 Unlimited from their 1991 album, Get Ready!. The Japanese version of the game features an entirely different soundtrack.

A sequel called BioMetal Gust was released for the Saturn in 1997, included with the Dezaemon 2 pack.

== Plot ==
Even in the first level, the enemies come after the player in a fast and furious manner.

It is the year GC 232 (Galaxy Century Year 232). A huge war that had begun years and years before has divided the Milky Way and all of its natural resources have been exhausted. The Milky Way Galactic Council is forced to send a fleet of starships to a nearby planet by the name of UP457 in search of any resources that can replenish the ones lost during the battle. During this mission, the fleet is destroyed by a race of half-machine, half-animal aliens referred to as "BIOMETAL" by the Galactic Council.

One of the council's supercomputers then calculates that the number of these "BIOMETALS" is increasing rapidly and will have the Milky Way completely taken over within 32 hours. The Halbard's crew, young pilot Kid Ray and biologist Anita (a reference to the names of the two lead singers of 2 Unlimited, who provided the music for the North American/European version of the game), along with their fleet, WASP, are assigned to eliminate the hostile threat on UP457.

== Gameplay ==
Weapon power-ups are gained by destroying pods and picking up the released power-ups, which cycle through the various weapon types as in Raiden. Some weapons cancel each other out. The player also has a shield in the form of four spinning orbs that circle around the ship when engaged. Charge power is drained when the shield is active. The shield can be used as protection against enemy fire.

== Reception ==
Reception

Review scores
Publication	Score
AllGame	1.5/5
Electronic Gaming Monthly	6/10
Famitsu	6/10, 5/10, 6/10, 5/10
GamesMaster	64%
Hyper	71%
Official Nintendo Magazine	83/100
Super Play	71%
Total!	80%
Electronic Games	77%
Games World	53/100
Hippon Super!	6/10
Marukatsu Super Famicom	7/10, 7/10, 8/10, 6/10
Nintendo Magazine System	53/100
Super Action	70%
Super Control	44%
The Super Famicom	64/100
Super Gamer	80%
Super Pro	70/100
VideoGames	8/10

BioMetal received an average reception from critics.
