= Never Surrender (2 Unlimited song) =

Single by 2 Unlimited

from the album II
- Released: 31 August 1998
- Recorded: 1998
- Label: Byte
- Songwriters: Phil Wilde; Peter Bauwens; Steven Tracey
- Producers: Phil Wilde; Jean-Paul De Coster

2 Unlimited singles chronology
"Edge of Heaven" (1998)	"Never Surrender" (1998)	"No Limit 2.3" (2003)

Music video
- "Never Surrender" on YouTube

"Never Surrender" is a song recorded by Belgian/Dutch Eurodance band 2 Unlimited. It was released as the third and final single from them to feature Romy van Oojen and Marjon van Iwaarden as the lead vocalists. It was also the third and final single to be taken from 2 Unlimited's fourth studio album, II. The single scored moderate chart success on the Eurochart Hot 100 at #40, #5 in Spain and #23 in Belgium. "Never Surrender" did not obtain a UK release, unlike the previous single "Edge of Heaven".

== Music video ==
The music video for "Never Surrender" was directed by Jon Bont.

== Track listing ==
Belgian CD single

1. "Never Surrender" (Radio Edit) (3:55)
2. "Never Surrender" (Extended) (6:22)

Spanish CD maxi

1. "Never Surrender" (Radio Edit) (3:55)
2. "Never Surrender" (Extended) (6:22)
3. "Never Surrender" (Perpetual Motion Remix) (8:01)
4. "Never Surrender" (Milk Inc. Remix) (5:26)
5. "Never Surrender" (Unlimited Mix) (6:51)
6. "Never Surrender" (Unlimited Dub Mix) (4:46)
7. "Never Surrender" (AJ Duncan's Wild Side Remix) (6:40)

Belgian and Spanish 12" maxi

1. "Never Surrender" (Perpetual Motion Remix) (8:01)
2. "Never Surrender" (Milk Inc. Remix) (5:26)
3. "Never Surrender" (Unlimited Mix) (6:51)
4. "Never Surrender" (Unlimited Dub Mix) (4:46)
5. "Never Surrender" (AJ Duncan's Wild Side Remix) (6:40)

== Charts ==
Chart (1998–1999)	Peak position
Australia (ARIA)	121
Belgium (Ultratop)	23
Europe (Eurochart Hot 100)	40
Netherlands (Dutch Top 40 Tipparade)	4
Netherlands (Single Top 100)	59
Spain (AFYVE)	5
