= BioMetals (journal) =

- Discipline: Biochemistry
- Language: English
- Edited by: Isabelle Michaud-Soret and Christopher Rensing

Publication details
- Former name: Biology of Metals
- History: 1988-present
- Publisher: Springer Science+Business Media
- Frequency: Bimonthly
- Impact factor: 2.949 (2020)

Standard abbreviations
- ISO 4: BioMetals

Indexing
- CODEN: BOMEEH
- ISSN: 0966-0844 (print); 1572-8773 (web)
- LCCN: 94646562
- OCLC no.: 757642186

Links
- Journal homepage; Online archive

BioMetals is a bimonthly peer-reviewed scientific journal covering the role of metal ions in biological systems. It is published by Springer Science+Business Media and the editor-in-chief are Isabelle Michaud-Soret and Christopher Rensing. Associate editors are Hans Vogel, Hajo Haase and Shelley Payne. The journal was established in 1988 as Biology of Metals and obtained its current name in 1992. It is the official journal of the International Biometals Society. According to the Journal Citation Reports, the journal has a 2020 impact factor of 2.949.
