= Spread Your Love (2 Unlimited song) =

1996 single by 2 Unlimited

Single by 2 Unlimited

from the album Hits Unlimited
- Released: 6 May 1996
- Recorded: 1995
- Length: 4:43; 3:50 (single version)
- Label: Byte; Zyx
- Songwriters: Phil Wilde; Peter Bauwens; Ray Slijngaard; Anita Dels
- Producers: Phil Wilde; Jean-Paul De Coster

2 Unlimited singles chronology
"Jump for Joy" (1996)	"Spread Your Love" (1996)	"Wanna Get Up" (1998)

Music video
- "Spread Your Love" on YouTube

"Spread Your Love" is a song recorded by Belgian/Dutch Eurodance band 2 Unlimited. It was released in May 1996 by labels Byte and Zyx Records as the third and final new single from their greatest hits compilation album, Hits Unlimited (1995). The song is co-written by band members Anita Dels and Ray Slijngaard with Peter Bauwens and co-producer Phil Wilde, and scored chart success in some European countries. It reached its highest peak in Spain, peaking at number ten, and also charted in the Netherlands at number 13. The single was not released in the United Kingdom.

"Spread Your Love" was only released in a few European territories and a studio video was not filmed for the track. Instead, footage of live performances fused with computer generated graphics were used. By the time this single was released, the duo had announced their split.

== Track listing ==
- CD single
1. "Spread Your Love" (Radio Edit) (3:50)
2. "Spread Your Love" (Digidance Happy Hardcore Edit) (3:51)
- CD maxi
1. "Spread Your Love" (Radio Edit) (3:50)
2. "Spread Your Love" (Digidance Happy Hardcore Edit) (3:51)
3. "Spread Your Love" (Tokapi's Radio Edit) (3:17)
4. "Spread Your Love" (Extended) (7:21)
5. "Spread Your Love" (Sash! Remix) (5:47)
6. "Spread Your Love" (La Casa Di Tokapi) (5:32)
- 7" single
1. "Spread Your Love" (Radio Edit) (3:50)
2. "Spread Your Love" (Tokapi's Radio Edit) (3:17)
- 12" maxi
1. "Spread Your Love" (Sash! Remix) (5:47)
2. "Spread Your Love" (Itty-Bitty-Boozy-Woozy's Blue Love Mix) (6:01)
3. "Spread Your Love" (Digidance Happy Hardcore Extended Mix) (5:38)
4. "Spread Your Love" (La Casa Di Tokapi) (5:32)

== Charts ==
Chart (1996)	Peak position
Belgium (Ultratop 50 Flanders)	19
Belgium (Ultratop 50 Wallonia)	25
Europe (Eurochart Hot 100)	92
Netherlands (Dutch Top 40)	17
Netherlands (Single Top 100)	13
Spain (AFYVE)	10
Sweden (Sverigetopplistan)	45
