= Wanna Get Up =

1998 single by 2 Unlimited

Single by 2 Unlimited

from the album II
- Released: 9 March 1998 (Netherlands); 29 June 1998 (UK)
- Recorded: 1998
- Genre: Eurodance
- Label: Byte; Big Life; Dos or Die
- Songwriters: Phil Wilde; Jean-Paul De Coster; Peter Bauwens; Steven Tracey
- Producers: Phil Wilde; Jean-Paul De Coster

2 Unlimited singles chronology
"Spread Your Love" (1996)	"Wanna Get Up" (1998)	"Edge of Heaven" (1998)

Music video
- "Wanna Get Up" on YouTube

UK cover

"Wanna Get Up" is a song recorded by Belgian/Dutch Eurodance band 2 Unlimited. It was released in 1998 as the debut single from the band to feature Romy van Oojen and Marjon van Iwaarden as the lead vocalists, and was also the lead single from 2 Unlimited's fourth studio album, II (1998). Romy and Marjon were picked out of 150 candidates at various auditions in Holland, Belgium and the United Kingdom.

In an interview with Music & Media, producer De Coster commented on the song: "With the raps deleted, the songs have a more conventional 'verse-chorus-bridge' pop structure. We wanted radio to get on board at once. These days it's much harder to cross over from the clubs to radio than it was seven years ago when we started. Radio and clubs lead separate lives now." Dutch music television channel TMF made the music video of "Wanna Get Up", which was directed by Jan Russel, a "Superclip", the station's highest rotation with 60 plays a week.

== Release and reception ==
The release scored chart success in some European countries, most notably peaking at number seven in Belgium, number ten in the Netherlands and number 16 in Finland. "Wanna Get Up" was the only single with the new vocalists to ever chart in the UK, where it debuted at number 38. On the Eurochart Hot 100, the song reached number 27. In Canada, the single peaked at number-one on the dance music chart. The single was originally promoted as a white label with just a II sticker on it.

BBC Radio 1 DJ Judge Jules liked the track so much that he played it for four weeks in a row on his show. When he found out that it was a 2 Unlimited single, he no longer supported the track.

The single came in two versions: the original pop version, which was markedly different from the band's previous eurodance sound; and a remix by German DJ Sash!. It was the Sash! version that was promoted as the main single in the UK.

== Track listing ==
- CD single
1. "Wanna Get Up" (Original Edit) (3:15)
2. "Wanna Get Up" (Sash! Extended) (5:58)
- Belgian CD maxi
1. "Wanna Get Up" (Original Edit) (3:15)
2. "Wanna Get Up" (Sash! Extended) (5:58)
3. "Wanna Get Up" (Rhythm Masters Mix) (6:18)
4. "Wanna Get Up" (Natural Born Grooves Mix) (5:20)
- German CD maxi
1. "Wanna Get Up" (Sash! Video Mix) (3:16)
2. "Wanna Get Up" (Original Edit) (3:16)
3. "Wanna Get Up" (Sash! Extended Mix) (5:58)
4. "Wanna Get Up" (Original Extended Mix) (3:46)
- UK CD maxi
1. "Wanna Get Up" (Original Edit) (3:17)
2. "Wanna Get Up" (Sash! Extended) (5:58)
3. "Wanna Get Up" (Rhythm Masters Mix) (6:21)
4. "Wanna Get Up" (Natural Born Grooves Mix) (5:23)
5. "Wanna Get Up" (AJ Duncan Mix) (6:48)
6. "Wanna Get Up" (Rob B's Mix) (7:17)
- Belgian 12" maxi
1. "Wanna Get Up" (Sash! Extended) (5:58)
2. "Wanna Get Up" (Rhythm Masters Mix) (6:18)
3. "Wanna Get Up" (Natural Born Grooves Mix) (5:20)
4. "Wanna Get Up" (AJ Duncan Mix) (6:45)
- UK 12" maxi
1. "Wanna Get Up" (Sash! Extended) (5:58)
2. "Wanna Get Up" (Natural Born Grooves Mix) (5:20)
3. "Wanna Get Up" (Rhythm Masters Mix) (6:18)
4. "Wanna Get Up" (Rob B's Mix) (5:45)

== Charts ==
=== Weekly charts ===
Chart (1998)	Peak position
Australia (ARIA)	128
Belgium (Ultratop 50 Flanders)	7
Belgium Dance (Ultratop)	5
Canada Dance/Urban (RPM)	1
Europe (Eurochart Hot 100)	27
Finland (Suomen virallinen lista)	16
France (SNEP)	70
Germany (GfK)	88
Netherlands (Dutch Top 40)	10
Netherlands (Single Top 100)	15
Quebec (ADISQ)	31
Scottish Singles Sales (Official Charts)	28
Sweden (Sverigetopplistan)	58
UK Singles (Official Charts)	38
UK Dance (Official Charts)	27
UK Indie (Official Charts)	3

=== Year-end charts ===
Chart (1998)	Position
Belgium (Ultratop Flanders)	56
Canada Dance/Urban (RPM)	21
Netherlands (Dutch Top 40)	78
