= The Complete History (album) =

Compilation album by 2 Unlimited
- Released: 9 February 2004
- Genre: Eurodance
- Label: ZYX Music
- Producer: Jean-Paul de Coster (exec. prod.), Phil Wilde, et al.

2 Unlimited chronology
II (1998)	The Complete History (2004)

The Complete History is a compilation album released by 2 Unlimited on February 9, 2004 through ZYX Music label The record was released in two formats: as a single CD edition, and as a CD/DVD packaged in a DVD case. The package was released in Germany, and then in Brazil in 2005.

== Track listing ==
=== CD ===
1. Tribal Dance (Rap Edit) (3:41)
2. No Limit (Radio Edit) (3:16)
3. The Real Thing (Radio Edit) (3:40)
4. Faces (Radio Edit) (3:32)
5. Twilight Zone (7" Vocal) (4:09)
6. Maximum Overdrive (Radio Edit) (3:42)
7. Let The Beat Control Your Body (Airplay Edit) (3:40)
8. Get Ready For This (Radio Edit) (3:44)
9. No One (Radio Edit) (3:27)
10. Shelter For A Rainy Day (Extended Mix) (5:14)
11. Desire (Album Version) (4:24)
12. Eternally Yours (Album Version) (4:24)
13. Tribal Dance 2.4 (Revil O. Remix) (7:33)
14. No Limit 2.3 (Master Blaster Remix) (5:25)
15. Murphys Megamix (Faces, Tribal Dance, Maximum Overdrive, Get Ready For This, No Limit) (6:25)
16. Faces (Automatic Breakbeat Remix) (5:32)

=== DVD ===
1. No Limit (3:45)
2. Faces (3:30)
3. Maximum Overdrive (3:26)
4. Let The Beat Control Your Body (3:43)
5. The Real Thing (3:40)
6. No One (3:27)
7. Magic Friend (3:46)
8. Workaholic (3:40)
9. Get Ready For This (Orchestral Mix) (2:55)
10. Tribal Dance (No Rap) (3:44)
11. Nothing Like The Rain (4:01)
12. Here I Go (3:18)
13. Jump For Joy (3:42)
14. Do What's Good For Me (3:52)
15. Spread Your Love (3:43)
16. No Limit 2.3 (3:10)
17. "Countdown Special" (Bonus) (25:27)
