= Edge of Heaven (2 Unlimited song) =

1998 single by 2 Unlimited

Single by 2 Unlimited

from the album II
- Released: 15 June 1998
- Recorded: 1998
- Genre: Eurodance; eurohouse
- Length: 4:14
- Label: Byte; Big Life; Dos or Die
- Songwriters: Phil Wilde; Jean-Paul De Coster; Xavier Clayton
- Producers: Phil Wilde; Jean-Paul De Coster

2 Unlimited singles chronology
"Wanna Get Up" (1998)	"Edge of Heaven" (1998)	"Never Surrender" (1998)

Music video
- "Edge of Heaven" on YouTube

UK cover

"Edge of Heaven" is a song recorded by Belgian/Dutch Eurodance band 2 Unlimited. It was released in June 1998 as the second single to feature Romy van Ooijen and Marjon van Iwaarden as the lead vocalists. It is taken from 2 Unlimited's fourth studio album, II. The release scored chart success notably peaking at #7 in Belgium, #8 in Spain and #34 on the Eurochart Hot 100.

The single was due to be released in the UK in August 1998, but its release was cancelled.

== Music video ==
The music video for "Edge of Heaven" was directed by Mike Bell.

== Track listing ==
Belgian CD single

1. "Edge Of Heaven" (Radio Edit) (4:14)
2. "Edge Of Heaven" (Extended Dub) (6:54)

Belgian CD maxi

1. "Edge Of Heaven" (Radio Edit) (4:14)
2. "Edge Of Heaven" (Extended Dub) (6:54)
3. "Edge Of Heaven" (Sharp Funky Driver Remix) (8:54)
4. "Edge Of Heaven" (Fiocco Remix) (5:25)
5. "Edge Of Heaven" (Highlight Over The Edge Remix) (6:00)

UK CD maxi

1. "Edge Of Heaven" (Radio Edit) (4:14)
2. "Edge Of Heaven" (Sharp Funky Driver Remix) (8:54)
3. "Edge Of Heaven" (Extended Dub) (6:54)

Belgian 12" maxi

1. "Edge Of Heaven" (Extended Dub) (6:54)
2. "Edge Of Heaven" (Sharp Funky Driver Remix) (8:54)
3. "Edge Of Heaven" (Fiocco Remix) (5:25)
4. "Edge Of Heaven" (Highlight Over The Edge Remix) (6:00)

UK 12" maxi

1. "Edge Of Heaven" (Sharp Funky Driver Remix) (8:54)
2. "Edge Of Heaven" (Radio Edit) (4:14)
3. "Edge Of Heaven" (Extended Dub) (6:54)

== Charts ==
Chart (1998)	Peak position
Belgium (Ultratop)	7
Belgium Dance (Ultratop)	9
Europe (Eurochart Hot 100)	34
Netherlands (Dutch Top 40)	35
Netherlands (Single Top 100)	41
Spain (AFYVE)	8
