= Get Ready! =

- Standard artwork

Studio album by 2 Unlimited
- Released: 24 February 1992
- Recorded: 1991–92
- Genre: Eurodance; techno; dance-pop
- Length: 59:48
- Label: Byte, ZYX, PWL
- Producer: Phile Wilde, Jean-Paul de Coster, Peter Bauwens

2 Unlimited chronology
Get Ready! (1992)	No Limits! (1993)

Singles from Get Ready!
- 1. "Get Ready for This" Released: 23 September 1991; 2. "Twilight Zone" Released: 13 January 1992; 3. "Workaholic" Released: 20 April 1992; 4. "The Magic Friend" Released: 3 August 1992

Get Ready! is the debut studio album by Belgian/Dutch Eurodance group 2 Unlimited. The album includes 2 Unlimited's breakthrough worldwide hit single "Get Ready for This".

== Release and reception ==
The album reached #12 in the Netherlands and #37 in the UK Albums Chart. Despite the moderate chart success, 2 Unlimited was one of the few bands to gain access to the difficult American market. Although peaking at just #197 on the US Billboard 200, the album still proved consistent in sales, eventually going Gold for sales in excess of 500,000.

The exclamation mark was dropped from the title for the US and UK releases of Get Ready!

== Content ==
The original album is divided in three parts: Vocal, Instrumental and Romantic. The US and UK versions of the album deleted most of the instrumental tracks in favor of two extended versions of the main singles. The US and Canadian versions of Get Ready! contain the track "Pacific Walk" which was omitted from the European releases.

Ironically the success in the Dutch market was initially limited, since the band mainly relied on their Belgian producers, who preferred to focus their attention on the British market.

== Track listing ==
=== European album ===
1. "Get Ready for This" (3:46)
2. "Twilight Zone" (4:11)
3. "The Magic Friend" (4:32)
4. "Contrast" (3:42)
5. "Rougher Than the Average" (4:09)
6. "Workaholic" (4:12)
7. "Delight" (3:42)
8. "Get Ready for This" (Rio & Le Jean Remix) (3:12)
9. "Twilight Zone" (Rave Version Edit) (4:07)
10. "The Magic Friend" (Instrumental) [retains some chorus vocals] (3:32)
11. "Rougher Than the Average" (Instrumental) (4:09)
12. "Workaholic" (Censored Intro) (4:12)
13. "Delight" (Instrumental) (3:42)
14. "Desire" (4:25)
15. "Eternally Yours" (4:26)
- The LP version reshuffles the tracks and drops the instrumental part.
- Tracks 1–7 labelled as "Vocal Part", tracks 8–13 as "Instrumental Part" and tracks 14–15 as "Romantic Part".

=== UK album ===
1. "Get Ready for This" (Orchestral Mix) (5:31)
2. "Twilight Zone" (Rave Version) (5:41)
3. "The Magic Friend" (Instrumental) (3:32)
4. "Contrast" (3:42)
5. "Twilight Zone" (Rap Version) (4:11)
6. "Delight" (No Rap Version) (3:42)
7. "Workaholic" (No Rap Version) (4:12)
8. "Rougher Than the Average" (Instrumental) (4:09)
9. "Delight" (Rap Version) (3:42)
10. "The Magic Friend" (Rap Version) (4:32)
11. "Rougher Than the Average" (Rap Version) (4:09)
12. "Get Ready for This" (Rap Version) (3:46)
13. "Eternally Yours" (4:26)
14. "Desire" (4:25)
- The vocal tracks are labelled as "Rap".
- The instrumental tracks are not labelled as such.
- The LP and cassette versions drop tracks 13 and 14 (the "Romantic" Part).

=== US and Canada album ===
1. "Get Ready for This" (Orchestral Mix) (5:31)
2. "Twilight Zone" (Club Mix) (5:55)
3. "The Magic Friend" (4:32)
4. "Contrast" (3:42)
5. "Desire" (4:25)
6. "Pacific Walk" (3:05)
7. "Workaholic" (4:12)
8. "Rougher Than the Average" (4:09)
9. "Delight" (3:42)
10. "Eternally Yours" (4:26)
11. "Twilight Zone" (Rave Version Edit) (4:11)
12. "Get Ready for This" (Vocal Version) (3:46)
13. "The Magic Friend" ("Instrumental") (3:32)
14. "Workaholic" ("Instrumental") (4:12)
- A limited double LP version drops tracks 7, 13 & 14 but adds the instrumental version of "Rougher Than the Average" and extended mixes for "Workaholic" (Extended Mix and Rio & Le Jean Remix), "Twilight Zone" (Hardcore Remix) and "Get Ready for This" (Rio & Le Jean Remix '92).
- Track 2 is an re-edit of the "Not Enough Version" with the intro from the "Rave Version" added.

=== Australian album ===
1. "Get Ready for This" (Vocal Version) (3:46)
2. "Twilight Zone" (Not Enough Version - Edit) (4:11)
3. "The Magic Friend" (4:32)
4. "Contrast" (3:42)
5. "Rougher Than the Average" (4:09)
6. "Workaholic" (4:12)
7. "Delight" (3:42)
8. "Get Ready for This" (Orchestral Mix - Edit) (2:54)
9. "Twilight Zone" (PWL 7" Edit) (3:15)
10. "The Magic Friend" (Instrumental) (3:32)
11. "Rougher Than the Average" (Instrumental) (4:09)
12. "Workaholic" (PWL Mix) (3:07)
13. "Delight" (Instrumental) (3:42)
14. "Desire" (4:25)
15. "Eternally Yours" (4:26)

== Charts ==
=== Weekly charts ===
Chart (1992–1993)	Peak position
Australian Albums (ARIA)	10
Dutch Albums (Album Top 100)	12
Canadian Albums (RPM)	17
Hungarian Albums (MAHASZ)	22
Japanese Albums (Oricon)	85
Swedish Albums (Sverigetopplistan)	27
UK Albums (OCC)	37
US Billboard 200	197

=== Year-end charts ===
Chart (1993)	Position
Dutch Albums (Album Top 100)	90

== Certifications and sales ==
Region	Certification	Certified units/sales
Australia (ARIA)	Gold	35,000^{^}
United States (RIAA)	Gold	500,000^{^}
Summaries
Worldwide	—	2,000,000
^{^} Shipments figures based on certification alone.
