= Jump for Joy (song) =

1996 single by 2 Unlimited

"Jump For Joy"

Single by 2 Unlimited

from the album Hits Unlimited
- Released: 29 January 1996
- Recorded: 1995
- Genre: Eurodance
- Length: 3:42
- Label: Byte
- Songwriters: Phil Wilde; Ray Slijngaard; Anita Dels
- Producers: Phil Wilde; Jean-Paul De Coster

2 Unlimited singles chronology
"Do What's Good for Me" (1995)	"Jump For Joy" (1996)	"Spread Your Love" (1996)

Music video
- "Jump For Joy" on YouTube

Japanese cover

"Jump for Joy" is a song recorded by Belgian/Dutch Eurodance band 2 Unlimited, released in January 1996, by Byte Records, as the second single from their greatest hits compilation album, Hits Unlimited (1995). The song is written by band members Ray Slijngaard and Anita Dels with producer Phil Wilde who produced it with Jean-Paul De Coster. It was a successful top-10 hit in the Netherlands and Spain. The accompanying music video was directed by Max & Dania.

== Chart performance ==
"Jump for Joy" became a hit in several European countries, scoring chart success in the Netherlands and Spain, peaking at numbers seven and four. Additionally, the song was a top-20 hit in Belgium, reaching numbers 12 and 19 in Flanders and Wallonia, respectively. In Germany and Sweden, it became a top-40 hit, peaking at numbers 39 and 32, and it also charted in Denmark and France. "Jump for Joy" did not obtain a UK release, unlike the previous single "Do What's Good for Me". On the Eurochart Hot 100, where this was the last 2 Unlimited song to chart, it peaked at number 29 in its fourth week on the chart, on 9 March 1996. Outside Europe, the song reached number 22 on the RPM dance chart in Canada and number 137 in Australia.

== Music video ==
The music video for "Jump for Joy" was directed by Max Giwa and Dania Pasquini, known as just Max & Dania. It was shot in January 1996 and features Anita and Ray performing in a parking garage. Throughout the video, several people performs, jumping, and in some scenes they soars in the air above the ground. Anita wears black furs, a black dress and black gloves. It is also the only video with her having dreadlocks. "Jump for Joy" was the last single with 2 Unlimited in their Anita and Ray guise released with a proper video before their break up at the end of 1996. The video was later made available on 2 Unlimited's official YouTube channel in 2014, and had generated more than 8.6 million views as of February 2026.

== Track listing ==
- CD single, France & Benelux
1. "Jump for Joy" (Edit) (3:42)
2. "Jump for Joy" (Digidance Happy Hardcore Edit) (3:19)
- CD maxi, France
1. "Jump for Joy" (Edit) (3:42)
2. "Jump for Joy" (Digidance Happy Hardcore Edit) (3:19)
3. "Jump for Joy" (Armand's Dutch Touch Mix) (7:51)
4. "MTV Partyzone Megamix" (4:55)
- CD maxi
1. "Jump for Joy" (Edit) (3:42)
2. "Jump for Joy" (Digidance Happy Hardcore Edit) (3:19)
3. "Jump for Joy" (Armand's Dutch Touch Mix) (7:51)
4. "Jump for Joy" (Itty-Bitty-Boozy-Woozy's Dub For Joy) (5:25)
5. "MTV Partyzone Megamix" (4:55)
- Cassette, Australia & New Zealand
1. "Jump for Joy" (Edit) (3:42)
2. "Jump for Joy" (Digidance Happy Hardcore Edit) (3:19)
3. "Jump for Joy" (Armand's Dutch Touch Mix) (7:51)
4. "Jump for Joy" (Itty-Bitty-Boozy-Woozy's Dub For Joy) (5:25)
5. "MTV Partyzone Megamix" (4:55)
- 7" single, Germany
1. "Jump for Joy" (Radio Edit) (3:42)
2. "Jump for Joy" (Digidance Happy Hardcore Edit) (3:19)
- 12" maxi, Germany
1. "Jump for Joy" (Digidance Happy Hardcore Edit) (3:19)
2. "Jump for Joy" (Armand's Dutch Touch Mix) (7:51)
3. "Jump for Joy" (Itty-Bitty-Boozy-Woozy's Dub For Joy) (5:25)
4. "MTV Partyzone Megamix" (4:55)
- 12" maxi, Greece
1. "Jump for Joy" (Edit) (3:42)
2. "Jump for Joy" (Digidance Happy Hardcore Edit) (3:19)
3. "Jump for Joy" (Armand's Dutch Touch Mix) (7:51)
4. "Jump for Joy" (Itty-Bitty-Boozy-Woozy's Dub For Joy) (5:25)
- 12" maxi, France
1. "Jump for Joy" (Digidance Happy Hardcore Mix) (5:47)
2. "Jump for Joy" (Armand's Dutch Touch Mix) (7:51)
3. "Jump for Joy" (Itty-Bitty-Boozy-Woozy's Dub 4 Joy) (5:25)
4. "Jump for Joy" (Edit) (3:42)

12" Vinyl, Benelux & Spain

1. "Jump for Joy" (Digidance Happy Hardcore Mix) (5:47)
2. "Jump for Joy" (Edit) (3:42)
3. "Jump for Joy" (Armand's Dutch Touch Mix) (7:51)
4. "Jump for Joy" (Itty-Bitty-Boozy-Woozy's Dub 4 Joy) (5:25)
- 12" Vinyl, Italy
1. "Jump for Joy" (Digidance Happy Hardcore Mix) (5:47)
2. "Jump for Joy" (Edit) (3:42)
3. "Jump for Joy" (Digidance Happy Hardcore Edit) (3:19)
4. "Jump for Joy" (Armand's Dutch Touch Mix) (7:51)
5. "Jump for Joy" (Itty-Bitty-Boozy-Woozy's Dub For Joy) (5:25)
6. "MTV Partyzone Megamix" (4:55)
- 12" Vinyl, Canada
1. "Jump for Joy" (Armand's Dutch Touch Mix) (7:51)
2. "Jump for Joy" (Original Edit) (3:42)
3. "Jump for Joy" (Itty-Bitty-Boozy-Woozy's Dub For Joy) (5:25)
4. "Jump for Joy" (Digidance Happy Hardcore Edit) (3:19)
5. "MTV Partyzone Megamix" (4:55)

== Charts ==
=== Weekly charts ===
Chart (1996)	Peak position
Australia (ARIA)	137
Austria (Ö3 Austria Top 40)	24
Belgium (Ultratop 50 Flanders)	12
Belgium (Ultratop 50 Wallonia)	19
Canada Dance/Urban (RPM)	22
Europe (MTV European Top 20)	13
Europe (Eurochart Hot 100)	29
Europe (European Dance Radio)	25
Germany (GfK)	39
Netherlands (Dutch Top 40)	7
Netherlands (Single Top 100)	8
Spain (AFYVE)	4
Sweden (Sverigetopplistan)	32

=== Year-end charts ===
Chart (1996)	Position
Belgium (Ultratop Flanders)	60
Belgium (Ultratop Wallonia)	99
Netherlands (Dutch Top 40)	99
Netherlands (Single Top 100)	88
