= Maximum Overdrive (song) =

1993 single by 2 Unlimited

- Artwork for continental European and Australian releases

Single by 2 Unlimited

from the album No Limits!
- Released: 8 November 1993
- Genre: Eurodance; techno-pop"
- Length: 3:58; 3:43 (single remix)
- Label: Byte
- Songwriters: Phil Wilde; Filip Martens; Ray Slijngaard; Anita Dels
- Producers: Phil Wilde; Jean-Paul De Coster

2 Unlimited singles chronology
"Faces" (1993)	"Maximum Overdrive" (1993)	"Let the Beat Control Your Body" (1994)

Music video
- "Maximum Overdrive" on YouTube

"Maximum Overdrive" is a song by Belgian-Dutch Eurodance band 2 Unlimited, released in November 1993 as the fourth single from their second album, No Limits! (1993). The song was written by band members Ray Slijngaard and Anita Dels with Phil Wilde and Filip Martens, while Wilde produced it with Jean-Paul De Coster. The UK release was the first UK single to maintain all the rap lyrics from Ray used in the European release. "Maximum Overdrive" reached number 15 on the UK Singles Chart, and was also a number-one hit in Finland and on the European Dance Radio Chart. Its accompanying music video was directed by David Betteridge and filmed in London.

== Critical reception ==
In his weekly UK chart commentary, James Masterton stated, "In as much as it is possible to classify things like this, 2 Unlimited are the most successful dance act ever." In Pan-European magazine Music & Media's review of No Limits!, they viewed the song as a "potential single", "with a racing car breaking all speed limits." Alan Jones from Music Week commented, "He raps, she sings, the music ponds in typical pop/rave style...yes, the usual 2 Unlimited hallmarks are present and correct, though melodically this is perhaps the weakest single they've released yet. Even so, this will probably scrape into the Top 10." James Hamilton from the Record Mirror Dance Update described it as "typical rapped and chanted revving techno-pop" in his weekly dance column. Alex Kadis from Smash Hits gave the song a score of three out of five, writing that "it all hangs together in such a pleasant, catchy way that you're spirited to the record shop in a most unhesitant manner."

== Chart performance ==
"Maximum Overdrive" topped the Finnish Singles Chart for three weeks It peaked at number two in Portugal and Spain, as well as number four in Belgium and number five in the Netherlands. In Portugal, it was held from reaching the top spot by "Condemnation" by Depeche Mode. It was also a top-20 hit in Austria, Denmark, Germany, Ireland, Sweden and the United Kingdom. In the latter country, it peaked at number 15 during its second week one the UK Singles Chart, on 21 November 1993, and at number 13 on the Music Week Dance Singles chart. "Maximum Overdrive" entered the Eurochart Hot 100 at number 19 on 28 November 1993 (with sales from Belgium, Ireland, the Netherlands and the UK) and peaked three weeks later at number seven. Outside Europe, it became a top-five hit in Israel, peaking at number three in its second week on the chart, on 23 November. In Oceania, the song peaked at number 32 on the ARIA Top 50 singles chart in Australia.

== Airplay ==
"Maximum Overdrive" topped the European Dance Radio Chart, becoming the most-played dance song on European radio in the week of 29 January 1994. It also entered the European airplay chart Border Breakers at number 19 on 14 November 1993 following crossover airplay in North West-Europe. It peaked at number five on 18 December. On the UK Airplay chart, the single reached number 15.

== Music video ==
The music video for "Maximum Overdrive", directed by British director David Betteridge and produced by A&R Filmstudios in London. The concept of the video is a Wacky Races style chase with rivals on skateboards and pogo sticks. It was filmed in a warehouse in Northern London in the fall of 1993 and released on 8 November. The video received heavy rotation on MTV Europe and was A-listed on Germany's VIVA.

== Track listings ==
- UK 7-inch single
1. "Maximum Overdrive" (Radio edit without intro) – 3:21
2. "Maximum Overdrive" (X-Out In-Trance) – 4:53
- Belgian 12-inch maxi
1. "Maximum Overdrive" (extended) – 5:18
2. "Maximum Overdrive" (album version) – 3:58
3. "Maximum Overdrive" (Speedaumatic remix) – 5:45
4. "Maximum Overdrive" (X-Out In Trance) – 4:53
- UK CD single
1. "Maximum Overdrive" (radio edit without intro) – 3:28
2. "Maximum Overdrive" (extended) – 5:20
3. "Maximum Overdrive" (Speedaumatic remix) – 5:45
4. "Maximum Overdrive" (X-Out In-Trance) – 4:51
- Australian CD maxi
1. "Maximum Overdrive" (radio edit) – 3:43
2. "Maximum Overdrive" (extended) – 5:18
3. "Maximum Overdrive" (Speedaumatic remix) – 5:46
4. "Maximum Overdrive" (X-Out In Trance) – 4:55
- Netherlands CD maxi
1. "Maximum Overdrive" (radio edit) – 3:43
2. "Maximum Overdrive" (extended) – 5:18
3. "Maximum Overdrive" (album version) – 3:58
4. "Maximum Overdrive" (Speedaumatic remix) – 5:45
5. "Maximum Overdrive" (X-Out In Trance) – 4:53

== Charts ==
=== Weekly charts ===
Chart (1993)	Peak position
Australia (ARIA)	32
Austria (Ö3 Austria Top 40)	13
Belgium (Ultratop 50 Flanders)	4
Denmark (IFPI)	14
Europe (Eurochart Hot 100)	7
Europe (European Dance Radio)	1
Finland (Suomen virallinen lista)	1
France (SNEP)	35
Germany (Media Control Charts)	16
Ireland (IRMA)	11
Israel (Israeli Singles Chart)	3
Lithuania (M-1)	10
Netherlands (Dutch Top 40)	5
Netherlands (Single Top 100)	6
Portugal (AFP)	2
Spain (AFYVE)	2
Sweden (Sverigetopplistan)	18
Switzerland (Schweizer Hitparade)	23
UK Singles (OCC)	15
UK Airplay (Music Week)	15
UK Dance (Music Week)	13
UK Club Chart (Music Week)	55

=== Year-end charts ===
Chart (1993)	Position
Netherlands (Dutch Top 40)	85
Sweden (Topplistan)	72

Chart (1994)	Position
Belgium (Ultratop 50 Flanders)	98
Europe (Eurochart Hot 100)	78
Europe (European Dance Radio)	15

== Release history ==
Region	Date	Format(s)	Label(s)	Ref.
United Kingdom	8 November 1993	7-inch vinyl; 12-inch vinyl; CD; cassette	PWL Continental	
Australia	13 December 1993	CD; cassette	Liberation; Byte	
