= Faces (2 Unlimited song) =

1993 single by 2 Unlimited

- Widely distributed variant of the standard artwork

Single by 2 Unlimited

from the album No Limits!
- Released: 23 August 1993
- Genre: Eurodance; techno
- Length: 3:48; 3:30 (single remix)
- Label: Byte
- Songwriters: Phil Wilde; Jean-Paul De Coster; Ray Slijngaard; Anita Dels
- Producers: Phil Wilde; Jean-Paul De Coster

2 Unlimited singles chronology
"Tribal Dance" (1993)	"Faces" (1993)	"Maximum Overdrive" (1993)

Music video
- "Faces" on YouTube

"Faces" is a song by Belgian/Dutch Eurodance band 2 Unlimited, released on 23 August 1993 as the third single from their second album, No Limits! (1993). The song was co-written by band members Ray Slijngaard and Anita Dels, with Phil Wilde and Jean-Paul De Coster who produced it. "Faces" peaked at number two in the Netherlands, number eight in the United Kingdom and at number six on the Eurochart Hot 100. The accompanying music video was directed by Nick Burgess-Jones and filmed in London, depicting Ray and Anita in a futuristic desert landscape.

== Release ==
The single version of "Faces" is a radio edit of the album version included on the No Limits! album internationally. "Faces (Radio Edit)" substitutes the less-palatable, harsh synth lead with a milder rendition of the same riff. In the United States, this radio edit of "Faces" was included on the No Limits! album instead of the album version found on all international pressings. In the UK, the radio edit of "Faces" omitted the main rap, but like their previous single "Tribal Dance", the song left in more vocals from band member Ray Slijngaard. The UK album version instead deletes Slijngaard's vocals during the main raps, but kept his spoken vocals during the break.

== Critical reception ==
In his weekly UK chart commentary, James Masterton wrote, "This new single if anything contains more depth than their average work, with changes of tempo rife throughout." Alan Jones from Music Week felt it was "a more complex than usual offering from the Dutch duo who eschew their simple and highly effective straight-ahead rave style in favour of a tempo-changing and less instant song." He added, "They'll pay the price at retail with one of their smaller hits to date, though the Top 20 is still a cert." Gail Heritage from Port Lincoln Times named it a "favourite" of the album, remarking that it "opens the door to recognising people for their own individuality." James Hamilton from the Record Mirror Dance Update described it as a "techno synth buzzed but unrushed tinkling blippy sweet loper" in his weekly dance column. Toby Anstis reviewed the song for Smash Hits, stating that "this is just a taster of what the album sounds like". He added that "it'll be a hit". Australian Woroni named "Faces" an "obvious highlight" of the No Limits! album, along with "No Limit" and "Tribal Dance".

== Chart performance ==
"Faces" peaked at number two in the Netherlands, number three in Belgium, number four in Spain, and number five in Finland. In the band's native Netherlands, the song debuted at number 40 on the Dutch Single Top 100, before peaking five weeks later, spending 12 weeks within the chart. It was kept off the top spot by "What's Up" by 4 Non Blondes. "Faces" also entered the top 10 in Austria, Germany, Ireland, Lithuania, and the United Kingdom. In Germany, it spent a total of 19 weeks within the German Singles Chart, with four weeks inside the top 10.

In the United Kingdom, it peaked at number eight in its second week on the UK Singles Chart on 5 September 1993. The single spent two weeks at that position and seven weeks within the UK Top 100. It also peaked at numbers six and 28 on Music Week's Dance Singles and Airplay charts, as well as number 30 on the Record Mirror Club Chart in the same period. "Faces" was a top-10 hit also on the Eurochart Hot 100, where it peaked at number six on 25 September, after debuting on the chart at number 20 three weeks earlier. On the European Dance Radio Chart, it reached number two, behind "Dreamlover" by Mariah Carey, becoming the second most-played dance song on European radio in the week of 16 October 1993. In France, Italy and Sweden, the song was a top-20 hit, peaking at numbers 16, 13 and 11, respectively. Outside Europe, "Faces" charted in Australia, reaching number 54 on the ARIA Singles Chart. In West Asia, it became successful in Israel, both debuting and peaking at number two on the chart, on 13 July 1993. It spent three weeks at that position.

== Music video ==
The music video for "Faces" was directed by British director Nick Burgess-Jones and produced by Spidercom Films. It was filmed in Park Royal film studio in London. The backdrop of the video depicts a futuristic desert landscape where band members Ray Slijngaard and Anita Dels are surrounded by machines and screens, where different faces are shown. Sometimes the duo is seen in black-and-white, with the surroundings still in colours. "Faces" received heavy rotation on MTV Europe in September 1993. There were made two different edits of the video; the rap version and the no rap version. The rap version of "Faces" was later made available on 2 Unlimited's official YouTube channel in 2014, having generated more than 4 million views on the platform as of early 2025.

== Track listing ==
- 7-inch single
1. "Faces" (Radio Edit) (3:37)
2. "Faces" (Album Version) (3:49)
- Belgian 12-inch maxi
1. "Faces" (Radio Edit) (3:47)
2. "Faces" (Extended) (5:55)
3. "Faces" (X-Out Remix) (5:17)
4. "Faces" (Trance-Aumatic Remix) (5:20)
5. "Faces" (Automatic Breakbeat Remix) (5:30)
- Netherlands 12-inch maxi
1. "Faces" (Extended) (5:55)
2. "Faces" (X-Out Remix) (5:17)
3. "Faces" (Trance-Aumatic Remix) (5:20)
4. "Faces" (Automatic Breakbeat Remix) (5:30)
- UK 12-inch maxi
1. "Faces" (Extended) (5:55)
2. "Faces" (X-Out Remix) (6:17)
3. "Faces" (Trance-Aumatic Remix) (5:20)
4. "Faces" (Automatic Breakbeat Remix) (5:30)
5. "Faces" (Original Version) (4:43)
- US 12-inch maxi
1. "Faces" (Extended Mix) (5:55)
2. "Faces" (X-Out Remix) (5:17)
3. "Faces" (Radio Edit) (3:37)
4. "Faces" (Trance-Automatic Remix) (5:20)
5. "Faces" (Automatic Breakbeat Remix) (5:30)
6. "Faces" (Spanish Radio Version) (3:37)
- UK CD single
1. "Faces" (Edit) (3:34)
2. "Faces" (Extended) (5:57)
3. "Faces" (X-Out Remix) (5:18)
4. "Faces" (Trance-Aumatic Remix) (5:22)
5. "Faces" (Automatic Breakbeat Remix) (5:32)
6. "Faces" (Original Version) (3:47)
- European CD maxi
1. "Faces" (Radio Edit) (3:37)
2. "Faces" (Extended) (5:55)
3. "Faces" (X-Out Remix) (5:17)
4. "Faces" (Trance-Aumatic Remix) (5:20)
5. "Faces" (Automatic Breakbeat Remix) (5:30)

== Charts ==
=== Weekly charts ===
Chart (1993)	Peak position
Australia (ARIA)	54
Austria (Ö3 Austria Top 40)	10
Belgium (Ultratop 50 Flanders)	3
Europe (Eurochart Hot 100)	6
Europe (European Dance Radio)	2
Europe (European Hit Radio)	31
Finland (Suomen virallinen lista)	5
France (SNEP)	16
Germany (GfK)	8
Greece (Pop + Rock)	11
Ireland (IRMA)	7
Israel (Israeli Singles Chart)	2
Italy (Musica e dischi)	13
Lithuania (M-1)	5
Netherlands (Dutch Top 40)	2
Netherlands (Single Top 100)	2
Spain (AFYVE)	4
Sweden (Sverigetopplistan)	11
Switzerland (Schweizer Hitparade)	19
UK Singles (Official Charts)	8
UK Airplay (Music Week)	28
UK Dance (Music Week)	6
UK Club Chart (Music Week)	30

=== Year-end charts ===
Chart (1993)	Position
Belgium (Ultratop)	23
Europe (Eurochart Hot 100)	63
Europe (European Dance Radio)	14
Germany (Media Control)	51
Netherlands (Dutch Top 40)	35
Netherlands (Single Top 100)	46
Sweden (Topplistan)	82

== Release history ==
Region	Date	Format(s)	Label(s)	Ref.
Australia	23 August 1993	CD; cassette	Liberation	
United Kingdom	23 August 1993	7-inch vinyl; cassette	PWL Continental; Byte	
Australia	13 September 1993	12-inch vinyl	Liberation	
Japan	26 September 1993	Mini-CD	Mercury	
