= The Magic Friend =

1992 single by 2 Unlimited

- Widely distributed variant of the standard artwork

Single by 2 Unlimited

from the album Get Ready!
- Released: 3 August 1992
- Genre: Eurodance; techno
- Length: 4:32; 3:43 (single version)
- Label: Byte
- Songwriters: P. Neefs; Ray Slijngaard
- Producers: Phil Wilde; Jean-Paul De Coster

2 Unlimited singles chronology
"Workaholic" (1992)	"The Magic Friend" (1992)	"No Limit" (1993)

Music video
- "The Magic Friend" on YouTube

"The Magic Friend" is a song by Belgian/Dutch Eurodance band 2 Unlimited. It was released in August 1992 as the fourth and final single from their debut album, Get Ready! (1992). The UK release once again omitted Ray Slijngaard's rap, which lasted for 16 bars three times through, but did include some of the vocals from Anita Doth, with the "mocking chorus echoes" being abandoned as only Ray's part remains, thus leaving Anita's sole vocals as "disembodied whispers" during the middle eight. The single experienced chart success in many European countries, including Finland, where it topped the chart. Its accompanying music video was directed by David Betteridge and filmed in Australia. The Dutch leading afternoon radio program on national pop outlet Radio 3 FM/Hilversum renamed itself "The Magic Friend", after the single.

== Critical reception ==
Larry Flick from Billboard magazine wrote, "One of the more successful techno acts in Europe continues its bid for mainstream club and radio approval along these shores with a cute and NRGetic wriggler. The music is a bit harder than previous tracks, though the rap is a little too strained and silly for its own good." Kat Stevens of Freaky Trigger noted the track's "tasty ingredients" of "recogniseable pop stars, colourful boshing beats, catchy chorus, silly noises [and] fervoured anticipation." Comparing parts of the track to settings on a Yamaha keyboard, she compared the track's main synth sound to the "Brass 1" setting and the "gutteral metallic swinging" to the "Slap Bass" setting. James Hamilton from Music Week's RM Dance Update deemed it as "'Start-Rite' techno for young "wannabe" ravers". Tom Doyle from Smash Hits stated that "the insufferable duo return with another ropey techno effort".

== Chart performance ==
"The Magic Friend" peaked at number one in Finland and entered top 10 in Belgium, Ireland, the Netherlands, and Spain. In the United Kingdom, the single reached number 11 during its third week at the UK Singles Chart, on 23 August 1992. On the UK Dance Singles chart in Music Week, "The Magic Friend" reached number nine. Additionally, it was a top-20 hit in Germany and a top-30 hit in Sweden. On the Eurochart Hot 100, it peaked at number 11. Outside Europe, the single reached number one on the Canadian RPM Dance chart and number 26 on the RPM 100 Hit Tracks chart, number three in Israel, number five in Zimbabwe, and number 16 in Australia.

== Music video ==
The music video for "The Magic Friend" was directed by British director David Betteridge. It was shot in The Pinnacles and Wave Rock in Australia. Ray and Anita sing the song in the video while a mysterious character dances around in the background. Selina Webb from Music Week complimented "the slightly surreal" video, adding that it is "in particular standing head and shoulders above the average dance video." Betteridge also directed the videos for "Get Ready for This", "Twilight Zone" and "Workaholic". "The Magic Friend" was later made available on 2 Unlimited's official YouTube channel in 2014.

== Track listings ==
- 7-inch single
1. "The Magic Friend" (vocal edit) (3:43)
2. "The Magic Friend" (instrumental edit) (3:02)
- 12-inch maxi
1. "The Magic Friend" (Automatic remix) (4:23)
2. "The Magic Friend" (Rio & Le Jean mix) (5:15)
3. "Automatic Megamix" (4:55)
4. "Murphy's Megamix" (5:40)
- CD single, Belgium
1. "The Magic Friend" (vocal edit) (3:43)
2. "The Magic Friend" (instrumental edit) (3:02)
3. "The Magic Friend" (extended version) (5:14)
4. "The Magic Friend" (Rio & Le Jean remix) (5:15)
5. "The Magic Friend" (Automatic remix) (4:23)
6. "Murphy's Megamix" (5:40)
7. "Automatic Megamix" (4:55)
- CD single, UK
1. "The Magic Friend" (7-inch edit) (3:02)
2. "The Magic Friend" (Automatic remix) (4:23)
3. "The Magic Friend" (Rio & Le Jean remix) (5:15)
4. "Automatic Megamix" (4:55)
- CD maxi, Germany
1. "The Magic Friend" (vocal edit) (3:43)
2. "The Magic Friend" (instrumental edit) (3:02)
3. "The Magic Friend" (extended) (5:14)
4. "The Magic Friend" (Rio & Le Jean remix) (5:05)
5. "Murphy's Megamix" (5:40)
6. "Automatic Megamix" (4:55)

== Charts ==
=== Weekly charts ===
Chart (1992)	Peak position
Australia (ARIA)	16
Austria (Ö3 Austria Top 40)	26
Belgium (Ultratop 50 Flanders)	4
Canada Dance/Urban (RPM)	1
Europe (Eurochart Hot 100)	11
Finland (Suomen virallinen lista)	1
Germany (GfK)	17
Ireland (IRMA)	3
Israel (Israeli Singles Chart)	3
Netherlands (Dutch Top 40)	5
Netherlands (Single Top 100)	3
Spain (AFYVE)	9
Sweden (Sverigetopplistan)	27
UK Singles (Official Charts)	11
UK Airplay (Music Week)	37
UK Dance (Music Week)	9
Zimbabwe (ZIMA)	5

=== Year-end charts ===
Chart (1992)	Position
Australia (ARIA)	94
Belgium (Ultratop 50 Flanders)	41
Canada Dance/Urban (RPM)	13
Europe (Eurochart Hot 100)	81
Germany (Media Control)	93
Israel (Israeli Singles Chart)	50
Netherlands (Dutch Top 40)	49
Netherlands (Single Top 100)	40

== Release history ==
Region	Date	Format(s)	Label(s)	Ref.
United Kingdom	3 August 1992	7-inch vinyl; 12-inch vinyl; CD; cassette	PWL Continental	
Australia	5 October 1992	12-inch vinyl; CD; cassette	Liberation	
Japan	16 November 1992	Mini-CD	Mercury	
