= Workaholic (song) =

1992 single by 2 Unlimited

- Standard artwork

Single by 2 Unlimited

from the album Get Ready!
- Released: 20 April 1992
- Genre: Techno
- Length: 4:10; 3:38
- Label: Byte
- Songwriters: Phil Wilde; Jean-Paul De Coster; Lieve De Cock; Ray Slijngaard
- Producers: Phil Wilde; Jean-Paul De Coster

2 Unlimited singles chronology
"Twilight Zone" (1992)	"Workaholic" (1992)	"The Magic Friend" (1992)

Music video
- "Workaholic" on YouTube

"Workaholic" is a song by Belgian/Dutch Eurodance band 2 Unlimited, released in April 1992 by Byte Records as the third single from their debut album, Get Ready!. The song features a chorus from Anita Doth and, outside the UK, verses from Ray Slijngaard. He co-wrote it with producers Phil Wilde and Jean-Paul De Coster, and Lieve De Cock. The single experienced chart success in several countries, reaching the top five in Finland, Ireland, Israel, the Netherlands, Norway and the United Kingdom. In Zimbabwe, it reached number one in August 1992. David Betteridge directed the accompanying music video.

== Content ==
The opening segment of the song features bells ringing in descending followed by ascending order (replicating the Westminster chime effect). This segment is played at Yankee Stadium in New York City whenever baseball's New York Yankees score a run and at multiple NHL arenas, such as the Crypto.com Arena's Los Angeles Kings and the Canadian Tire Centre’s Ottawa Senators when a penalty is called against the visiting team. It is also used when the Los Angeles Lakers score a 3 Point Basket. It also is used by the South Atlantic League’s Hudson Valley Renegades whenever a Renegades player scores at Heritage Financial Park.

Controversially, on the album version of the song, there is a quote: "Who the fuck are you?" at the beginning of the track. However, in the radio edit and the music video, the entire quote is omitted. A version also included in the album, labelled as an "instrumental" version (although it retains all of Ray and Anita's vocals) removes the quote and surrounding lines, moving the first "The workaholic" to before the bell intro. The opening phrase in the song, "Ok, let's go to work" comes from the 1987 film Wall Street.

== Critical reception ==
Bevan Hannah from The Canberra Times described the song as a "faster version" of "Get Ready for This". Andy Kastanas from The Charlotte Observer wrote, "These guys make a strong showing, following up their No. 1 single 'Twilight Zone' with another monstrous rave song." Irish Evening Herald stated, "Expect 2 Unlimited's next single 'Workaholic', to be massive". James Hamilton from Music Week's RM Dance Update named it a "galloping commercial raver", like "an updated Boney M for the Nineties". Johnny Dee from Smash Hits gave the track a score of four out of five, stating that it is a "zippy, loopy, stormtrooper overdrive that is guaranteed to cause twisted ankles and sislocated shoulders should you decide on a spot of aerobicising during its lightning fast four minutes."

== Chart performance ==
"Workaholic" reached its highest peaks in Finland and Ireland, at number two. In the UK, it peaked at number four during its third week on the UK Singles Chart, on 10 May 1992. Additionally, it was a top-10 hit in Belgium, the Netherlands, Norway and Spain while reaching the top 30 in Sweden and the top 40 in Switzerland. On the Eurochart Hot 100, "Workaholic" reached number 14. Outside Europe, it was a number-one hit in Zimbabwe in August 1992, peaked at number three in Israel, number six on the Canadian RPM Dance chart, and reached number 26 on the US Billboard Dance Club Play chart. In Australia, the single reached number 35 on the ARIA Singles Chart.

== Music video ==
The music video for "Workaholic" was directed by British director David Betteridge. It features band members Ray Slijngaard and Anita Doth performing in front of a purple backdrop. They both wear the official 2 Unlimited-logo on their outfits. In between several people appears, either busy working at an office or with housework at home. Sometimes Anita lays or sits inside a Ball Chair, or Ray plays on a keyboard. He also has his signature hair fade-cut with the band's logo on the right side of his head. Betteridge had previously directed the videos for "Get Ready for This" (1991) and "Twilight Zone" (1992).

== Track listings ==
- 7-inch single
1. "Workaholic" (vocal edit) — 3:34
2. "Workaholic" (instrumental edit) — 3:34
- 12-inch maxi
1. "Workaholic" (extended mix)
2. "Workaholic" (Rio & Le Jean mix)
3. "Get Ready for This" (Rio & Le Jean '92 remix)
- CD single, Germany
1. "Workaholic" (7-inch vocal edit) — 3:34
2. "Workaholic" (Extended mix) — 5:51
3. "Workaholic" (Rio & Le Jean remix) — 5:07
4. "Workaholic" (Hardcore remix) — 4:15
- CD single, Netherlands
1. "Workaholic" (extended mix) — 5:51
2. "Workaholic" (Rio & Le Jean remix) — 5:07
3. "Workaholic" (Hardcore remix) — 4:15
4. "Workaholic" (vocal edit) — 3:34
5. "Get Ready for This" (Rio & Le Jean remix '92) — 4:11
- CD single, UK
1. "Workaholic" (7-inch mix) — 3:07
2. "Workaholic" (extended mix) — 5:22
3. "Get Ready for This" (Rio & Le Jean remix '92) — 4:10
- CD maxi, Benelux
1. "Workaholic" (extended mix) — 5:51
2. "Workaholic" (Rio & Le Jean remix) — 5:07
3. "Workaholic" (Hardcore remix) — 4:15
4. "Workaholic" (vocal edit) — 3:34
5. "Get Ready For This" (Rio & Le Jean remix '92) — 4:11

== Charts ==
=== Weekly charts ===
Chart (1992)	Peak position
Australia (ARIA)	35
Belgium (Ultratop 50 Flanders)	8
Canada Dance/Urban (RPM)	6
Europe (Eurochart Hot 100)	14
Finland (Suomen virallinen lista)	2
Ireland (IRMA)	2
Israel (Israeli Singles Chart)	3
Netherlands (Dutch Top 40)	6
Netherlands (Single Top 100)	4
Norway (VG-lista)	5
Spain (AFYVE)	6
Sweden (Sverigetopplistan)	24
Switzerland (Schweizer Hitparade)	37
UK Singles (Official Charts)	4
UK Airplay (Music Week)	29
UK Dance (Music Week)	25
UK Club Chart (Music Week)	80
US Dance Club Play (Billboard)	26
Zimbabwe (ZIMA)	1

=== Year-end charts ===
Chart (1992)	Position
Belgium (Ultratop)	50
Netherlands (Dutch Top 40)	52
Netherlands (Single Top 100)	41
UK Singles (OCC)	99

== Release history ==
Region	Date	Format(s)	Label(s)	Ref.
Germany	20 April 1992	CD	ZYX Music	
Netherlands	20 April 1992	7-inch vinyl; CD	Byte	
Australia	22 June 1992	12-inch vinyl; CD; cassette	Liberation; Byte	
